= List of environmental engineers =

Environmental engineers conduct hazardous-waste management studies to evaluate the significance of such hazards, advise on treatment and containment, and develop regulations to prevent mishaps. Environmental engineers also design municipal water supply and industrial wastewater treatment systems as well as address local and worldwide environmental issues such as the effects of acid rain, global warming, ozone depletion, water pollution and air pollution from automobile exhausts and industrial sources.

== A ==
- Linda Abriola
- Vincent Adams
- G. D. Agrawal
- Rodney John Allam
- Braden Allenby
- Takashi Asano

== B ==
- Michelle L. Bell
- Sarah Bell
- Diana Bendz
- Craig H. Benson
- Jacobo Bielak
- Gonzalo Blumel
- Tami Bond
- Andrew Braddock
- Tega Brain
- John Leck Bruce
- Anne Butler

== C ==
- Ann Marie Carlton
- Ferhan Çeçen
- Irina Chakraborty
- Kartik Chandran
- Chen Jining
- Ashraf Choudhary
- Reymond Clark
- Margarita Colmenares
- Robert Costanza

== D ==
- Enrico Dalgas

== E ==
- Peter S. Eagleson
- Marc Edwards
- Menachem Elimelech
- Isabel Escobar

== F ==
- Mehreen Faruqi
- Therese Flapper
- Efi Foufoula-Georgiou

== G ==
- Germán García Durán
- Robert A. Gearheart
- Debjani Ghosh
- Earnest F. Gloyna

== H ==
- Jim Hall
- Han Jeoung-ae
- Hao Jiming
- Chris Hendrickson
- Michael R. Hoffmann

== I ==
- Jörg Imberger

== J ==
- Mark Z. Jacobson
- Jenna Jambeck
- Alfred Stowell Jones
- Sven Erik Jørgensen

== L ==
- Douglas A. Lawson
- Cornelis Lely
- Swietenia Puspa Lestari
- Bruce E. Logan
- Nancy G. Love
- Joseph Lstiburek

== M ==
- Donald Mackay
- Perry McCarty
- Ross E. McKinney
- Ramesh Sumant Mehta
- Richard O. Mines Jr.
- Dade Moeller
- Nicolas Moussiopoulos
- Catherine Mulligan
- Cornelius B. Murphy Jr.

== N ==
- Deb Niemeier

== O ==
- Daniel Oerther
- William J. Oswald

== P ==
- James F. Pankow
- Ralph Patt
- Sarah Peters
- George Pinder
- Mia Krisna Pratiwi

== R ==
- Lutgarde Raskin
- Charlene Ren
- Ellen Swallow Richards
- Bruce Rittmann
- Donald Van Norman Roberts
- Paul V. Roberts

== S ==
- David Sedlak
- John Richard Sheaffer
- Anne C. Steinemann
- Suthan Suthersan

== T ==
- Valerie M. Thomas
- Kennie Tsui
- Mustafa Tuna

== V ==
- Daniel A. Vallero
- Marcos Von Sperling

== W ==
- Gary White
- Abel Wolman
- Eric Franklin Wood

== Z ==
- Linda Zou
