= Ramsar Wetland Conservation Award =

- Description: Promoting the wise use and conservation of wetlands
- Country: International
- Presented by: Ramsar Convention Secretariat
- Reward: Evian Special Prize ($10,000)

The Ramsar Wetland Conservation Award honours the work of governments, organisations and individuals in promoting the wise use and conservation of wetlands.

The Ramsar Wetland Conservation Award was established in 1996 at the 6th meeting of the contracting parties to the Ramsar Convention. The award has been given six times so far on the occasion of meetings of the Conference of the Contracting Parties (1999, 2002, 2005, 2008, 2012, and 2015). All awardees have also received the Evian Special Prize of US$10,000, donated by Danone.

== Awards ==
=== 2015 ===
- The Ramsar Convention Award for Wetland Wise Use: Ms Giselle Hazzan, manager, Ein Afek Nature Reserve, Israel
- The Ramsar Convention Award for Wetland Innovation: Oceanium, Dakar, Senegal
- The Ramsar Convention Award for Young Wetlands Champions: Fundación Humedales Bogotá
- The Ramsar Convention Award for Merit: shared by Professor William Mitsch (director, Everglades Wetland Research Park, US), Professor Gea Jae Joo (Pusan University, Republic of Korea) and Tour du Valat, France

=== 2012 ===
- Management category: Ms Augusta Henriques, secretary general, Tiniguena (Guinea-Bissau)
- Science category: Professor Tatsuichi Tsujii (Japan)
- Education category: The Wisconsin Wetlands Association (US)
- Recognition of Excellence: Thymio Papayannis, Greece
- 40th Anniversary Honorary Ramsar Award: Dr Luc Hoffmann, Switzerland

=== 2008 ===
- Science category: David Pritchard (multiregional), for supporting the development and implementation of the Ramsar Convention for two decades as a representative of BirdLife International
- Management category: Denis Landenbergue (multiregional), for outstanding achievements regarding the designation of Ramsar sites and other protected areas, with improved management, especially in Asia, Central and South America, and Africa
- Education category: Dr Sansanee Choowaew (Thailand), for her exceptional contributions to wetland management, education, training and capacity building, in Thailand and elsewhere in Asia
- Recognition of Excellence: Dr Jan Květ (Czech Republic), for his lifetime work and support for wetland science and conservation

=== 2005 ===
- Management category: Dr Sh. A. Nezami Baloochi (Iran), for his pivotal role in the establishment of a conservation and wise use scheme for the Anzali Lagoon site
- Science category: Professor Shuming Cai (China), for his research on the Yangtze River, including the effects of the Three Gorges Dam project on the environment
- Education category: shared by:
  - Ms Reiko Nakamura (Japan), for promoting wetland conservation as an environmental journalist, and creating the Ramsar Centre Japan in 1990
  - The Wetlands Centre (Australia), for its pioneering role in the restoration and management of the Hunter Estuary wetlands site, and for forging links with other centres in Australia

=== 2002 ===
- Banrock Station Wines (Australia), for its innovative approach and imaginative rehabilitation and management practices at the Banrock Station Wetlands site
- Chilika Development Authority (India), for its outstanding achievement in restoring the Chilika Lake site
- NGO Trinational Initiative for the Morava-Dyje Floodplain (Austria, Czech Republic and Slovak Republic), in recognition of work carried out in three countries to ensure the conservation and sustainable use of the cultural and natural heritage of the floodplains of the Morava and Dyje rivers
- Recognition of Excellence: Dr Monique Coulet (France), for her scientific research and commitment to making practical use of knowledge acquired in the field
- Recognition of Excellence: Dr Max Finlayson (Australia), for contributions to both the progress of wetland science and the work of the Ramsar Convention, with particular regard to leadership of the Scientific and Technical Review Panel

=== 1999 ===
- Individual category: shared by:
  - Professor Vitaly G. Krivenko (Russia), for lifetime achievement in working, in difficult circumstances, for wetland and waterbird conservation
  - Victor Pulido (Peru), recognising a life of dedication to wetland conservation and wise use against a background of social and economic challenge
- NGO category: shared by
  - Lake Naivasha Riparian Association (Kenya), a pioneering example of a local community taking the initiative and achieving long-term conservation results with regard to the Lake Naivasha site
  - Society for the Protection of Prespa (Greece), for its pioneering approach at local, national and international levels towards the sustainable management of the Lake Prespa site
- Government/Non-governmental Coalition Category: Pacific Estuary Conservation Program (Canada), for excellence in conserving and insuring long-term sustainable use of estuarine habitat along the British Columbian coast

== See also ==
- List of environmental awards
