= Nancy Love =

Nancy Love may refer to:

- Nancy Harkness Love (1914–1976), American pilot and airplane commander
- Nancy G. Love, American engineer
