= Stockholm Water Prize =

Annual prize for water-related activities

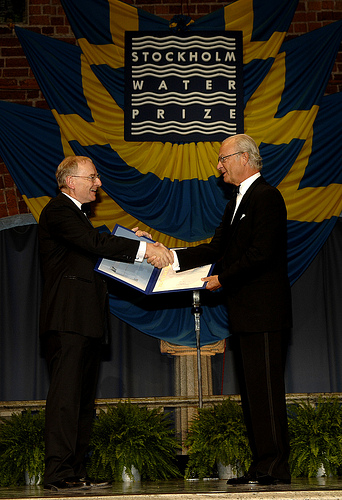
- 2012 winner IWMI
- Awarded for: Outstanding achievements in water related activities
- Country: Sweden
- Presented by: Stockholm Water Foundation
- First award: 1991
- Currently held by: Kaveh Madani (2026)
- Website: www.siwi.org

The Stockholm Water Prize is an annual award for outstanding contributions to the sustainable use and protection of the world's water resources, awarded by the Stockholm Water Foundation (SWF) in collaboration with the Royal Swedish Academy of Sciences since 1991.

== History ==
The Stockholm Water Prize was established in 1991.

In 2015, the Stockholm Water Prize adopted a new design, inspired by water.

== Description ==
The Stockholm Water Prize is the world's most prestigious water award, known as the "Nobel Prize of Water". It is presented annually to a person or organization for outstanding contributions to the sustainable use and protection of the world's water resources.

It is awarded by the Stockholm Water Foundation (SWF) in collaboration with the Royal Swedish Academy of Sciences since 1991. Any activity or actor which contributes broadly to the conservation and protection of the world's water resources, and to improved water conditions which contribute to the health and welfare of the planet's inhabitants and our ecosystems, is eligible to be nominated for the Stockholm Water Prize.

The Stockholm Water Prize Laureate is announced every year on the World Water Day in March and honoured each August during the World Water Week in Stockholm at a royal prize ceremony and banquet in the Stockholm City Hall. At the ceremony, the laureate receives the prize from H.M. King Carl XVI Gustaf of Sweden, who is the patron of the Stockholm Water Prize.

The prize, created and financed by the Stockholm Water Foundation and the Kungl. Vetenskapsakademien, includes a SEK 1000,000 award and a specially designed Orrefors crystal sculpture.

Stockholm Water Prize Laureates have come from across the world and represented a wide range of professions, disciplines, and activities in the field of water.

=== Junior Water Prize ===
The Stockholm Junior Water Prize is also administered by SIWI and awarded during the World Water Week in Stockholm each August. At the same time as the design was changed for the main prize in 2015, the design of the statuettes for the Stockholm Junior Water Prize and the Stockholm Industry Water Prize was changed to match.

== Statuette ==
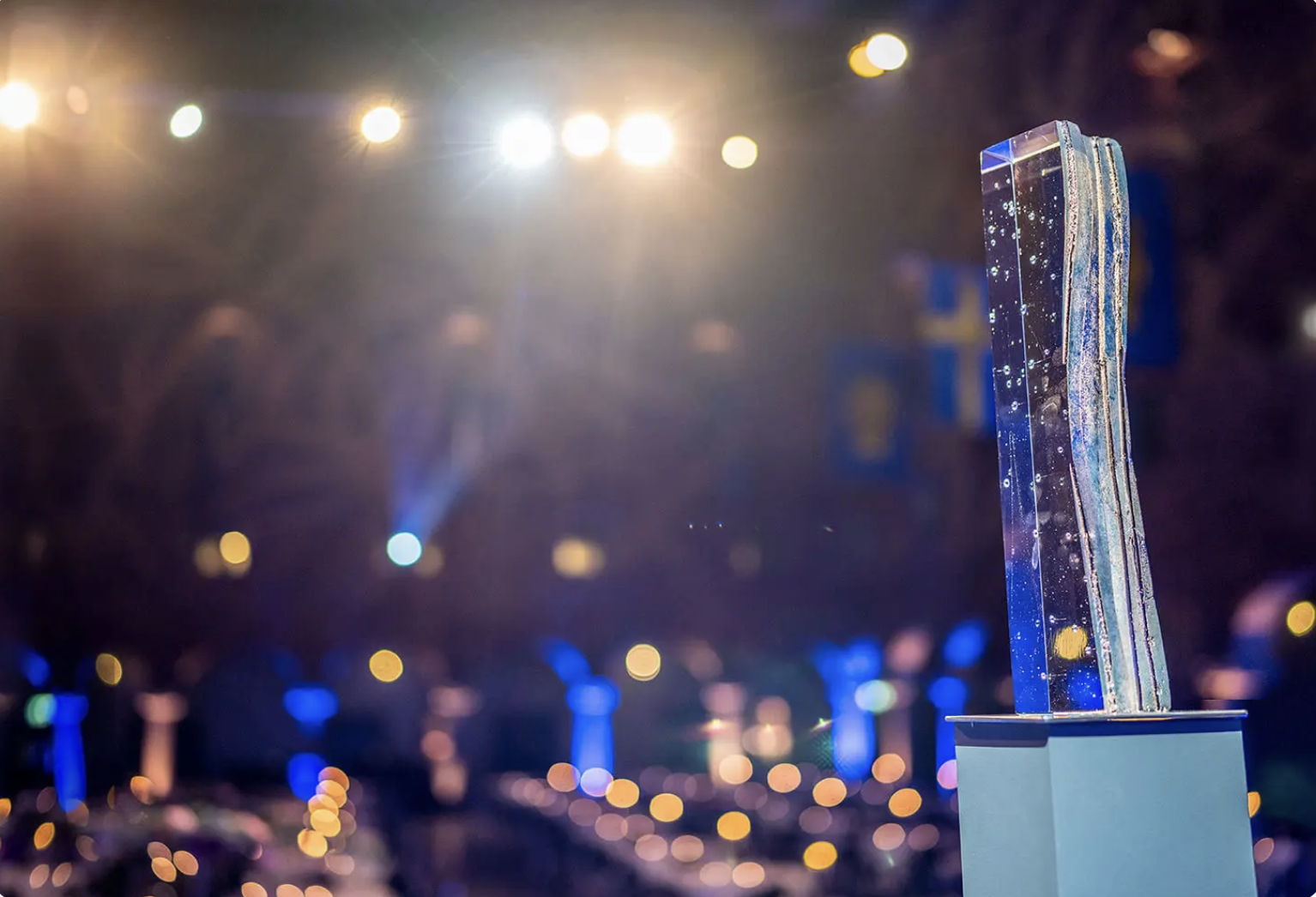
The Stockholm Water Prize statuette

The Stockholm Water Prize statuette was designed by Jonas Torstensson and Linda Röjås of Torstensson Art & Design, a Swedish design and architecture studio.

The statuettes are handmade and cast in a sand mould. The optical qualities of the glass reflect shades of blue and green, symbolizing the diversity of water. They are produced at Orrefors Glassworks in Sweden. The material is environmentally friendly crystal glass, free from lead and arsenic, with at least 30–70% of the glass coming from recycled sources. The production energy is sourced from renewable energy.

== Past winners and official motivation ==
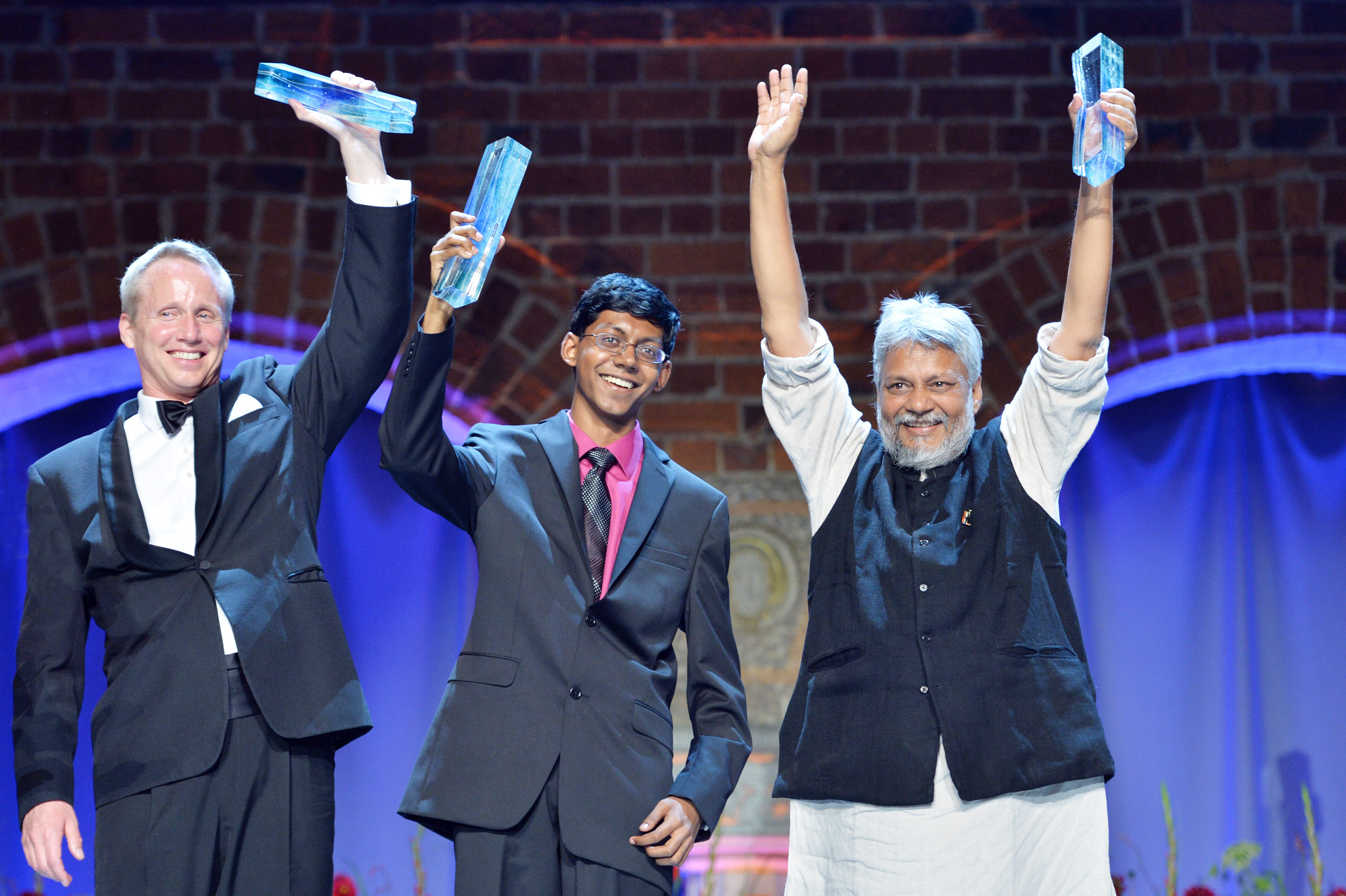
CH2M, winner of the Stockholm Water Award; Perry Alagappan of the US, winner of the Stockholm Junior Water Prize; and Rajendra Singh of India, winner of the Stockholm Water Prize, at the 2015 ceremony in Stockholm City Hall, Sweden

- 2026: Kaveh Madani (Iran) for " unique combination of groundbreaking research on water management with policy, diplomacy and global outreach, often under personal risk and political complexity"
- 2025: Günter Blöschl (Austria), for groundbreaking contributions to analyzing floods and reducing flood risks under climate change.
- 2024: Taikan Oki (Japan), for outstanding contributions to studying global water balance, mapping virtual water flows, and understanding the spatial and temporal variability of renewable water.
- 2023: Andrea Rinaldo (Italy), for groundbreaking work with a major impact on several academic fields, including hydrology, hydrogeomorphology and epidemiology. His research is used to protect biodiversity and stem the spread of disease.
- 2022: Wilfried Brutsaert (Belgium), for his groundbreaking work to quantify environmental evaporation, helping to make accurate predictions of the impact that climate change has on local rainfall patterns and water sources. Brutsaert is the world's leading authority on terrestrial evaporation. Such evaporation is a crucial aspect of the water cycle but very difficult to measure or estimate, particularly on a local level.
- 2021: Sandra Postel (US), for tireless efforts to raise awareness about the global water threats and draw attention to the impacts of humans on the water cycle.
- 2020: John Cherry (Canada), professor emeritus from the University of Waterloo in Ontario, Canada. He undertook research on the migration of contaminants in groundwater and he participated in the development of technologies for groundwater monitoring and remediation thus "revolutionizing groundwater research". His research resulted in a "paradigm shift in groundwater pollution control measures", leading to new groundwater remediation guidelines to be adopted in the United States and other countries in the 1990s.
- 2019: Jackie King (South Africa), Extraordinary Professor at the Institute for Water Studies, University of the Western Cape, South Africa, won the award for her contributions to global river management. She is internationally recognized for developing approaches to analyze costs and benefits of water resources development, especially emphasizing the need to consider environmental flows, and for her advocacy among transboundary water decision-makers at all government levels.
- 2018: Bruce Rittmann (US) and Mark van Loosdrecht (The Netherlands) won the award together for revolutionizing water and wastewater treatment. Their research has demonstrated the possibilities to remove harmful contaminants from water, cut wastewater treatment costs, reduce energy consumption, and even recover chemicals and nutrients for recycling. Mark van Loosdrecht is Professor in Environmental Biotechnology at Delft University of Technology, The Netherlands. Bruce Rittmann is Professor of Environmental Engineering and Director of the Biodesign Swette Center for Environmental Biotechnology at the Biodesign Institute, Arizona State University, US.
- 2017: Stephen McCaffrey (US), "trailblazer in international water law" won the award "for his unparalleled contribution to the evolution and progressive realization of international water law". He is a distinguished Professor of Law at the University of the Pacific, McGeorge School of Law, in Sacramento, California, US.
- 2016: Joan Rose (US), Professor at Michigan State University, US, for "The nexus of water-related microbiology, water quality and public health is rife with uncertainty – in both theory and practice. The world is blessed with few individuals who can tackle the increasing and changing challenges to clean water and health, starting from state-of-the-art science through dedicated and original research, then moving to professional dissemination, effective lobbying of the legislative arena, influencing practitioners, and raising the general awareness. Joan Rose is the leading example of this extremely rare blend of talents."
- 2015: Rajendra Singh (India), water conservationist and director of Tarun Bharat Sangh (TBS), India, for "today's water problems cannot be solved by science or technology alone. They are instead human problems of governance, policy, leadership, and social resilience. Singh's life work has been in building social capacity to solve local water problems through participatory action, empowerment of women, linking indigenous know-how with modern scientific and technical approaches and upending traditional patterns of development, resource use, and social norms."
- 2014: John Briscoe (South Africa), founder and director of university-wide Harvard Water Quality Initiative, and for 20 years with the World Bank, for "unparalleled contributions to global and local management of water - contributions covering vast thematic, geographic, and institutional environments-that have improved the lives and livelihoods of millions of people worldwide."
- 2013: Peter Morgan (Zimbabwe), director of Aquamor, a not-for-profit in Zimbabwe, for "his work to protect the health and lives of millions of people through improved sanitation and water technologies. Over the past four decades, Dr. Morgan has invented and advanced low-cost practical solutions to provide access to safe sanitation and clean water that are being used by millions of people worldwide"
- 2012: International Water Management Institute, Sri Lanka The International Water Management Institute is the foremost organisation in agricultural water management. Their work has led to new policies and investments in agriculture that have not only enabled more productive use of water, but have enhanced food security, economic development and environmental health around the world."
- 2011: Stephen R. Carpenter, United States "Professor Carpenter has shown outstanding leadership in setting the ecological research agenda, integrating it into a socio-ecological context, and in providing guidance for the management of aquatic resources".
- 2010: Rita R. Colwell, United States "Dr Rita Colwell's numerous contributions towards solving the world's water and water-related public health problems, particularly her work to prevent the spread of cholera, is of utmost global importance. Through her research on its physiology, ecology, and metabolism, Dr Colwell advanced the fields of mathematics, genetics and remote sensing technology and not only as they relate to these bacteria but to the prevention other diseases in many developing countries."
- 2009: Bindeshwar Pathak (India), founder of Sulabh International For his wide-ranging work in the sanitation field to improve public health, advance social progress, and improve human rights in India and other countries. His accomplishments span the fields of sanitation technology, social enterprise, and healthcare education for millions of people in his native country, serving as a model for NGO agencies and public health initiatives around the world.
- 2008: John Anthony Allan (UK), King's College London and the School of Oriental and African Studies For pioneering the development of key concepts in the understanding and communication of water issues and how they are linked to agriculture, climate change, economics and politics, including the virtual water concept, which measures how water is embedded in the production and trade of food and consumer products.
- 2007: Perry McCarty, Stanford University, United States For pioneering work in developing the scientific approach for the design and operation of water and wastewater systems. He has established the role of fundamental microbiology and chemistry in the design of bioreactors. Professor McCarty has defined the field of environmental biotechnology that is the basis for small-scale and large-scale pollution control and safe drinking water systems.
- 2006: Asit K. Biswas (Mexico), The Third World Center for Water Management For his outstanding and multi-faceted contributions to global water resource issues, including research, education and awareness, water management, human and international relations in both developed and developing countries.
- 2005: Centre for Science and Environment (CSE), New Delhi, India For a successful recovery of old and generation of new knowledge on water management, a community-based sustainable integrated resource management under gender equity, a courageous stand against undemocratic, top-down bureaucratic resource control, and efficient use of a free press, and an independent judiciary to meet these goals. The award was received by Sunita Narain, the Director-General of CSE, on behalf of the institute.
- 2004: Sven Erik Jørgensen (Denmark), Danish University of Pharmaceutical Sciences, Copenhagen, Denmark and William J. Mitsch (US), Olentangy River Wetland Research Park at The Ohio State University, United States For their pioneering development and global dissemination of ecological models of lakes and wetlands, widely applied as effective tools in sustainable water resource management.
- 2003: Peter A. Wilderer (Germany), Technical University of Munich For the development and demonstration of integrative approaches to water and wastewater management across the spectrum of fundamental research, applied research, technology implementation and sustainable water management.
- 2002: Ignacio Rodríguez-Iturbe (US), Princeton University, for lasting contributions to surface hydrology, where he has been in the forefront of the scientific evolution that placed hydrology in the fellowship of Earth Sciences.
- 2001: Takashi Asano (US), University of California at Davis, United States, for his outstanding contributions to efficient use of water in the domain of wastewater reclamation, recycling and reuse through theoretical developments, practical research and worldwide adaptation and promotion.
- 2000: Kader Asmal (South Africa), Ministry of Education, South Africa, for unprecedented efforts in the development of vision, legislation and practice in the field of water management in South Africa.
- 1999: Werner Stumm (Switzerland), Federal Institute of Technology in Zurich, Switzerland and James J. Morgan (US), California Institute of Technology in Pasadena, United States, for outstanding contributions to aquatic chemistry of great importance for understanding chemical reactions in the water environment which contributed to the development of techniques for treatment of wastewater and drinking water.
- 1998: Gedeon Dagan (Israel), Tel Aviv University, Israel, for having established the basis of a new field within geohydrology where contaminant spreading in the subsurface environment is determined in such a way that it accounts for heterogeneity and for biochemical processes.
- 1997: Peter S. Eagleson (US), Massachusetts Institute of Technology, United States, for his achievements in developing models for dynamic hydrology and eco-hydrology.
- 1996: Jörg Imberger (Australia), University of Western Australia, for his contributions to the understanding of mixing and transport in lakes, estuaries and coastal seas and their influence on water quality.
- 1995: Water Aid (UK), for bringing water and sanitation facilities to over three million people in the world's poorest countries. The award was collected by the charity's director, Jon Lane.
- 1994: Takeshi Kubo (Japan), Research Institute of Wastewater Management, Japan, for his bridge-building work between nations in Asia and Europe.
- 1993: Madhav Atmaram Chitale (India), International Commission on Irrigation and Drainage, India, for his achievements in the fields of water conservation and public education programs in Southeast Asia.
- 1992: Department of Environmental Engineering at the Technical University of Denmark, for research within water purification, contaminated groundwater and tools and techniques to protect it. The award was collected by Professor Poul Harremoës on behalf of the department.
- 1991: David W. Schindler (Canada), University of Alberta, Canada, for research into excess nutrification and acidification of freshwater lakes. From 1968 to 1989 Schindler directed Experimental Lakes Area using whole-lakes as natural laboratories with an integrated ecosystem approach.

== See also ==
- List of environmental awards
