= Sheafer =

Sheafer, Sheaffer, and Sheafor are variations of a surname.

People with this surname include

Sheafer

- Edward D. Sheafer Jr. (1940–2016), United States Navy officer

Sheaffer

- Danny Sheaffer (born 1961), American baseball player
- John Richard Sheaffer (born 1931), is an American innovator
- Robert Sheaffer (born 1949), American freelance writer and UFO skeptic
- Sasha Pieterse (née Sheaffer; born 1996), South African-born American actress, singer and songwriter
- Walter A. Sheaffer (1867–1946), American inventor and businessman

Sheafor

- John W. Sheafor (1852–1928), justice of the Colorado Supreme Court
- Nathan Sheafor (born 1961), American cyclist
