= Raymond Clark =

Raymond or Ray Clark may refer to:

- Ossie Clark (1942–1996), British fashion designer
- Raymond Clark (canoeist) (1924–1990), American canoer who competed in the late 1940s
- Raymond Clark (engineer), British engineer
- Raymond J. Clark III, convicted for the murder of Annie Le
- Ray R. Clark (1877–1926), American politician
- Yodelin' Slim Clark (1917–2000), American singer
- Ray Clark (baseball), American baseball player
- Ray Clark (Paralympic athlete), gold medalist in athletics at the 1972 Summer Paralympics and again in 1976

== See also ==
- Ray Clarke (disambiguation)
