= Olav Vadstein =

Norwegian professor (born 1955)

Olav Vadstein (born 14 February 1955) is a Norwegian professor of Microbial Ecology at the Norwegian University of Science and Technology.

According to his web page, Vadstein is interested in aquatic ecosystems

"both natural and unnatural (human created). Besides basic aspects, I’m interested in applied microbial ecology, which can be placed under the heading Environmental Biotechnology."

His most highly cited papers are:

- J. Skjermo, O. Vadstein, Techniques for microbial control in the intensive rearing of marine larvae in Aquaculture, 77, Issues 1–4, 1 July 1999, Pages 333-343- cited 378 times according to Google Scholar
- Vadstein O. (2000) Heterotrophic, Planktonic Bacteria and Cycling of Phosphorus. In: Schink B. (eds) Advances in Microbial Ecology vol 16. Springer, Boston, MA- cited 184 times
- Vadstein, O. The use of immunostimulation in marine larviculture: possibilities and challenges. Aquaculture Volume 155, Issues 1–4, 20 September 1997, Pages 401–417 Cited 179 times
