= BMC Biotechnology =

Academic journal published by BioMed Central

- Discipline: Biotechnology
- Language: English

Publication details
- History: 2001–present
- Publisher: BioMed Central
- Frequency: Continuous
- Open access: Yes
- License: Creative Commons Licenses
- Impact factor: 3.5 (2023)

Standard abbreviations
- ISO 4: BMC Biotechnol.

Indexing
- ISSN: 1472-6750

Links
- Journal homepage

BMC Biotechnology is a peer-reviewed open-access scientific journal that covers the field of biotechnology, focusing on areas such as genetic engineering, plant biotechnology, environmental biotechnology, and industrial biotechnology.

== Abstracting and indexing ==
The journal is abstracted and indexed in:

- DOAJ
- EBSCO databases
- ProQuest databases
- Scopus
- Science Citation Index Expanded

According to the Journal Citation Reports, the journal has a 2023 impact factor of 3.5.
