= Ray Clarke =

Ray Clarke may refer to:

- Ray Clarke (Australian footballer) (1908–1971), Australian rules footballer for North Melbourne
- Ray Clarke (English footballer) (born 1952), English professional footballer
- Ray Clarke (rugby union) (1908–1972), New Zealand rugby union international

== See also ==
- Raymond Clark (disambiguation)
