= Jackie King =

South African water scientist (1945–2025)

- Born: 1945
- Died: January 2025 (aged 79–80)
- Citizenship: South Africa
- Education: University of Cape Town(Zoology and Chemistry)
- Alma mater: University of Cape Town
- Occupations: Scientist, researcher

Jackie King (1945 – January 2025) was a South African water scientist. She was an internationally recognized aquatic ecosystems researcher and advocate for maintaining environmental flows in rivers that were being considered for development. Her work influenced water resource management policies worldwide, among others stimulating inclusion of environmental flows for river maintenance in South Africa's 1998 National Water Act, recognition of the need to compensate downstream communities for deterioration of river health in the Lesotho Highlands Water Project, and awareness of environmental flows in the work of the Mekong River Commission.

== Education ==
Jackie King began her academic career as a young mother in Cape Town. In 1973 she earned a BSc in Zoology and Chemistry at the University of Cape Town and studied macroinvertebrate fauna in the Eerste River in Stellenbosch for fieldwork to support a University of Cape Town PhD that she was awarded in 1983.

== Scientific career ==
King was instrumental in formation of the University of Cape Town's Freshwater Research Unit, where she was a researcher, lecturer, and supervisor of postgraduates from 1975 to 2008. She formed a consulting firm, Water Matters, focused on the science of integrated flow management in 2000. In 2012 she was appointed Extraordinary Professor at the University of the Western Cape's Institute for Water Studies, continuing to work as a consulting expert in China, Laos, Cambodia, Pakistan, Vietnam, South America and throughout southern Africa, where she provided formative advice to the region's growing family of transboundary river basin organizations. In later years she frequently collaborated with Dr Cate Brown of Southern Waters Ecological Research and Consulting.

In 2016 King received the Gold Medal of the Southern African Society of Aquatic Scientists and was the 2016 recipient of WWF-SA’s Living Planet Award. In 2018 King was elected an international member of the American Academy of Arts and Sciences. She was winner of the 2020 Stockholm Water Prize for her contributions to global river management.

Throughout her career, she contributed her knowledge and experience to building capacity and published science.

She served on the Board of Directors of the Worldwide Fund for Nature South Africa, the Research Advisory Panel of South Africa’s Council for Scientific and Industrial Research and as a Senior Scientific Advisor to the International Crane Foundation.

== Later life and death ==
King was, in her semi-retirement, an active community volunteer, becoming a SANParks Honorary Ranger, patrolling the trails that she also visited regularly while walking with her dogs. She died in January 2025.

In 2026, Dr King's colleague Cate Brown published The River is a Book, a memoir that documents their joint work in southern Africa and other countries.
