= Bruce Rittmann =

American professor of environmental engineering

Bruce E. Rittmann
- Born: November 17, 1950 (age 76); St. Louis, Missouri
- Citizenship: United States
- Education: Washington University in St. Louis; Stanford University
- Known for: Pioneering the development of biofilm fundamentals and their widespread use in the cleanup of contaminated waters, soils, and ecosystems; linking of molecular microbial ecology and geochemistry to environmental engineering processes
- Spouse: Marylee MacDonald
- Children: 5
- Awards: Joan Hodges Queneau Palladium Medal, American Association of Engineering Societies, American Association of Engineering Societies, (2014); BioCluster Award, International Water Association and International Society for Microbial Ecology (2014); Distinguished Member, American Society of Civil Engineers (2012); Simon W. Freese Environmental Engineering Award and Lecture, American Society of Civil Engineers (2009); Member, National Academy of Engineering (2004); A. R. I. Clarke Prize for Outstanding Achievement in Water Science and Technology, National Water Research Institute (1994); and Walter L. Huber Research Prize, American Society of Civil Engineers (1990)
- Scientific career
- Fields: Environmental biotechnology and environmental engineering
- Workplaces: Arizona State University
- Doctoral advisor: Perry McCarty
- Notable students: Lutgarde Raskin
- Website: http://rittmann.environmentalbiotechnology.org

Bruce E. Rittmann is Regents' Professor of Environmental Engineering and Director of the Swette Center for Environmental Biotechnology at the Biodesign Institute of Arizona State University. He was also elected a member of the National Academy of Engineering in 2004 for pioneering the development of biofilm fundamentals and contributing to their use in the cleanup of contaminated waters, soils, and ecosystems.

== Biography ==
Rittmann was born in St. Louis, Missouri to Albert and Ruth Rittmann. He moved to Affton, Missouri at age 4 and attended Reavis Elementary School and Affton High School. In 1974, he received the BS degree in Civil Engineering and MS degree in Environmental and Sanitary Engineering from the School of Engineering at Washington University in St. Louis. After working as an environmental engineer with Sverdrup & Parcel in 1974-1975, he moved to Stanford University, where he received the PhD in Environmental Engineering in 1979. His PhD adviser was Perry L. McCarty.

Rittmann joined the faculty in the Department of Civil Engineering at the University of Illinois Urbana-Champaign in 1980 as an assistant professor. He was promoted to associate and full professor in 1984 and 1988. In 1992, Rittmann moved to Northwestern University to become the John Evans Professor and Area Coordinator of Environmental Engineering.

In 2005, he moved to Arizona State University to start the Center for Environmental Biotechnology in the newly formed Biodesign Institute. He was named a Regents’ Professor in 2009, and the Center was endowed as the Swette Center for Environmental Biotechnology in 2011.

Rittmann was the President of the Association of Environmental Engineering and Science Professors in 1990-91, the same organization’s Distinguished Lecture in 2004, chairman of two National Research Council (NRC) committees concerning in situ bioremediation, vice-chairman of the NRC’s Water Science and Technology Board, and Editor-in-Chief of Biodegradation.

Rittmann is married to Marylee MacDonald and the step father of her five children.

== Research ==
=== Biofilm modeling ===
Rittmann developed mathematical models of biofilms, communities of microorganisms attached to solid surfaces. While some biofilms cause infections or surface fouling, his research emphasizes their beneficial role in water treatment. His work integrates microbiological, chemical, and transport processes within biofilms, accounting for substrate gradients, metabolic products, and microbial diversity.

=== Molecular microbial ecology ===
Working with David Stahl, Rittmann helped introduce molecular biology methods into environmental engineering, contributing to the development of environmental biotechnology. This field applies molecular microbial ecology to study the genetic makeup and functions of microbial communities in engineered and natural systems. In collaboration with Rosa Krajmalnik-Brown, he has used these approaches to investigate microbial processes involved in pollution control, resource recovery, and human health.

=== Microbial products ===
Rittmann and colleagues were the first to define soluble microbial products (SMP), organic molecules released by microorganisms into their environment. With Chrysi Laspidou, he developed a unified model linking SMP, extracellular polymeric substances (EPS), and active biomass, which has been applied across microbiological processes to explain their roles in effluent quality and biomass composition.

A 2014 review by Jia Kang and colleagues described incorporating microbial-product generation and degradation into the Laspidou-Rittmann theory as one of three approaches to modeling soluble microbial products in biological water treatment.

=== Bioremediation ===
Rittmann’s PhD work addressed the removal of organic micropollutants in aquifers and later expanded to chlorinated solvents, petroleum hydrocarbons, and radionuclides. He chaired National Academy of Sciences committees that produced influential reports on in situ bioremediation (1993) and natural attenuation (2000).

=== Membrane biofilm reactors ===
Rittmann invented the hydrogen-based membrane biofilm reactor (MBfR), which uses hydrogen-oxidizing bacteria on gas-transfer membranes to reduce pollutants such as nitrate, perchlorate, and uranium. He holds patents on the technology, which has been commercialized and received the 2011 Environmental Engineering Excellence Award.

In these reactors, hydrogen passes through membranes to bacteria growing on their outer surfaces. The bacteria use the hydrogen to drive reactions that reduce contaminants such as nitrate and perchlorate. The membrane supplies hydrogen directly to the attached microbial community, combining gas delivery and biological treatment in the same system.

=== Microbial energy production ===
Rittmann has also studied the use of cyanobacteria to produce fuel precursors. In a 2011 interview with The Atlantic, he described his group's work on modifying photosynthetic bacteria to release long-chain fatty acids that could be collected and converted into fuel components. The approach sought to recover substances released by the bacteria rather than processing the entire microbial biomass.

=== Photobioenergy ===
His group develops photobioreactors that use photosynthetic microorganisms to convert sunlight and CO₂ into biomass and chemical feedstocks. In collaboration with Willem Vermaas, he investigates methods to generate renewable fuels and chemicals from CO₂.

=== Microbial electrochemical cells ===
Working with César Torres and Sudeep Popat, Rittmann studies microbial electrochemistry, in which anode-respiring bacteria transfer electrons to electrodes to produce electricity, hydrogen, or other reduced products from organic waste streams.

=== Intestinal microbial ecology ===
With Rosa Krajmalnik-Brown and Andrew Marcus, Rittmann investigates gut microbial communities and their impact on human health. Their work uses genomics, metabolomics, and modeling to study microbial interactions and explore ways to promote beneficial microbes.

== Selected publications ==
- [Rittmann, Bruce E.; McCarty, Perry L. (2001). Environmental Biotechnology: Principles and Applications. New York, NY: McGraw-Hill. ISBN 978-0-07-118184-6.
- Zhang, H., DiBaise, J. K., Zuccolo, A., Kudrna, D., Braidotti, M., Yu, Y., et al. (2009). Human gut microbiota in obesity and after gastric bypass. Proceedings of the National Academy of Sciences, 106(7), 2365–2370. doi:https://doi.org/10.1073/pnas.0812600106
- Laspidou, C. S., & Rittmann, B. E. (2002). A unified theory for extracellular polymeric substances, soluble microbial products, and active and inert biomass. Water Research, 36(11), 2711–2720. doi:https://doi.org/10.1016/S0043-1354(01)00413-4
- Mobarry, B. K., Wagner, M., Urbain, V., Rittmann, B. E., & Stahl, D. A. (1996). Phylogenetic probes for analyzing abundance and spatial organization of nitrifying bacteria. Applied and Environmental Microbiology, 62(6), 2156–2162. doi:https://doi.org/10.1128/aem.62.6.2156-2162.1996
- Raskin, L., Stromley, J. M., Rittmann, B. E., & Stahl, D. A. (1994). Group-specific 16S rRNA hybridization probes to describe natural communities of methanogens. Applied and Environmental Microbiology, 60(4), 1232–1240. doi:https://doi.org/10.1128/aem.60.4.1232-1240.1994
- Wu, L., Ning, D., Zhang, B., Li, Y., Zhang, P., Shan, X., Zhang, Q., Brown, M. R., Li, Z., et al. (2019). Global diversity and biogeography of bacterial communities in wastewater treatment plants. Nature Microbiology, 4(7), 1183–1195. doi:https://doi.org/10.1038/s41564-019-0426-5
- DiBaise, J. K., Zhang, H., Crowell, M. D., Krajmalnik-Brown, R., Decker, G. A., et al. (2008). Gut microbiota and its possible relationship with obesity. Mayo Clinic Proceedings, 83(4), 460–469. doi:https://doi.org/10.4065/83.4.460
- Rittmann, B. E. (2008). Opportunities for renewable bioenergy using microorganisms. Biotechnology and Bioengineering, 100(2), 203–212. doi:https://doi.org/10.1002/bit.21875
- Mayer, B. K., Baker, L. A., Boyer, T. H., Drechsel, P., Gifford, M., Hanjra, M. A., et al. (2016). Total value of phosphorus recovery. Environmental Science & Technology, 50(13), 6606–6620. doi:https://doi.org/10.1021/acs.est.6b01239

=== Books ===
- Committee on In Situ Bioremediation; Commission on Engineering and Technical Systems; Division on Engineering and Physical Sciences; National Research Council (1993). Bruce Rittmann (ed.). In Situ Bioremediation: When Does It Work?. Washington, DC: Routledge. ISBN 978-0309048965.
- Rittmann, B. E.; E. Seagren; B. A. Wrenn; A. J. Valocchi; C. Ray; L. Raskin (1995). In Situ Bioremediation. Park Ridge, NJ: William Andrew, Inc. ISBN 978-0815513483.
- Committee on Intrinsic Remediation; Water Science and Technology Board; Board on Radioactive Waste Management; National Research Council; Commission on Intrinsic Remediation (2000). Bruce Rittmann (ed.). Natural Attenuation for Groundwater Remediation. Washington, DC: National Academy Press. ISBN 978-0309069328.
- Rittmann, Bruce; McCarty, Perry (2001). Environmental Biotechnology: Principles and Applications. New York: McGraw-Hill. ISBN 978-0071181846.

=== Refereed journal papers ===
Complete list

== Awards ==
- Fellow of the American Association for the Advancement of Science (AAAS), Association of Environmental Engineering and Science Professors (AEESP), and National Academy of Inventors (NAI)
- Best Scientific Development Award, Platinum Global Science Awards (2026)
- Distinguished Fellow, International Water Association (2026) and International Engineering and Technology Institute (2025)
- Ardern & Lockett Award, Microbial Ecology and Water Engineering Specialists Group, International Water Association (2025)
- International Science and Technology Collaboration Award from the Peoples’ Republic of China (2024)
- Camp Applied Research Award from the Water Environment Federation (WEF) (2021)
- Rudolph Hering Medal, American Society of Civil Engineers (2021)
- Stockholm Water Prize (2018) for revolutionizing water treatment.
- Gordon Maskew Fair Award, American Academy of Environmental Engineers and Scientists (AAEES) (2016)
- BioCluster Award, International Water Association and Internation Society for Microbial Ecology (IWA/ISME) (2014)
- ISME/IWA[BR1] BioCluster Award (2014)
- Joan Hodges Queneau Palladium Medal, American Association of Engineering Societies (AAES) (2014)
- Fellow, Water Environment Federation (WEF) (2013)
- Honorary Member, American Academy of Environmental Engineers and Scientists (AAEES) (2013)
- Distinguished Member, American Society of Civil Engineers (ASCE) (2012)
- Fellow, International Water Association (IWA) (2012)
- Environmental Engineering Excellence Award, American Academy of Environmental Engineers (2011)
- Regents’ Professor, Arizona State University (2009)
- Simon A. Freese Award and Lecture, American Society of Civil Engineers (2009)
- Member, National Academy of Engineering (2004)
- Distinguished Lecturer, Association of Environmental Engineering and Science Professors (2004)
- Fellow, American Association for the Advancement of Sciences (1996)
- A. R. I. Clarke Prize for Outstanding Achievement in Water Science and Technology, National Water Research Institute (1994)
- Walter L. Huber Civil Engineering Research Prize, American Society of Civil Engineers (1990)
- Academic Achievement Award, American Water Works Association; with Jacques
- University Scholar, University of Illinois (1987)
- Xerox Faculty Research Award, College of Engineering, University of Illinois at Urbana-Champaign (1985)
- Presidential Young Investigator Award, National Science Foundation (1984)
