= Irina Chakraborty =

Russian-Finnish-Indian environmental engineer

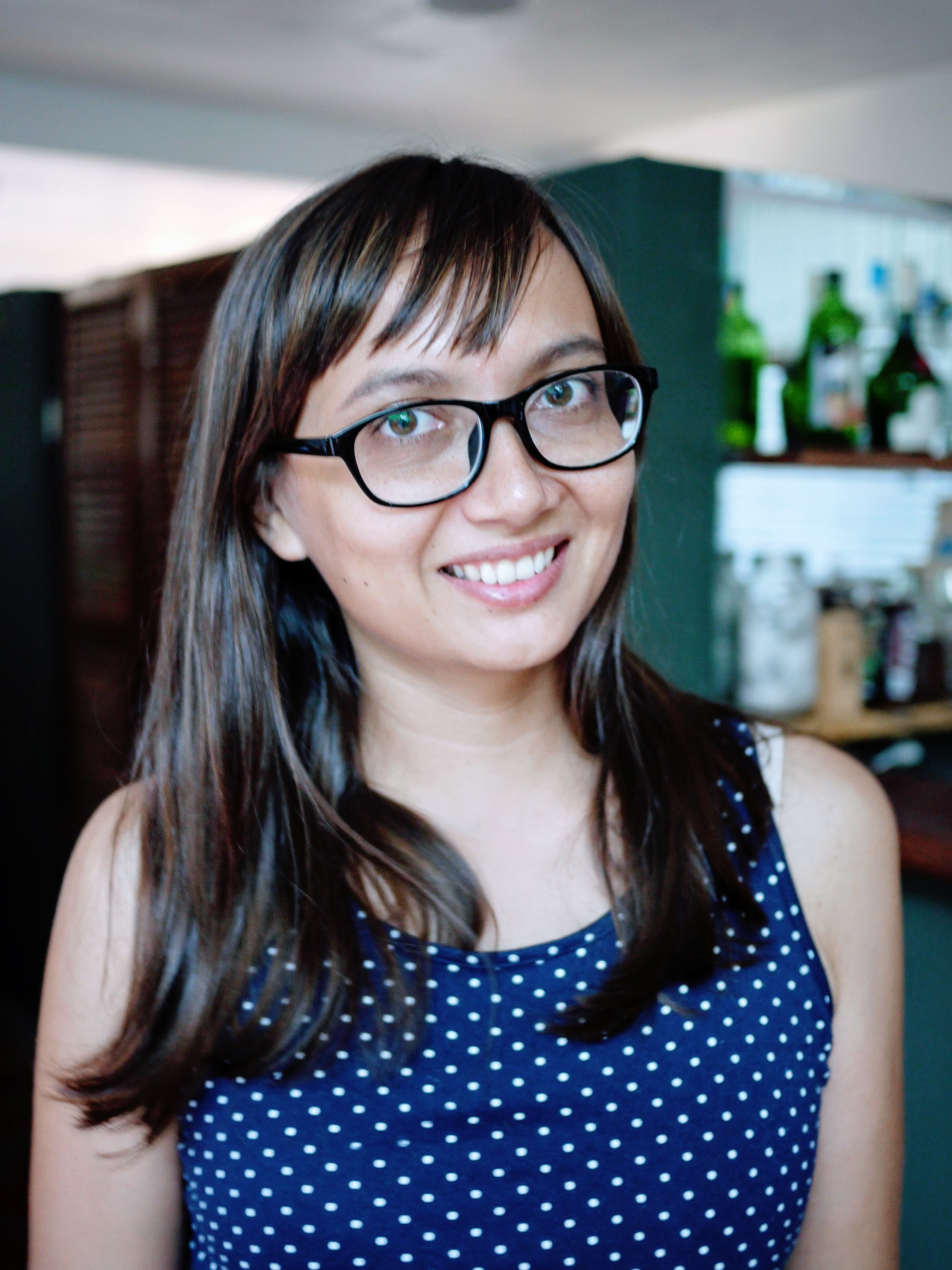
- Irina Chakraborty in December 2017
- Born: 1980 or 1981 (age 45–46); Leningrad, Soviet Union
- Citizenship: Finnish

Irina Chakraborty (Russian: Ирина Чакраборти, Bengali: ইরিনা চক্রবর্তী, born 1980 or 1981) is a Russian-Finnish-Indian scientist, an environmental engineer and a university instructor. She has lived in Phnom Penh, Cambodia since 2011. She was selected as one of BBC'S 100 Women in 2013 for her work with sanitation for floating villages.

== Early life ==
Chakraborty was born in Leningrad, Soviet Union (now Saint Petersburg, Russia), to Finnish-Indian parents. She is a Finnish citizen. She studied microbiology in Finland.

She was awarded a Fulbright Graduate Grant in 2004.

In 2020 she created an online sustainability group in Cambodia.

In 2024 she was part of a team which won the annual J. James R. Croes Medal.
