= John Briscoe (water engineer) =

South African environmental engineer (1948–2014)

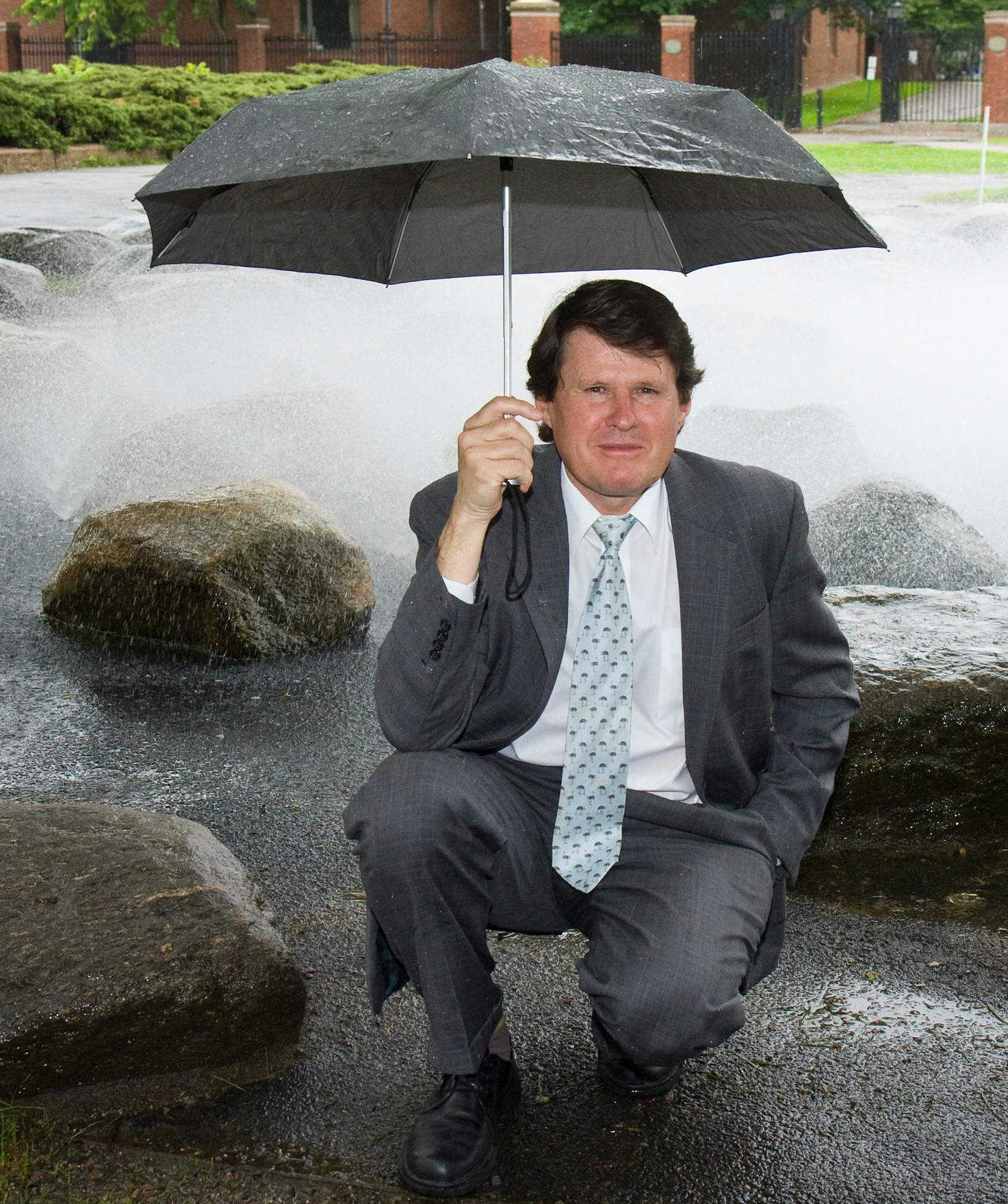
- John Briscoe at the Science Center, Harvard University.
- Born: July 30, 1948; South Africa
- Died: November 12, 2014 (aged 66); Poolesville, Maryland
- Citizenship: South Africa And Ireland; permanent resident (Green card) in US
- Education: Harvard (BSc, MSc, PhD)
- Known for: global water security
- Spouse: Conceição Andrade
- Children: 4
- Awards: Stockholm Water Prize - "Nobel Prize of Water”; Grande Medalha da Inconfidência, one of Brazil’s highest awards; Stroud Prize for Excellence in Water; Hauser Grant for Innovation in Learning and Teaching, Harvard University
- Scientific career
- Fields: environmental engineering, water engineering, environmental health, global water security
- Workplaces: OXFAM, World Bank, University of North Carolina, Harvard School of Public Health, Harvard Kennedy School of Government, Harvard School of Engineering and Applied Sciences (SEAS)

John Briscoe (July 30, 1948 – November 12, 2014) was a South African environmental engineer who was visiting professor of the Practice of Environmental Health in the Department of Environmental Health at Harvard School of Public Health. He was known as "Mr. Water" to environmental economists. At Harvard, Briscoe also held appointments at the Harvard School of Engineering and Applied Sciences (SEAS) as Gordon McKay Professor of the Practice of Environmental Engineering, and at the Harvard Kennedy School. His career focused on efforts on the developing world to successfully manage and preserve water as a precious resource. In early 2014, he received the Stockholm Water Prize - the “Nobel Prize of Water" - for "unparalleled contributions to global and local management of water - contributions covering vast thematic, geographic, and institutional environments-that have improved the lives and livelihoods of millions of people worldwide.”

He spoke English, Afrikaans, Bengali, Portuguese, and Spanish.

== Chronology ==
- 1948 - Born in South Africa
- 1969 - B.Sc., Civil Engineering, University of Cape Town, Cape Town, South Africa
- 1976 - Ph.D., Environmental Engineering, Harvard University
- Government water agencies of South Africa and Mozambique, Engineer
- Cholera Research Center, now ICDDR,B, Bangladesh, Epidemiologist
- University of North Carolina, Professor of Water Resources
- 1989-2009 - World Bank (20 years): He helped oversee projects in water resources, irrigation, hydropower, and sanitation at the World Bank and consulted on water issues for nonprofits, governments, nongovernmental organizations, and businesses
- 1989-2009 - World Bank, country director for Brazil: Briscoe's role in affecting the evolution of the World Bank was the subject of Chapter 13 in Sebastian Mallaby's definitive history, “The World’s Banker,” Penguin 2006.
- 2009-2014 - Professor of Environmental Health, Harvard School of Public Health, Boston, MA
- 2014 - Stockholm Water Prize - "Nobel Prize of Water”

== Early life ==
John Briscoe was born in, and grew up in, South Africa. His mother Thelma ran a day-care center and orphanage in the black township of Soweto. His nation's extremes of poverty and wealth were seen in the social and ecological landscape, the lush coastal regions contrasted with the dry but economically important interior, where massive mineral mining operations were carried out. He described realizing that understanding water was fundamental to understanding the development of South African resources and the many social and economic inequalities of the continent. He continued developing these views while living in the interior of Bangladesh, where he witnessed how water projects and flood-protection and electrification could improve human lives greatly. He spent the rest of his career controlling water, whether for environmental or human purposes, and crusading.

A native of South Africa, John earned a bachelor's degree in civil engineeringat the University of Cape Town in 1969, an M.S. in environmental engineering in 1972, and a Ph.D. in environmental engineering at Harvard University in 1976. Before coming to Harvard, he worked as an engineer in the government water agencies of South Africa and Mozambique; an epidemiologist at the Cholera Research Center, now ICDDR,B in Bangladesh; a professor of water resources at the University of North Carolina; and, for 20 years, at the World Bank, where he helped oversee projects in water resources, irrigation, hydropower, and sanitation. He has consulted on water issues for nonprofits, governments, nongovernmental organizations, and businesses.

At Harvard, John launched the university-wide Harvard Water Security Initiative, which focuses on major challenges in countries around the world, including the ability to provide people with safe drinking water and food, to produce energy and sustain economic growth, and to enhance environmental quality. He taught popular undergraduate and graduate courses on water and was nominated for major teaching and mentoring awards. In addition, he led groups of students from across the university in collaborative research on water management in the Colorado, Indus, Mississippi, Murray-Darling, and Sao Francisco basins.

== Education ==
- 1965: Matriculated at St Patrick's Christian Brothers’ College Kimberley [Christian Brothers’ College]
- 1965-1969: B.Sc. (first class honours) in Civil Engineering, University of Cape Town, Cape Town, South Africa, conferred 1969
- 1970-1972: M.S. in Environmental Engineering, Harvard University, conferred 1972
- 1972-1976: Ph.D. in Environmental Engineering, Harvard University, conferred 1976

Major field: Water Resources Engineering; Minor fields: economics and demography

- 1993: Leadership Course at Center for Creative Leadership, Greensboro, North Carolina
- 1998: Executive Development Program—Harvard and Stanford Graduate Schools of Business

== Publications ==
John Briscoe has published widely in journals from many disciplines, including public health, nutrition, epidemiology, water resources, demography, anthropology, political science and economics. His publications include over 120 articles in refereed professional journals and eight books:

- Briscoe, John, Richard G. Feachem and Mujibur M. Rahaman, Evaluating Health Impact: Water Supply, Sanitation and Hygiene Education, IDRC Press, Ottawa, Canada, 80 pages, 1986.
- Briscoe, John and David de Ferranti, Water for Rural Communities: Helping People Help Themselves, World Bank, Washington DC, 32 pages, 1988.
- John Briscoe, Brazil: The New Challenge of Adult Health, World Bank, Washington DC, 133 pages, 1990 (in English and Portuguese). (Brazil/World Bank Country Partnership Strategy)
- The World Bank (Main author), The Water Strategy of the World Bank, Washington DC, February 2003.
- John Briscoe and RPS Malik, India's Water Economy: Bracing for a Turbulent Future. Oxford University Press, 2006.
- John Briscoe and RPS Malik (editors), Handbook on Water Resources Development and Management in India, Oxford University Press, 2007.
- John Briscoe and Usman Qamar, Pakistan's Water Economy: Running Dry, Oxford University Press, 2007.
- The World Bank (Main author), Country Partnership Strategy for Brazil, 2007-2010, Washington DC, 2007. (World Bank's Water Sector Strategy)

== Service ==
- Served on the Water Science and Technology Board of the National Academy of Sciences
- Founding member of the major global water partnerships

World Water Council
Global Water Partnership
World Commission on Dams

- Global Agenda Council, World Economic Forum
- High-Level Advisory Committee, Murray Darling Basin Authority
- Council Member, Distinguished Water Professionals, International Water Association
- Senior Water Advisor, McKinsey and Company

Consultancies

- World Bank
- Asian Development Bank
- US National Intelligence Council
- National Water Commission of Australia

== Awards ==
- 1965: Alan Spiers Memorial Bursary
- 1965: Max Michaelis Scholarship
- 1965: Barney Barnato Scholarship
- 1966-69: Electricity Supply Commission Bursary
- 1967: University Medal in Mathematics
- 1968: University Medals in Hydraulics, Hydrology, Transportation, Highways, Soil Mechanics and Thesis
- 1968: City of Cape Town Gold Medal as Best Graduating Engineering Student at the university
- 1968: South African Steel Institute Award for Best Structural Design
- 1968: E. Oliver Ashe Scholarship for Post-Graduate Study
- 1968: Cape Town City Scholarship for Post-Graduate Study

Harvard University:

- 1970-74: Harvard University Fellowship
- 1974: Clemons Herschel Prize (awarded annually to the outstanding graduating student in Environmental Engineering)
- As an employee of the World Bank was prohibited from receiving awards. Since leaving the World Bank has:

Been Nominated by Harvard University students for Harvard's Joseph Levenson Award to recognize exceptional teaching of undergraduates
Received the Grande Medalha de Inconfidencia, one of Brazil’s highest civilian honors (2009).
2009: International Water Association, The President’s Award

- 2009: Grande Medalha da Inconfidência, one of Brazil's highest awards
- Stroud Prize for Excellence in Water
- Hauser Grant for Innovation in Learning and Teaching, Harvard University
- 2014: Stockholm Water Prize - "Nobel Prize of Water”

== Death ==
Briscoe died at age 66 after a 2 1/2-year struggle with cancer.
