= Nicolas Moussiopoulos =

- Born: January 1, 1956 (age 70); Athens, Greece

Nicolas Moussiopoulos (Greek: Νικόλαος Μουσιόπουλος, born January 1, 1956, in Athens) is a Greek environmental engineer, honorary professor at the Karlsruhe Institute of Technology and former professor at the Aristotle University of Thessaloniki. His research interests include the field of Environmental Engineering (air quality assessments, atmospheric transport processes, circular economy).

He is a recipient of the Heinrich Hertz Award (1990), a member of the German National Academy of Sciences Leopoldina (2002), and a recipient of the Medal of Merit of KIT (2024).

== Biography and education ==
Moussiopoulos was born on January 1, 1956, in Athens, Greece. After graduating from the German School of Athens in 1973, he attended the University of Karlsruhe (TH) from 1973 to 1978, studying mechanical engineering. Prior to his graduation from KIT, he had a research stay at the Von Karman Institute for Fluid Dynamics in Sint-Genesius-Rode, Belgium. He completed his doctoral studies on transport phenomena at the University of Karlsruhe in 1982.

== Career ==
After completing his doctoral studies, he started lecturing at the University of Karlsruhe, where he led a research group that developed mathematical model systems to describe air pollutant dispersion and transformation. From 1986 to 1987, he also worked as a lecturer at the Gesamthochschule of Kassel. In 1988 he was supported under the Gerhard Hess Programme of the German Research Association.

After the completion of his postdoctoral lecture qualification ("Habilitation"), he was appointed Full Professor at the School of Mechanical Engineering of the Aristotle University of Thessaloniki. From 1990 he was also the head of this university's Sustainability Engineering Laboratory, formerly Laboratory of Heat Transfer and Environmental Engineering. The same year (1990) he received the Heinrich Hertz Award for his work in mathematical modelling of the dispersion and chemical transformation of atmospheric pollutants. In addition, since 1996 he is an honorary professor at KIT's School of Mechanical Engineering. In the periods 1997–1999 and 2003–2007, he chaired Aristotle University's School of Mechanical Engineering. From 2006 until 2010 he was the dean of the university's Faculty of Engineering. In 2008 he received the Aristotle University's Excellence and Innovation Award. In the periods 2014–2017 and 2019–2021, he was appointed head of the Energy Department, School of Mechanical Engineering of the Aristotle University of Thessaloniki.

From October 2010 until March 2016, Moussiopoulos served as the vice president of the International Hellenic University and dean of its School of Economics & Business Administration (until 2013).

Moussiopoulos was a consultant of the Greek minister Stefanos Manos, and represented Greece in numerous international committees. He is also an occasional columnist for various Greek mainstream newspapers like Ta Nea and To Vima.

Since 2002 he is a member of the German National Academy of Sciences Leopoldina. In the same year he was awarded the Order of Merit of the Federal Republic of Germany. In 2012 the Royal Society appointed him associate editor of Philosophical Transactions A. In 2015–2018 he was appointed General Secretary of the Hellenic Chapter of the Club of Rome. From June 2018 until 2021 he was an elected member of the Scientific Council of the Hellenic Foundation for Research and Innovation. From 2019 to 2023 he was a consultant of the German Federal Ministry for Economic Cooperation and Development on waste management issues in Greece. Since October 2021 he is the elected vice president of the Hellenic Solid Waste Management Association, responsible for international relations. He is also a current or past board member of foundations and institutions like the Museum for the Macedonian Struggle and Teloglion Fine Arts Foundation.

Moussiopoulos’ research focuses mainly on air pollution and climate change. He is renowned for his work and studies in air pollution control, and in the development of mathematical models that simulate the way pollutants spread and transform in the atmosphere.

== Selected publications ==
- Koroneos, C.; Spachos, Th.; Moussiopoulos, N. (2003). "Exergy analysis of renewable energy sources". Renewable Energy. 28 (2): 295–310. doi:10.1016/S0960-1481(01)00125-2.
- Assimakopoulos, V.D; ApSimon, H.M; Moussiopoulos, N (2003). "A numerical study of atmospheric pollutant dispersion in different two-dimensional street canyon configurations". Atmospheric Environment. 37 (29): 4037–4049. doi:10.1016/S1352-2310(03)00533-8.
- Koroneos, C; Dompros, A; Roumbas, G; Moussiopoulos, N (2004). "Life cycle assessment of hydrogen fuel production processes". International Journal of Hydrogen Energy. 29 (14): 1443–1450. doi:10.1016/j.ijhydene.2004.01.016.
- Cuvelier, C.; Thunis, P.; Vautard, R.;...Moussiopoulos, N.;...(2007). "CityDelta: A model intercomparison study to explore the impact of emission reductions in European cities in 2010". Atmospheric Environment. 41 (1): 189–207. doi:10.1016/j.atmosenv.2006.07.036.
- Vautard, R.; Builtjes, P.H.J.; Thunis, P.; Cuvelier, C.; Bedogni, M.; Bessagnet, B.; Honoré, C.; Moussiopoulos, N.; Pirovano, G.; Schaap, M. (2007). "Evaluation and intercomparison of Ozone and PM10 simulations by several chemistry transport models over four European cities within the CityDelta project". Atmospheric Environment. 41 (1): 173–188. doi:10.1016/j.atmosenv.2006.07.039.
- Maggos, Th.; Plassais, A.; Bartzis, J. G.; Vasilakos, Ch.; Moussiopoulos, N.; Bonafous, L. (2007-11-22). "Photocatalytic degradation of NOx in a pilot street canyon configuration using TiO2-mortar panels". Environmental Monitoring and Assessment. 136 (1–3): 35–44. doi:10.1007/s10661-007-9722-2. ISSN 0167-6369.
- Monks, P.S.; Granier, C.; Fuzzi, S.;...Moussiopoulos, N.;...(2009). "Atmospheric composition change – global and regional air quality". Atmospheric Environment. 43 (33): 5268–5350. doi:10.1016/j.atmosenv.2009.08.021.
- Moussiopoulos, N.; Achillas, C.; Vlachokostas, C.; Spyridi, D.; Nikolaou, K. (2010). "Environmental, social and economic information management for the evaluation of sustainability in urban areas: A system of indicators for Thessaloniki, Greece". Cities. 27 (5): 377–384. doi:10.1016/j.cities.2010.06.001.
- Saffari, Arian; Daher, Nancy; Samara, Constantini; Voutsa, Dimitra; Kouras, Athanasios; Manoli, Evangelia; Karagkiozidou, Olga; Vlachokostas, Christos; Moussiopoulos, Nicolas; Shafer, Martin M.; Schauer, James J.; Sioutas, Constantinos (2013-12-03). "Increased Biomass Burning Due to the Economic Crisis in Greece and Its Adverse Impact on Wintertime Air Quality in Thessaloniki". Environmental Science & Technology. 47 (23): 13313–13320. doi:10.1021/es403847h. ISSN 0013-936X.
- Achillas, C.; Moussiopoulos, N.; Karagiannidis, A.; Banias, G.; Perkoulidis, G. (2013). "The use of multi-criteria decision analysis to tackle waste management problems: a literature review". Waste Management & Research: The Journal for a Sustainable Circular Economy. 31 (2): 115–129. doi:10.1177/0734242X12470203. ISSN 0734-242X.
- Baklanov, A.; Schlünzen, K.; Suppan, P.;...Moussiopoulos N.;...(2014-01-10). "Online coupled regional meteorology chemistry models in Europe: current status and prospects". Atmospheric Chemistry and Physics. 14 (1): 317–398. doi:10.5194/acp-14-317-2014. ISSN 1680-7324.
- Sokhi, R. S.; Singh, V.; Querol, X.;...Moussiopoulos, N;...(2021). "A global observational analysis to understand changes in air quality during exceptionally low anthropogenic emission conditions". Environment International. 157: 106818. doi:10.1016/j.envint.2021.106818.
- Sokhi, R.S.; Moussiopoulos, N.; Baklanov, A.; Bartzis, J.; Coll, I.; Finardi, S.; Friedrich, R.; Geels, C.; Grönholm, T.; Halenka, T.; Ketzel, M.; Maragkidou, A.; Matthias, V.; Moldanova, J.; Ntziachristos, L. (2022-04-11). "Advances in air quality research – current and emerging challenges". Atmospheric Chemistry and Physics. 22 (7): 4615–4703. doi:10.5194/acp-22-4615-2022. hdl:2299/25592. ISSN 1680-7324.
