= Gedeon Dagan =

Israeli hydrologist

- גדעון דגן
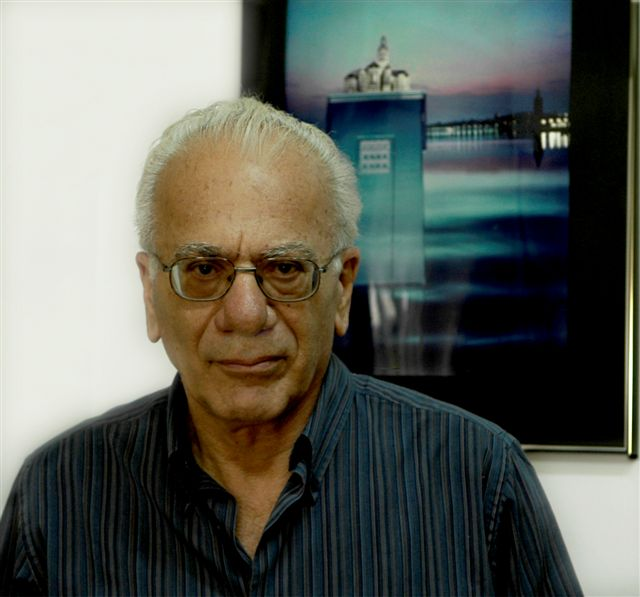
- Born: December 24, 1932 (age 93); Galați, Romania
- Education: Bucharest Institute of Civil Engineering, University of Bucharest
- Known for: Groundwater hydrology, stochastic hydrology
- Awards: Stockholm Water Prize (1998), Horton Medal (2005), Israel Prize in Earth and Atmospheric Sciences (2013), Member of the Israel Academy of Sciences and Humanities (2006)
- Scientific career
- Fields: Hydrology
- Workplaces: Tel Aviv University

Gedeon Dagan (Hebrew: גדעון דגן; born December 24, 1932) is a professor emeritus of hydrology, School of Mechanical Engineering, Faculty of Engineering, Tel Aviv University, Israel.

== Biography ==
Gedeon Dagan was born in Galați, Romania. His father, David Drimmer, was a civil engineer who grew up in Chernowitz, studied in Vienna and moved to Romania after marrying Janette Shechter. Romania was allied to Germany during the Second World War and though Jews underwent persecution, they were not sent to extermination camps, unlike those living in countries under German occupation. After the war he was active in a Zionist youth movement, striving to emigrate to Israel, but the borders were closed by the communist regime. With the desire to study in a field of relevance to Israel, he graduated in 1956 in hydraulic engineering at the Bucharest Institute of Civil Engineering. Being attracted by research, he also studied in parallel Applied Mathematics at the University of Bucharest. Subsequently, he worked as a research engineer at the national Hydraulic Laboratory in Bucharest and published a few articles in a local professional journal. In 1959 he was arrested and detained for eight months by the Securitate for alleged political Zionist activity.

In 1962 he was allowed to immigrate to Israel, where he changed his name from the previous one (Guido Drimmer) to Gedeon Dagan and married Ora (ne'e Sneh). He started to work as a research engineer at the Technion, Israel Institute of Technology, in a project of groundwater hydrology, which is the area of his research since. In 1965 he was granted a D. Sc. degree and joined the academic staff of the faculty of Civil Engineering, attaining the rank of full professor in 1974. His daughters Cigal and Noga were born in 1965, to be followed by Adi in 1971.

In 1976 he joined the academic staff of the newly founded Faculty of Engineering, Tel Aviv University, where he taught various courses in fluid mechanics, hydrology and environment, becoming a professor emeritus in 2000. During the years 1994-2003 he was the incumbent of the Klachky Chair of Groundwater Hydrology.

Dagan spent his first Sabbatical leave (1967) at the research company Hydronautics in United States. He was a visiting professor at University of Iowa (1974), at Delft University in the Netherlands (1975), at Princeton University (1979), at the University of California, Santa Barbara (1986), at the University of California, Berkeley (1991), at Pierre and Marie Curie University in Paris (1991) and at Imperial College in London (1995). A few of the graduate students he advised became leading scientists, e.g., Prof. Yoram Rubin (Berkeley), Prof. Michael Stiassnie (Technion), and Prof. Yhezkiel Mualem (Hebrew University).

== Research topics ==
Dagan’s research covers a variety of subjects in hydrology, applied mechanics, fluid mechanics and naval hydrodynamics. His main field of research is groundwater hydrology; he developed quantitative models, theoretical and applied, of water flow and contaminant transport in porous media (soil and aquifers). The models serve for the better understanding and prediction of processes occurring in the upper soil layer (irrigation, drainage) and in aquifers (exploitation, pollution).

He is one of the founders, in the late 1970s, of the new discipline of stochastic hydrology. Previously, soil and aquifers properties, mainly the permeability, were regarded as spatially homogeneous or well ordered. However, field measurements and even superficial observations, reveal that natural formations are generally heterogeneous. The spatial variability of permeability has a significant impact on water flow and contaminant spreading. Since medium properties vary in a seemingly erratic manner and measurements are generally scarce, their spatial distribution is subjected to uncertainty. Stochastic hydrology quantifies uncertainty with the aid of statistical models, used for analyzing and predicting various field scale processes. This approach has generated considerable interest due to its impact on modeling groundwater pollution, a process which increasingly affects deterioration of water qualify in different parts of the world. The new research field has attracted a large number of scientists, leading to the emergence of an active community.

== Scientific publications ==
Dagan has published above 230 articles in leading international journals. The ISI (Institute of Scientific Information) Web of Knowledge shows that his papers were cited by more than 4600 articles. His monograph (cited more than 2700 times according to Google Scholar) serves also as a graduate text book. ISI has identified him as one of the 250 most cited scientists in the fields of engineering and ecology/environment.

== Public professional activity ==
Dagan served as associate editor of a few international journals: Water Resources Research, Vadose Zone Journal, Journal of Hydrology, Journal of Contaminant Hydrology, Stochastic Hydrology and Hydraulics, Journal of Hydraulics Research, Multiscale Modeling and Simulation. He lectured at tens of international meetings and was among the organizers of an Unesco Symposium in Paris (1996) and an advanced workshop in Monte Verita, Ascona (2010). He served on various committees of the Israel Ministry of Science and Water Authority. In 1999 he initiated the Stockholm Junior Water Prize Competition in Israel and serves as its academic director since. Students from tens of high schools participate in the national competition and the winners attend the annual world competition in Stockholm.

== Honors and awards ==
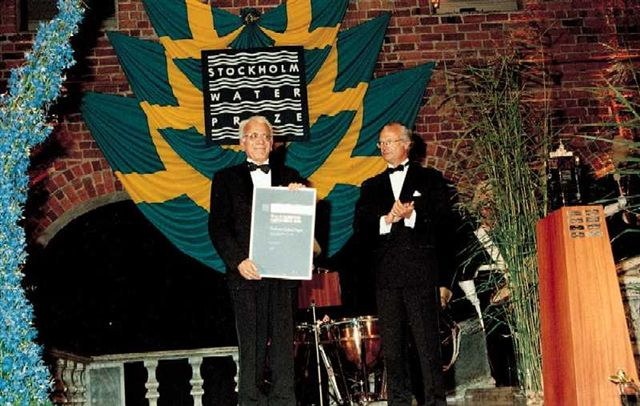
Gedeon Dagan receives the Stockholm Water Prize from the king of Sweden, 1998

- 2021 - InterPore Time Capsule Award
- 2013 - Israel Prize in Earth and Atmospheric Sciences
- 2012 - Doctor Honoris Causa, University "Frederico II", Napoli, Italy
- 2006 - Elected member of the Israel Academy of Sciences and Humanities
- 2006 - Rothschild Prize, Israel
- 2006 - Doctor Honoris Causa of the University of Bucharest
- 2005 - The Horton Medal, American Geophysical Union
- 2002 - Member of the ISI Highly Cited list of scientists in Engineering and Ecology/Environment
- 1998 - The Stockholm Water Prize
- 1997 - Doctor Honoris Causa of Pierre and Marie Curie University, Paris
- 1989 - Fellow of American Geophysical Union
- 1984 - Horton Award of the Hydrology section, American Geophysical Union

== A few selected articles ==
Fluid mechanics and water waves

- Dagan G. and M.P. Tulin, Two-dimensional gravity free-surface flow past blunt bodies, Journ. Fluid Mech., 51(3), 529-543, 1972.
- Dagan G., Taylor instability of free-surface nonuniform flows, Journ. Fluid Mech., 67, 113-124, 1975.
- Dagan G., Waves and wave resistance of thin bodies moving at low speed: the free-surface nonlinear effect, Journ. Fluid Mech., 69, 405-417, 1975.

Applied mechanics

- Fiori, I. Jankovic and Dagan G., Effective conductivity of heterogeneous multiphase media with circular inclusions, Phys. Rev. Let., Art. No. 224502, doi: 0.1103, 94(22), June 10, 2005.

Groundwater hydrology

- Dagan G., A method of determining the permeability and effective porosity of unconfined anisotropic aquifers, Water Resour. Res., 3 (4), 1059–1071, 1967.
- Dagan G. and E. Bresler, Unstaurated flow in spatially variable fields 1. Derivation of models of infiltration and redistribution, Water Resour. Res., 19(2), 413-420, 1983.
- Paster A. and Dagan G., Mixing at the interface between two fluids in porous media: a boundary layer solution, J. Fluid Mech. 584, 455-472, 2007.

Stochastic hydrology

- Dagan G. and E. Bresler, Solute dispersion in unsaturated heterogeneous soil at field scale I: Theory, Soil Science Soc. Am. Journ., 43(3), 461-467, 1979.
- Dagan G., Solute transport in heterogeneous porous formations, Journ. Fluid. Mech., 145, 151-177, 1984.
- Dagan G. Statistical theory of groundwater flow and transport: pore to laboratory, laboratory to formation and formation to regional scale, Water Resour. Res., Special Anniversary Edition, 22(9), 120S-135S, 1986.
- Dagan G. and C. Cvetkovic, Reactive transport and immiscible flow in geological media. I. General theory, Proc. Roy. Soc. London, Series A, 452(1945), 285-301, 1996.
- Dagan G., Solute plumes mean velocity in aquifer transport: impact of injection and detection modes, Water Resour. Res., 106, 6-10, 2017
