= Banrock Station Wetland Complex =

Wetland in Australia

- Location in South Australia
- Coordinates: 34°11′0″S 140°20′0″E
- Basin countries: Australia
- Managing agency: Accolade Wines
- Designation: Ramsar wetland
- Surface area: 13.75 square kilometres (5.31 sq mi)

Ramsar Wetland
- Designated: 21 October 2002
- Reference no.: 1221

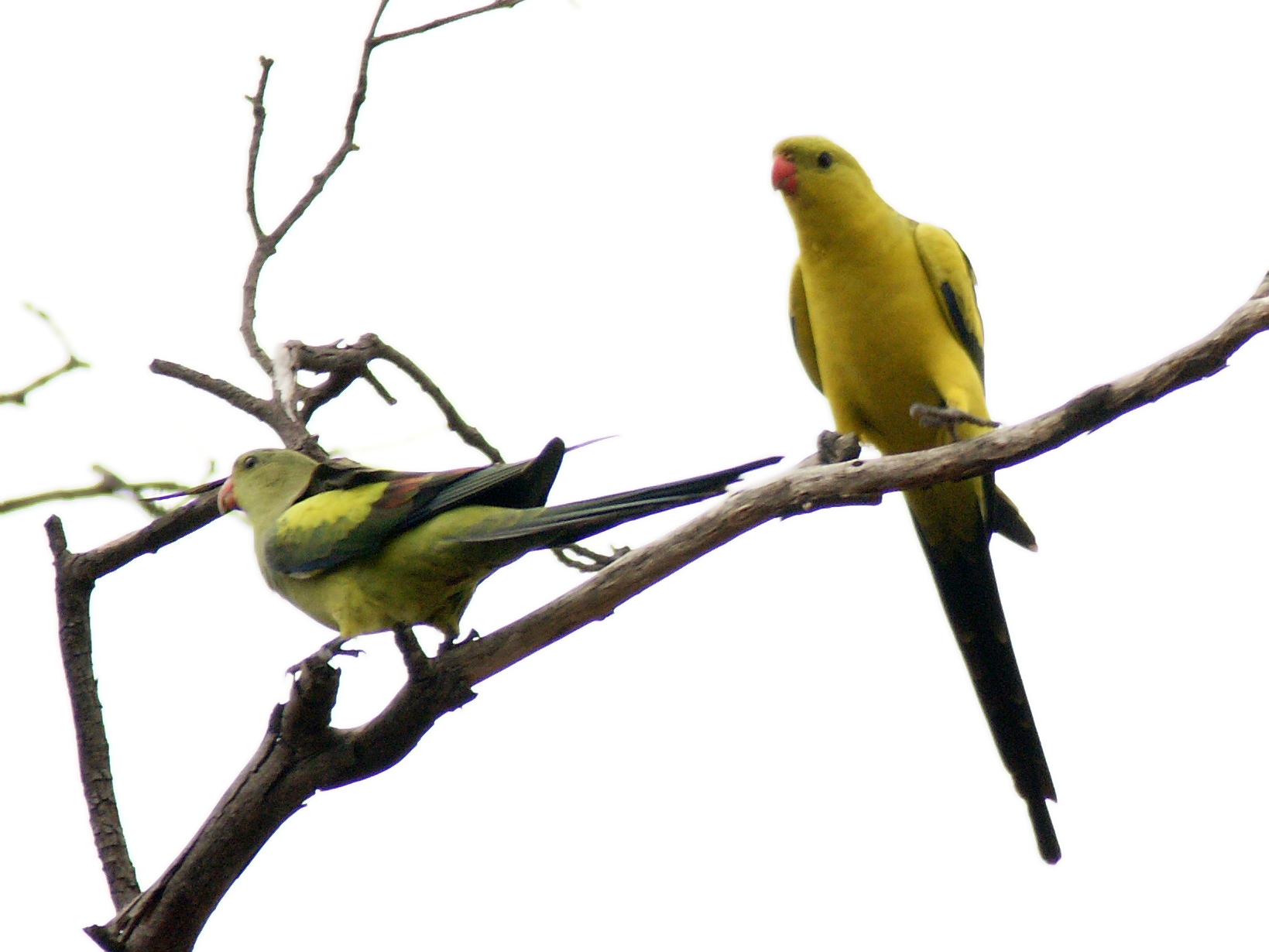
The wetlands support regent parrots

Banrock Station Wetland Complex is a wetland complex located in South Australia which has been recognised as being of international importance by designation under the Ramsar Convention. It was listed on 21 October 2002 as Ramsar site 1221. It lies in the Riverland region of south-eastern South Australia and is adjacent to the Murray River. It is a floodplain wetland subject to an ongoing environmental restoration program by a commercial organisation which manages the wetlands and promotes ecologically sustainable land use practices. In 2002 Banrock Station Wines received the Ramsar Wetland Conservation Award in recognition of its conservation efforts.

== History ==
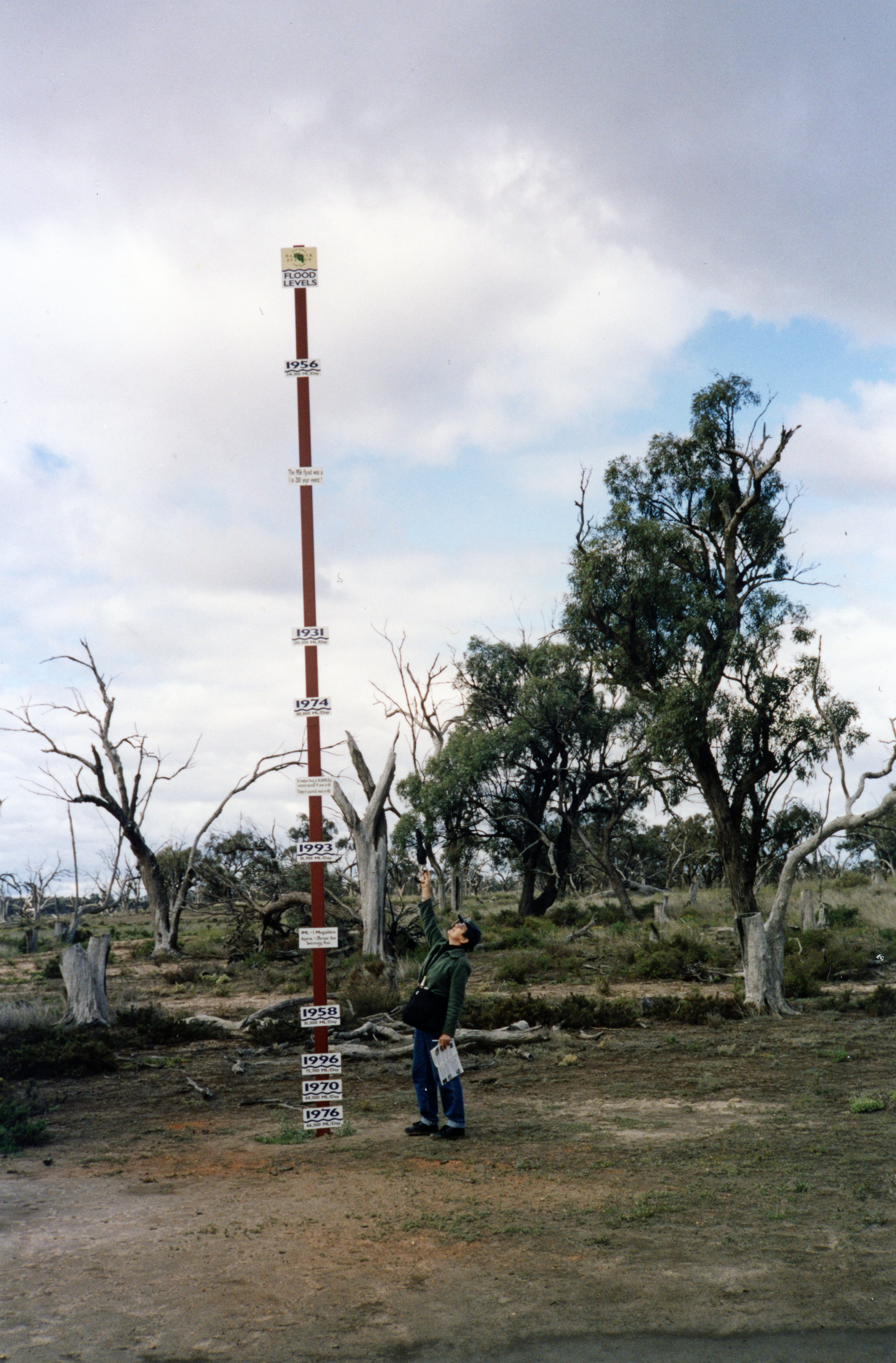
River Murray flood marker at Banrock

In 1952 Peter and Mavis (May) Jackson bought Peter's father, Bill Jackson's property, Banrock near Kingston on Murray. The property had many kilometres of frontage on to the River Murray, but since the installation of a downstream lock in 1923, much of its shore line had been flooded and degraded. They were mainly sheep and cattle farmers and were among the first people to plant wine grapes in the Riverland – planting Grenache, Doradillos and Gordos in the late 1950s. They sold Banrock in 1973 to Mr Langdon of Adelaide who onsold it later when it was used as a potato farm. BRL Hardy bought Banrock in 1994

Banrock Station is a largely viticultural property owned by, and producing wine for, Accolade Wines, the former Hardy Wine Company. The wetlands on the property had been permanently flooded since the early 20th century. In 1992 a program began to restore the natural hydrological regime of alternate wetting and drying cycles that the wetlands had before locks and weirs were installed on the Murray, with the first major drying out taking place in 2007.

== Flora and fauna ==
The 1,375-ha wetland comprises a lagoon with associated swamp vegetation. It supports several regionally or nationally threatened animals, including the southern bell frog, regent parrot and river snail. It provides habitat seasonally for several species of migratory waterbirds. It offers a route for fish migrating around Lock 3 on the Murray during spring floods and provides spawning and nursery habitats for them. Potential threats to the wetlands include invasion by introduced species and rising saline groundwater.
