= Augusta Henriques =

Secretary General of the NGO Tiniguena in Guinea-Bissau

- Born: 1952 (age 73–74)
- Occupations: Activist, educator, government minister
- Organization: Tiniguena
- Awards: Ramsar Wetland Conservation Award

Augusta Henriques (born 1952) is a Bissau-Guinean activist, educator and government minister, who in 2012 was the recipient of the Ramsar Wetland Conservation Award (Management).

In 1991, Henriques co-founded the non-governmental organisation Tiniguena, which campaigns for biodiversity action and community participation in Guinea-Bissau. She was also a founding trustee of the Foundation for Education with Production, a charity developed by Patrick van Rensberg.

Henriques has represented the country internationally, including as representative to the International Union for Conservation of Nature (IUCN). She also worked in the Ministry of National Education as Head of Adult Education.
