= Sarah Bell =

Australian environmental engineer and researcher

Sarah Jayne Bell
- Education: Murdoch University; University of New England; University of Western Australia
- Scientific career
- Workplaces: University College London
- Thesis: Researching sustainability: material semiotics and the Oil Mallee Project (2004)

Sarah Jayne Bell FICE CEng is an Australian environmental engineer. She is the City of Melbourne Chair in Urban Resilience and Innovation at the University of Melbourne, Australia, and Honorary Professor of Environmental Engineering at The Bartlett School in University College London (UCL). She works on urban water systems. She was the Director of the UCL Engineering Exchange during her 16 years as a Professor of Environmental Engineering at UCL.

== Early life and education ==
Bell studied chemistry and environmental engineering at the University of Western Australia and graduated with a Bachelor's of Science and Bachelor's of Engineering in 1996. She moved to the University of New England in Australia for her graduate studies and earned her master's degree in environmental management in 1999. Bell was a doctoral student at Murdoch University, where she worked on sustainability and technology policy and completed her PhD in 2004. In 2005, Bell joined University College London.

== Research and career ==
After moving to the United Kingdom, Bell was awarded an Engineering and Physical Sciences Research Council Research Fellowship on Living With Environmental Change. Her research considers urban water systems and infrastructure provision, and involves collaboration between engineers and their local communities. Bell has studied the ability of health systems to respond to climate change. She has worked with AECOM, Thames Water and Arup Group. She was promoted to Professor in September 2018.

Bell identified that there was not much collaboration between engineers, architects and local communities. In an effort to mitigate this lack of communication, Bell founded the University College London Engineering Exchange. She worked with UCL Urban Laboratory to launch a review into social housing, which identified that demolition decisions are often made by professional bodies without adequate engagement with residents. She is part of the Community Water Management for a Liveable London (CAMELLIA), which looks to improve decision making through community and industry engagement. As part of CAMELLIA Bell has looked to make London's water supply more sustainable.

Bell is committed to teaching and her efforts have been recognised by the Royal Academy of Engineering and University College London.

=== Selected publications ===
- Bell, Sarah; Johnson, Charlotte; Austen, Kat; Moore, Gemma; Teh, Tse-Hui (2023). Co-designing Infrastructures: Community collaboration for liveable cities. UCL Press. ISBN 9781800082229.
- Bell, Sarah (2018). Urban Water Sustainability: Constructing Infrastructure for Cities and Nature. Routledge. ISBN 9781138929906.
- Bell, Sarah (2016). "Assessment of building-integrated green technologies: A review and case study on applications of Multi-Criteria Decision Making (MCDM) method". Sustainable Cities and Society. 27: 106–115. doi:10.1016/j.scs.2016.06.013. hdl:2086/17084.
- Bell, Sarah (2015). "Renegotiating urban water". Progress in Planning. 96: 1–28. doi:10.1016/j.progress.2013.09.001.
