= Valerie M. Thomas =

American physicist and environmental engineer

Valerie Margaret Thomas
- Education: Cornell University
- Known for: Physicist, environmental engineer
- Awards: Fellow of the American Association for the Advancement of Science 2010 Excellence in Review Award, Environmental Science and Technology 2005 Fellow of the American Physical Society 1999
- Scientific career
- Workplaces: Princeton University, Research Scientist and Lecturer 1988-2004 Georgia Institute of Technology, Professor 2005 - Present

Valerie Margaret Thomas (born 1959) is an American physicist and environmental engineer, with broad research interests in environmental technology including aspects of the subject relating to materials science, energy systems, transportation and transportation energy use, and economics. She is the Anderson Interface Professor of Natural Systems at Georgia Tech, appointed jointly to the schools of industrial and systems engineering and public policy.

== Education and career ==
As a student, Thomas became interested in becoming a scientist through a fascination with quantum physics. She majored in physics at Swarthmore College, with a minor in mathematics, graduating in 1981. She earned her Ph.D. at Cornell University in 1986, working in theoretical high energy physics with Tung-Mow Yan as her doctoral advisor. Her dissertation was Aspects of two-dimensional quantum field theories.

After finishing her doctorate, she shifted her focus to environmental science, with a postdoctoral research visit to Carnegie Mellon University, where she worked with Granger Morgan in the Department of Engineering and Public Policy. She then worked as a research scientist and lecturer at Princeton University from 1988 to 2004, affiliated with the Princeton Environmental Institute and Princeton School of Public and International Affairs. From 2004 to 2005 she worked as a Congressional Science Fellow for New Jersey congressman Rush Holt Jr., and in 2005 she took her present position at Georgia Tech.

== Recognition ==
Thomas was named a Fellow of the American Physical Society (APS) in 1998, after a nomination from the APS Forum on Physics and Society, "for her efforts to build an active interface between the science of materials and pollutants, and the avenues mechanisms necessary to build sound management strategies, and to build international networks of environmental science and policy researchers". She was elected as a Fellow of the American Association for the Advancement of Science in 2000.
