= Suthan Suthersan =

- Born: 10 June 1956; Jaffna, Sri Lanka
- Died: 20 February 2017 (aged 60); Hopewell Township, Mercer County, New Jersey
- Education: Jaffna Central College, University of Peradeniya, Asian Institute of Technology, University of Toronto
- Occupations: Environmental engineer (with specializations in geomicrobiology, geomorphology, mineralogy)
- Spouse: Sumathy Suthersan
- Children: 2
- Website: suthansuthersan.com

Suthan Suthersan (10 June 1956 – 20 February 2017) was an environmental engineer; he served as the chief technical officer and executive vice president of Arcadis North America.

== Early life ==
Dr. Suthersan had his childhood education at the rural schools of Sri Lanka in Mankulam, Kodikamam, Valaichenai, Wattegama and Pesalai due to his father's career at Sri Lanka Railways. He joined Jaffna Central College for his secondary education.

He entered the engineering faculty at the University of Peradeniya and went for his master's degree at the Asian Institute of Technology. He did his Ph.D. in environmental engineering at the University of Toronto.

== Career ==
He joined Clean Harbors in Boston, a pure hazardous waste handling and removal company, and then the Groundwater Technology Inc. at their corporate office in Norwood, Massachusetts.

He later joined Geraghty and Miller which headquartered in Long Island. There he had come under the guidance of David Miller; he introduced him to Steve Blake and both encouraged and enabled him to build the technical foundation to make Geraghty and Miller, which later became Arcadis North America.

== Bibliography ==
- Suthan S. Suthersan, Fred C. Payne (2004), In Situ Remediation Engineering, CRC Press, ISBN 978-1-5667-0653-7
