= Olentangy River Wetland Research Park =

Wetland preserve in Columbus, Ohio

Coordinates: 40.019°N 83.018°W

Designations

Ramsar Wetland
- Official name: Wilma H. Schiermeier Olentangy River Wetland Research Park
- Designated: 18 April 2008
- Reference no.: 1779

The Wilma H. Schiermeier Olentangy River Wetland Research Park is an experimental wetland complex located adjacent to the campus of Ohio State University in Columbus, Ohio, United States and is part of the School of Environment and Natural Resources at the university. Begun in 1992, the park has developed into a multitude of different habitats and setups which are used by OSU faculty and students for research. Additionally, the general public is welcome to enjoy independent tours of the area during daylight hours. Guided tours are also available upon request.

== Background ==
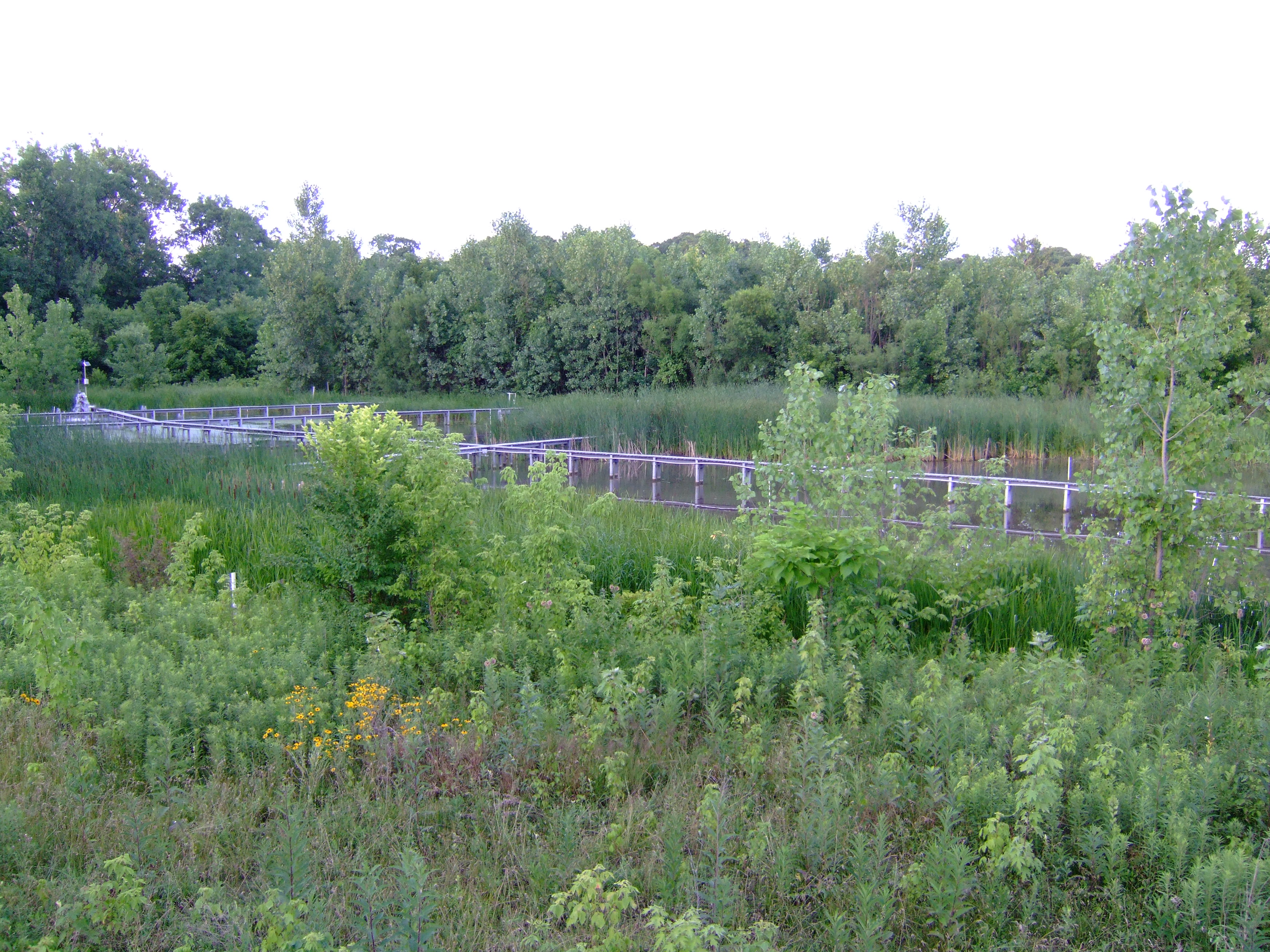
Experimental Wetland 1

The site is located on a 20-hectare (50-acre) parcel immediately north of the Chemical Abstracts Service campus along the banks of the Olentangy River. The research park creation and development has been led by Professor William J. Mitsch, who received the 2004 Stockholm Water Prize, partially because of his development of this research park. The first stage of the complex was completed in 1994 when two 1 ha (2.5-acre) kidney shaped marshes were built. Water in these areas is continuously pumped in from the river providing a consistent water level thought the year. Experimental Wetland 1 (west) was planted with wetland plants native to the area, while Experimental Wetland 2 (east) was left unplanted. This experiment into how wetlands develop is monitored every year and the differences noted. Boardwalks were constructed in the following years (1995 & 1996) to allow access to the wetland without disturbing the sediment. These boardwalks are normally closed to the public except during guided tours to prevent disturbance to the ongoing experiments.

In 1999, a 3 ha (7-acre) Billabong was constructed to the southeast of the two experimental wetlands as part of the second phase of the park. This area replicates the habitat that might be found at an oxbow lake. Water is gravity fed into the system from the Olentangy River only during times of high flow. Visitors are sometimes surprised to see the area almost totally devoid of water. However, this is completely normal, particularly during the summer months. A Mesocosm Compound for smaller scale research was built at the same time as the Billabong.

A 5 ha (12-acre) bottomland hardwood forest on the site was restored in 1999-2000 when 4 breaches in an artificial levee were created to allow the river to flood the forest again. Studies have suggested that it is a more productive forest now. In addition, the invasive Eurasian honeysuckle (Lonicera mackii) is occasionally harvested in this forest to allow a more diverse understory to develop.

The third phase culminated in the construction of the Heffner Wetland Research and Education Building in 2003. Along with the building, three small wetlands were built. A stormwater wetland collects precipitation that falls on the roof of the building and allows it to be filtered. A pond that was dug deep enough to reach the water table provides a continuous supply of water to the adjacent swale. To the west of the building is a small decorative wetland and an emerging red maple swamp.

In June 2008, the Olentangy River Wetland Research Park was formally designated as the USA's 24th Ramsar Wetland of International Importance. This is one of the first created wetland sites so designated in the world and was done so in recognition of the diverse flora and fauna at the site, the extensive wetland research that has taken place there, and the significant ecotourism at this urban wetland where 150 tours per year are given to thousands of visitors, educating them on the functions and values of wetlands.
