= Ross E. McKinney =

American scientist and professor (1926-2021)

- Born: 2 August 1926; San Antonio, Texas
- Died: 18 September 2021 (aged 95); Durham, North Carolina
- Citizenship: American
- Education: Massachusetts Institute of Technology, Southern Methodist University
- Scientific career
- Fields: Environmental engineering
- Workplaces: Massachusetts Institute of Technology, University of Kansas, Duke University
- Notable students: Perry McCarty, Daniel A. Vallero

Ross E. McKinney is an American scientist and professor of environmental engineering. He is best known for his contributions to the biological engineering of wastewater treatment.

McKinney was a member of faculty of the Massachusetts Institute of Technology when he moved to the University of Kansas to begin the program in environmental engineering. Before he retired in 1993, McKinney held the first NT Veatch Distinguished Professorship of Civil Engineering.

McKinney was elected a member of the National Academy of Engineering in 1977 for contributions to the development of biological wastewater treatment processes and to the advancement of the environmental engineering profession.
