= Perry McCarty =

American scientist and professor (1931-2023)

Perry L. McCarty
- Born: October 29, 1931; Grosse Pointe, Michigan, U.S.
- Died: June 4, 2023 (aged 91); Stanford, California, U.S.
- Education: Wayne State University; MIT
- Scientific career
- Fields: Environmental engineering
- Workplaces: Stanford University
- Academic advisors: Ross E. McKinney
- Notable students: Bruce Rittmann
- Website: profiles.stanford.edu/perry-mccarty

Perry L. McCarty (October 29, 1931 – June 4, 2023) was an American scientist and professor of environmental engineering. He is best known for his contributions to the environmental engineering profession through education, research, and service to government and industry.

== Biography ==
McCarty earned his B.S. in civil engineering from Wayne State University. He completed his M.S. in sanitary engineering from Massachusetts Institute of Technology in 1957 and his Sc.D. from MIT in 1959. From 1962, he was a member of the faculty of Stanford University, where he held the Silas H. Palmer Professorship of civil engineering.

McCarty was a Fellow of the American Academy of Arts and Sciences, the American Academy of Microbiology, the American Association for the Advancement of Science, and the Water Environment Federation. He was a lifetime honorary member of the American Academy of Environmental Engineers and Scientists, the American Society of Civil Engineers, the American Water Works Association, the Association of Environmental Engineering and Science Professors, and the Water Environment Federation.

McCarty was elected a member of the National Academy of Engineering in 1977 for contributions to the environmental engineering profession through education, research, and service to government and industry. In 1992, he received the Tyler Prize for Environmental Achievement, in 1997 he received the Athalie Richardson Irvine Clarke Prize for outstanding achievements in water science and technology, and in 2007, he received the Stockholm Water Prize citing, "his [McCarty's] pioneering work in developing the scientific approach for the design and operation of water and wastewater systems." In August, 2016, Stanford named him an "engineering hero".

McCarty died in Stanford, California on June 4, 2023, at the age of 91.
