= Everglades Wetland Research Park =

The Everglades Wetland Research Park is a teaching and research facility of Florida Gulf Coast University. It is located at the Naples Botanical Garden, in Naples, Florida, USA.

The facility's focus is the function and importance of wetlands, with an emphasis on the restoration and conservation of wetlands in the Florida Everglades and Big Cypress Swamp, as well as around the world.

William J. Mitsch is the director since 2012.
