= Therese Flapper =

Environmental engineer

- Education: University of New South Wales
- Occupation: Engineer
- Known for: Water Sustainability

Therese Flapper is an Australian environmental engineer, and was elected to be a fellow of the Australian Academy of Technological Sciences and Engineering, in 2023. She has worked with infrastructure including water, roads, waste, energy and buildings, and was past president of Engineers Australia, Canberra, and the local Landcare group.

== Education ==
Flapper was one of two girls from her class of 120, in the Western Suburbs of Sydney, to go to university. She lived in housing commission accommodation, and needed to travel more than two hours each way to get to university.

Her first year of university involved living in the backyard of her grandmother's housing commission house.

“Then my grandmother kicked my uncle out of the house so I could have his room. I was the ant’s pants to my grandmother, the bee’s knees. She would brag about me to everyone. She was incredibly supportive of me and my determination to go to uni...To me, education was a way to bust you out. But ‘busting out’ meant breaking down a lot of walls."

Flapper was awarded a Bachelor of Science (honours) from the University of New South Wales (UNSW) in 1991, and a Masters of Engineering Sciences from UNSW in 1996. She graduated with a PhD in Engineering Sciences for her thesis "Development of a fungal bioreactor to treat industrial wastewater" in 2001, also from UNSW.

== Career ==
Flapper was the Business Group Manager of GHD's Business Group Manager from 2011 to 2015. Flapper was deputy president for the Australian arm of the International Water Association (IWA), and also is the President of NSW Australian Water Association. She was also president of Engineers Australia, Canberra.

Flapper has worked with the local community as a volunteer bush firefighter with the NSW Rural Fire Service, and she was also the President of the local Landcare group.

Flapper has worked with the independent audit of the Molonglo Valley Strategic Assessment, "Protecting Molonglo", and the Strategic Assessment of the region, including, and species protected under the Environmental Protection and Biodiversity Act 1999, including Pink-tailed Worm-lizard, Superb and Swift parrots, Grasslands and Box-Gum woodland.

== Publications ==
- McGill, G, Horner, R, Flapper, T. (2014) Reclaimed water for the Shoalhaven region: Expansion of the existing REMS to double the volume of available reclaimed water in the northern Shoalhaven City Council local government area. Water: Journal of the Australian Water Association: 1 September 2014.
- Flapper, T. Benjamin, R. Mosse, P (2003) Online, real time measurement of Cod and SS at Lower Molonglo WQCC.
- Flapper, T. Campbell, B. O’Connor, N. (2010) SWF Project No 512-001 Quantification of pathogen removal in Australian activated sludge plants.

== Awards ==
- 2023 – ATSE – Fellow.
- 2022 – NSW RFS Commissioners award – for service to NSW during the 2019/2020 fire season.
- 2020 – National Emergency Services Medal.
- 2021 – Crystal Vision Award.
- 2007 – Women of the Year (Nancy Mills) – Australian Water Association
- 2000 – National Engineers Excellence Award – Engineers Australia.
