= Tami Bond =

American scientist and academic

- Education: University of Washington (BS); University of California, Berkeley (MS); University of Washington (PhD)
- Awards: MacArthur Award (2014), National Science Foundation CAREER Award (2004); Fellow of the American Geophysical Union (2015)
- Scientific career
- Fields: Engineering; Atmospheric Science
- Institutions: University of Illinois; Colorado State University
- Website: www.hiwater.org

Tami Bond is an American environmental engineer and atmospheric scientist. She holds the Walter Scott Jr. Presidential Chair in Energy, Environment and Health at Colorado State University since 2019. For many years she was a professor of Civil and Environmental Engineering at the University of Illinois, and an affiliate professor of Atmospheric Science. Bond has focused research on the effective study of black carbon or soot in the atmosphere. She is a Fellow of the American Geophysical Union. A MacArthur Fellowship was awarded to her in 2014.

== Education ==
Tami Bond received a Bachelor of Science degree in mechanical engineering from the University of Washington in 1993. She went on to graduate study at the University of California at Berkeley, where she was awarded a Masters of Science in engineering in 1995, focusing on combustion. In 2000, she completed study for an interdisciplinary Doctor of Philosophy degree in Atmospheric Sciences, Civil Engineering and Mechanical Engineering, again from the University of Washington.

== Career and scholarship ==
When discussing how she became interested in engineering, Bond noted, "I was poor and had a car that broke, and I had to fix it. It was frustrating but satisfying." In the late 1980s, she apprenticed in an auto body shop and became curious about how cars were made. She wanted to know about their design, not just to fix automobiles but to improve them. These experiences and others eventually led her to engineering

According to the MacArthur Foundation, Bond's laboratory and field research into quantifying the sources and effects of black carbon, as well as its optical and physical properties in the atmosphere, have provided the most comprehensive data on this pollutant and its effects as of 2014. Bond has expressed a specific interest in having her research bring a difference to the practical lives of individuals.

In 2003, Bond joined the faculty at department of Civil and Environmental Engineering at the University of Illinois. She then became an affiliate professor in Atmospheric Sciences in 2007. In 2014, Bond was named a Nathan M. Newmark Distinguished Professor.

Bond joined the Colorado State University's department of Mechanical Engineering in 2019 as the Walter Scott Jr. Presidential Chair in Energy, Environment and Health.

== Awards ==
In addition to the MacArthur Award, Bond is the recipient of the National Science Foundation CAREER Grant, and the Nauman Faculty Scholar Award. She has also received the Xerox Faculty award and the Center for Advanced Study at the University of Illinois fellowship.

In 2015, she was named a Fellow of the American Geophysical Union and was an ISI Highly Cited Researcher.

In 2017, she was granted the Outstanding Publication Award by the American Association for Aerosol Research.

In 2018, the University of Washington honored Bond with a Diamond Award for Distinguished Achievement in Academia.

== Selected publications ==
- Bounding the role of black carbon in the climate system: A scientific assessment
- A technology‐based global inventory of black and organic carbon emissions from combustion
- Light absorption by carbonaceous particles: An investigative review
