= Nancy G. Love =

American engineer

Nancy Gail Love
- Education: Clemson University; University of Illinois Urbana-Champaign
- Scientific career
- Workplaces: University of Michigan
- Thesis: The impact of growth in a dual substrate limited environment on the stability and expression of a TOL plasmid (1994)

Nancy Gail Love is an American engineer who is the JoAnn Silverstein Distinguished University Professor of Environmental Engineering at the University of Michigan. She is the former President of the Association of Environmental Engineering and Science Professors and a Fellow of the International Water Association and the Water Environment Federation. In 2021 she was awarded the AEESP Frederick George Pohland Medal.

== Early life and education ==
Love was an undergraduate student in civil engineering at the University of Illinois Urbana-Champaign. She completed her bachelor's and master's degrees in Chicago before moving to Clemson University as a doctoral researcher in environmental engineering.

== Research and career ==
Love is an environmental engineer who makes use of chemistry and biology to identify and eliminate contaminants in water. She was the first to study microbial stress in biological treatment systems. She joined the University of Michigan in 2008, where she founded the Environmental Biotechnology Laboratory.

During the Flint water crisis, Love set up Train-the-Trainers, a curriculum which trained residents of Flint to fit faucet-mounted water filters. She has worked with the Flint Technical Advisory Committee on Water. She has worked on the development of decentralized water systems for low income countries. As part of this effort, Love trained students in Addis Ababa in how to design effective decentralized infrastructure.

Love is a past president of the Association of Environmental Engineering and Science Professors.

== Awards and honors ==
- Fellow of the Association of Environmental Engineering and Science Professors, International Water Association and the Water Environment Federation.
- 1993 AAUW Fellow
- 1995 National Science Foundation CAREER Award
- 2001 Water Research Foundation Paul L. Busch Award
- 2008 Water Environment Federation Rudolfs Industrial Waste Management Medal
- 2011 Water Environment Federation Gordon Maskew Fair Distinguished Engineering Educator
- 2015 Association of Environmental Engineering and Science Professors Distinguished Lecturer
- 2019 Association of Environmental Engineering and Science Professors Kappe Lecturer
- 2020 Association of Environmental Engineering and Science Professors Science Award
- 2020 CEEAA Distinguished Alumni Award
- 2021 Association of Environmental Engineering and Science Professors Frederick George Pohland Medal

== Selected publications ==
- Love, Nancy G. (2011). Biological wastewater treatment. C. P. Leslie Grady (3 ed.). Boca Raton, FL. ISBN 978-1-4200-0963-7. OCLC 880899871.

=== Journal articles ===
- Jeremy S Guest; Steven J Skerlos; James L Barnard; et al. (14 July 2009). "A New Planning and Design Paradigm to Achieve Sustainable Resource Recovery from Wastewater". Environmental Science & Technology. 43 (16): 6126–6130. doi:10.1021/es9010515. ISSN 0013-936X. PMID 19746702. Wikidata Q38435125.
- Adam L. Smith; Lauren B. Stadler; Nancy G. Love; Steven J. Skerlos; Lutgarde Raskin (25 April 2012). "Perspectives on anaerobic membrane bioreactor treatment of domestic wastewater: a critical review". Bioresource Technology. 122: 149–159. doi:10.1016/j.biortech.2012.04.055. ISSN 0960-8524. PMID 22608937. Wikidata Q38011481.
- R David Holbrook; John T Novak; Thomas J Grizzard; Nancy G Love (1 November 2002). "Estrogen receptor agonist fate during wastewater and biosolids treatment processes: a mass balance analysis". Environmental Science & Technology. 36 (21): 4533–4539. doi:10.1021/es020577b. ISSN 0013-936X. PMID 12433161. Wikidata Q43358882.
