= William J. Mitsch =

American ecologist

William J. Mitsch, Ph.D.
- Awards: National Wetland Award, U.S. EPA and Environmental Law Institute (1996); Odum Lecturer, University of Georgia (1998); Stockholm Water Prize (2004); Theodore M. Sperry Award, Society for Ecological Restoration International (for a career in ecosystem restoration, 2005); Lifetime Achievement Award, Society of Wetland Scientists (2007); Einstein Professorship, Chinese Academy of Sciences, Beijing (2010); Doctorate honoris causa, Tartu University, Estonia (2010); Certificate for Concurrent Professorship, Nanjing Forestry University, China (2011); The Ramsar Convention Award for Merit (2015); Outstanding Wetland Scientist Award, 10th INTECOL (International Association of Ecology) Wetland Conference, Changshu, China (2016); Odum Award, American Ecological Engineering Society (2018)
- Scientific career
- Fields: wetland ecology and biogeochemistry; wetland and river restoration; ecological engineering; systems ecology
- Workplaces: Illinois Institute of Technology, University of Louisville, Ohio State University, Florida Gulf Coast University

William Mitsch (March 29, 1947 – February 12, 2025) was an ecosystem ecologist and ecological engineer who was co-laureate of the 2004 Stockholm Water Prize in August 2004 as a result of a career in wetland ecology and restoration, ecological engineering, and ecological modelling.

== History ==
Mitsch was born in Wheeling, West Virginia, US, on March 29, 1947. He graduated from Wheeling Central Catholic High School in Wheeling, West Virginia, in 1965 and University of Notre Dame in 1969 where he majored in mechanical engineering. He then worked for two years in the power industry—for American Electric Power in Ohio and for Commonwealth Edison in Chicago. It was at the latter utility that he became part of their then-new environmental planning staff in 1970, being influenced by the first Earth Day in May 1970. He then went to the University of Florida in Gainesville and received an M.E. degree (1972) and Ph.D. (1975) in environmental engineering sciences. In his Ph.D. program he transitioned to become more of an ecologist, studying wetlands and lakes in Florida under Professor H. T. Odum. Prior to arriving at Florida Gulf Coast University in late 2012, he was on the faculties at Illinois Institute of Technology (1975–79), University of Louisville (1979–85), and, for 26 years at Ohio State University (1986–2012).

== Contributions ==
His most significant contributions are 1. development of the field of ecological engineering as an author of the first book on this subject and the founder (in 1992) and editor-in-chief of the scientific journal Ecological Engineering, 2. creation of the Olentangy River Wetland Research Park, a unique 20-hectare (50-acre) wetland research laboratory and now Ramsar Wetland of International Importance at The Ohio State University, 3. major contributions toward the development of the field of wetland ecology, particularly as first author of five editions of the standard textbook Wetlands, a book that continues to be used around the world to teach wetland ecology. That book has educated several generations of wetland scientists since it was first introduced in 1986. Dr. Mitsch's research has emphasized wetlands for nutrient removal in the agricultural Mississippi-Ohio-Missouri (MOM) River Basin (Mitsch et al. 2001, 2012, 2014) and more recently to protect the Florida Everglades (Mitsch et al. 2015; Marois and Mitsch 2015a; Mitsch 2016a; Mitsch et al., 2018) and Lake Erie in the Laurentian Great Lakes (Mitsch et al., 2017). His recent research continues to focus on solving harmful algal blooms, including red tide, with treatment wetlands and restored landscapes (Griffiths and Mitsch, 2017; Nesbit and Mitsch, 2018; Mitsch, 2018) and also on the ecosystem service of natural and restored/created wetlands in mitigating climate change (Mitsch et al. 2010, 2013; Villa and Mitsch, 2015; Marois and Mitsch 2015b; Li and Mitsch, 2016; Mitsch 2016b; Mitsch and Mander, 2018).

Mitsch is currently Eminent Scholar and Director, Everglades Wetland Research Park, Florida Gulf Coast University, Naples, Florida. Before October 2012 he was Distinguished Professor of Environment and Natural Resources at The Ohio State University and Director of the university's Wilma H. Schiermeier Olentangy River Wetland Research Park. His research and teaching has focused on wetland biogeochemistry, wetland creation and restoration, ecological engineering, and ecosystem modeling. Dr. Mitsch has authored or co-authored over 600 papers, books, published abstracts and other publications in ecological and environmental science. He is co-author or co-editor of 20 books including senior author of Ecological Engineering (1989), Ecological Engineering and Ecosystem Restoration (2004), 5 editions of Wetlands (1986–2015), and Wetland Ecosystems (2009).

Mitsch has served on committees of the Science Advisory Board (SAB) of the U.S. Environmental Protection Agency (2001–2011) and on several United States National Research Council (NRC) committees of the National Academy of Sciences (1991–2004).

His international activity includes serving as a Fulbright Senior Specialist at the Harry Oppenheimer Okavango Research Centre, University of Botswana in 2007 and at the Bialystok University of Technology in Poland in 2016, a Fulbright Fellow, University of Copenhagen, Denmark (1986–1987) and an advisor/researcher for several Chinese universities; United Nations Environmental Programme, Egypt and Jordan; EARTH University, Costa Rica; IAMZ (Mediterranean Agronomic Institute of Zaragoza), Spain; SCOPE (Scientific Committee on Problems of the Environment), Paris, France; and MISTRA (Foundation for Strategic Environmental Research), Sweden, among other locations. He was chair of EcoSummit 2012 held in Columbus, Ohio, USA and is co-chair of EcoSummit 2016 held in Montpellier, France.

Among his awards, Mitsch and his colleague and frequent co-author Sven Jørgensen of Denmark received the 2004 Stockholm Water Prize from King Carl XVI Gustaf of Sweden on August 19, 2004, in Stockholm, Sweden. He also received the National Wetland Research Award (1996) from the U.S. Environmental Protection Agency and Environmental Law Institute, the Theodore M. Sperry Award (2005) for a career in ecosystem restoration from the Society for Ecological Restoration, a SWS Lifetime Achievement Award (2007) from the Society of Wetland Scientists (SWS), an Einstein Professorship from the Chinese Academy of Sciences (2010), and The Ramsar Convention Award for Merit presented at Ramsar Committee of Party (COP) 12th Congress, Puenta del Este, Uruguay on June 3, 2015. His Olentangy River Wetland Research Park at Ohio State University became the 24th USA Ramsar Wetland of International Importance in June 2008 from the Ramsar Convention in Switzerland. In 2010, he was awarded Doctorate honoris causa by the University of Tartu in Estonia.

== Videos ==
William Mitsch on Wetland Preservation - CCTV China 2015

Bill Mitsch discusses wetlands and watersheds CHNEP September 2013

Wetlands are crucial to help clean up water on YouTube

iMix: Wetland on YouTube

== Selected publications ==
About William Mitsch

- "Black Swamp Savior: How Bringing Back Conquered Wetlands Could Help Solve Harmful Algal Blooms" Lori Balster, Environmental Monitor, July 31, 2018
- "Restoration of historic Great Black Swamp could help save Lake Erie" Tom Henry, Toledo Blade September 22, 2017
- "Learning to Love the Great Black Swamp: Midwest settlers worked for generations to tame the wicked swamplands west of Lake Erie. Can they be convinced to give some back?" Sharon Levy, UNDARK March 31, 2017
- "Wheeling Central Grad Comes Home" Heather Ziegler, The Intelligencer / Wheeling News-Register 9 August 2015
- "Wetland warrior: Professor brings expertise to environmental front line: The Everglades" Drew Sterwald, Pinnacle, Florida Gulf Coast University's Magazine November 2012
- "A life bogged down: Biologist Bill Mitsch spent career at Ohio State creating world-class wetlands" Spencer Hunt, 2012. Columbus Dispatch 30 September 2012
- Inman, Mason (2010). "Working with water". Nature Reports Climate Change. 1 (1004): 39–41. doi:10.1038/climate.2010.28.
- Lenart, Melanie (2009). "An unseen carbon sink". Nature Reports Climate Change. 1 (912): 137–138. doi:10.1038/climate.2009.125.
- Waist-deep in Ecological Integrity, Notre Dame Magazine, University of Notre Dame, Spring 2006
- Under Ground by Yvonne Baskin, Island Press, 2005, Chapter VI "Microbes, Muck, and Dead Zones"
- Sven Erik Jørgensen, Denmark; William J. Mitsch, USA, Stockholm International Water Institute, 2004

By William Mitsch

Selected Books

- Mitsch, W.J. and J.G. Gosselink. 2015. Wetlands, 5th ed., John Wiley & Sons, Inc., New York
- Mitsch, W.J., J.G. Gosselink, C.J. Anderson, and L. Zhang. 2009. Wetland Ecosystems, John Wiley & Sons, Inc., New York, 295 pp.
- Mitsch, W.J. and S.E. Jørgensen. 2004. Ecological Engineering and Ecosystem Restoration. John Wiley & Sons, New York. 472 pp.
- Mitsch, W.J. and S.E. Jørgensen. 1989. Ecological Engineering: An Introduction to Ecotechnology. John Wiley & Sons, New York. 472 pp.

Selected Journal Articles

- Bernal, B.; Mitsch, W.J. (2012). "Comparing carbon sequestration in temperate freshwater wetland communities". Global Change Biology. 18 (5): 1636–1647. Bibcode:2012GCBio..18.1636B. doi:10.1111/j.1365-2486.2011.02619.x. S2CID 86391591.
- Costanza, R.; Mitsch, W.J.; Day, J.W. (2006). "A new vision for New Orleans and the Mississippi delta: applying ecological economics and ecological engineering". Frontiers in Ecology and the Environment. 4 (9): 465–472. doi:10.1890/1540-9295(2006)4[465:anvfno]2.0.co;2.
- Day, J.W. Jr.; Hall, C.A.S.; Yáñez-Arancibia, A.; Pimentel, D.; Marti, C. Ibañez; Mitsch, W. J. (2009). "Ecology in times of scarcity". BioScience. 59 (4): 321–331. doi:10.1525/bio.2009.59.4.10. S2CID 86161742.
- Day, J.W. Jr.; Boesch, D. F.; Clairain, E. J.; Kemp, G. P.; Laska, S. B.; Mitsch, W. J.; Orth, K.; Mashriqui, H.; Reed, D. R.; Shabman, L.; Simenstad, C. A.; Streever, B. J.; Twilley, R. R.; Watson, C. C.; Wells, J. T. (2007). "Restoration of the Mississippi Delta: Lessons From Hurricanes Katrina and Rita". Science. 315 (5819): 1679–1684. Bibcode:2007Sci...315.1679D. doi:10.1126/science.1137030. PMID 17379799. S2CID 26092197.
- Hernandez, M.E.; Mitsch, W.J. (2007). "Denitrification in created riverine wetlands: Influence of hydrology and season". Ecological Engineering. 30: 78–88. doi:10.1016/j.ecoleng.2007.01.015. hdl:1811/24089. S2CID 98683105.
- Kusler, J; Mitsch, W.J.; Larson, J.S. (1994). "Wetlands". Scientific American. 270 (1): 64–70. Bibcode:1994SciAm.270a..64K. doi:10.1038/scientificamerican0194-64b.
- Li, X.; Mitsch, W.J. (2016). "Methane emissions from created and restored freshwater and brackish marshes in Southwest Florida, USA". Ecological Engineering. 91: 529–536. doi:10.1016/j.ecoleng.2016.01.001.
- Marois, D.E.; Mitsch, W.J. (2015a). "Modeling phosphorus retention at low concentrations in Florida Everglades mesocosms". Ecological Modelling. 319: 42–62. doi:10.1016/j.ecolmodel.2015.09.024.
- Marois, D.E.; Mitsch, W.J. (2015b). "Coastal protection from tsunamis and cyclones provided by mangrove wetlands--a review". International Journal for Biodiversity Science, Ecosystems Services and Management. 11: 71–83. doi:10.1080/21513732.2014.997292. S2CID 86554474.
- Mitsch, W.J. (2016a). "Restoring the Greater Florida Everglades, once and for all". Ecological Engineering. 93: A1–A3. doi:10.1016/j.ecoleng.2016.02.016.
- Mitsch, W.J. (2016b). "Wetlands and Climate Change". National Wetlands Newsletter. 38 (1): 5–11.
- Mitsch, W.J.; Zhang, L.; Marois, D.; Song, K. (2015). "Protecting the Florida Everglades wetlands with wetlands: Can stormwater phosphorus be reduced to oligotrophic conditions?". Ecological Engineering. 80: 8–19. doi:10.1016/j.ecoleng.2014.10.006.
- Mitsch, W.J.; Zhang, L.; Waletzko, E.; Bernal, B. (2014). "Validation of the ecosystem services of created wetlands: Two decades of plant succession, nutrient retention, and carbon sequestration in experimental riverine marshes". Ecological Engineering. 72: 11–24. doi:10.1016/j.ecoleng.2014.09.108.
- Mitsch, W.J.; Bernal, B.; Nahlik, A.M.; Mander, U.; Zhang, L.; Anderson, C.J.; Jørgensen, S.E.; Brix, H. (2013). "Wetlands, carbon, and climate change". Landscape Ecology. 28 (4): 583–597. doi:10.1007/s10980-012-9758-8. S2CID 11939685.
- Mitsch, W.J; Hernandez, M. (2013). "Landscape and climate change threats to wetlands of North and Central America". Aquatic Sciences. 75: 133–149. doi:10.1007/s00027-012-0262-7. S2CID 13894723.
- Mitsch, W.J; Zhang, L.; Stefanik, K. C.; Nahlik, A. M.; Anderson, C. J.; Bernal, B.; Hernandez, M.; Song, K. (2012). "Creating wetlands: Primary succession, water quality changes, and self-design over 15 years". BioScience. 62 (3): 237–250. doi:10.1525/bio.2012.62.3.5.
- Mitsch, W.J. (2012). "What is ecological engineering?". Ecological Engineering. 45: 5–12. doi:10.1016/j.ecoleng.2012.04.013. S2CID 145370880.
- Mitsch, W.J.; Nahlik, A.M.; Wolski, P.; Bernal, B.; Zhang, L.; Ramberg, L. (2010). "Tropical wetlands: Seasonal hydrologic pulsing, carbon sequestration, and methane emissions". Wetlands Ecology and Management. 18 (5): 573–586. doi:10.1007/s11273-009-9164-4. S2CID 41976725.
- Mitsch, W.J.; Lu; Yuan, X.; He, W.; Zhang, L. (2008). "Optimizing ecosystem services in China". Science. 322 (5901): 528. doi:10.1126/science.322.5901.528b. PMID 18948520. S2CID 206582797.
- Mitsch, W.J.; Zhang, L.; Fink, D.F.; Hernandez, M.E.; Altor, A.E.; Tuttle, C.L.; Nahlik, A.M. (2008). "Ecological engineering of floodplains". Ecohydrology & Hydrobiology. 8 (2–4): 139–147. doi:10.2478/v10104-009-0010-3.
- Mitsch, W.J.; Tejada, J.; Nahlik, A.M.; Kohlmann, B.; Bernal; Hernández, C.E. (2008). "Tropical wetlands for climate change research, water quality management and conservation education on a university campus in Costa Rica". Ecological Engineering. 34 (4): 276–288. doi:10.1016/j.ecoleng.2008.07.012.
- Mitsch, W.J.; Day, J.W.; Zhang, Li; Lane, R.R. (2005). "Nitrate-nitrogen retention by wetlands in the Mississippi River Basin". Ecological Engineering. 24 (4): 267–278. doi:10.1016/j.ecoleng.2005.02.005.
- Mitsch, W.J.; Day, J.W. Jr. (2004). "Thinking big with whole ecosystem studies and ecosystem restoration—A legacy of H.T. Odum". Ecological Modelling. 178 (1–2): 133–155. doi:10.1016/j.ecolmodel.2003.12.038.
- Mitsch, William J.; Day, John W. Jr.; Gilliam, J. Wendell; Groffman, Peter M.; Hey, Donald L.; Randall, Gyles W.; Wang, Naiming (2001). "Reducing nitrogen loading to the Gulf of Mexico from the Mississippi River Basin: Strategies to counter a persistent ecological problem". BioScience. 51 (5): 373–388. doi:10.1641/0006-3568(2001)051[0373:rnlttg]2.0.co;2. S2CID 87909881.
- Mitsch, W.J.; Wu, X.; Nairn, R.W.; Weihe, P.E.; Wang, N.; Deal, R.; Boucher, C.E. (1998). "Creating and restoring wetlands: A whole-ecosystem experiment in self-design". BioScience. 48 (12): 1019–1030. doi:10.2307/1313458. JSTOR 1313458.
- Mitsch, W.J.; Wilson, R.F. (1996). "Improving the success of wetland creation and restoration with know-how, time, and self-design". Ecological Applications. 6 (1): 77–83. doi:10.2307/2269554. JSTOR 2269554.
- Mitsch, W.J. (1995). "Restoration of our lakes and rivers with wetlands—an important application of ecological engineering". Water Science and Technology. 31 (8): 167–177. doi:10.1016/0273-1223(95)00369-x.
- Mitsch, W.J.; Cronk, J.K.; Wu, X.; Nairn, R.W.; Hey, D.L. (1995). "Phosphorus retention in constructed freshwater riparian marshes". Ecological Applications. 5 (3): 830–845. Bibcode:1995EcoAp...5..830M. doi:10.2307/1941991. JSTOR 1941991.
- Mitsch, W.J. (1993). "Ecological engineering—a cooperative role with the planetary life–support systems". Environmental Science & Technology. 27 (3): 438–445. Bibcode:1993EnST...27..438M. doi:10.1021/es00040a600.
- Mitsch, W.J.; Rust, W.G. (1984). "Tree growth responses to flooding in a bottomland forest in northeastern Illinois". Forest Science. 30: 499–510.
- Mitsch, W.J.; Dorge, C.L.; Wiemhoff, J.W. (1979). "Ecosystem dynamics and a phosphorus budget of an alluvial cypress swamp in southern Illinois". Ecology. 60 (6): 1116–1124. Bibcode:1979Ecol...60.1116M. doi:10.2307/1936959. JSTOR 1936959.
- Nahlik, A.M.; Mitsch, W.J. (2011). "Methane emissions from tropical freshwater wetlands located in different climatic zones of Costa Rica". Global Change Biology. 17 (3): 1321–1334. Bibcode:2011GCBio..17.1321N. doi:10.1111/j.1365-2486.2010.02190.x. S2CID 83834737.
- Villa, J.A.; Mitsch, W.J. (2015). "Carbon sequestration in different wetland plant communities in Southwest Florida". International Journal for Biodiversity Science, Ecosystems Services and Management. 11: 17–28. doi:10.1080/21513732.2014.973909.
