= Lutgarde Raskin =

Belgian-American scientist and professor

- Citizenship: American
- Education: Katholieke Universiteit Leuven; University of Illinois
- Known for: environmental biotechnology
- Awards: Busch Award, WERF; Huber Prize, ASCE; Frontier Research Award, AEESP; ISME/IWA Biocluster Award
- Scientific career
- Fields: Environmental Engineering
- Workplaces: University of Illinois; University of Michigan
- Academic advisors: Bruce Rittmann; David Stahl (biologist)
- Notable students: Daniel Oerther
- Website: cee.engin.umich.edu/Lutgarde_Raskin

Lutgarde Raskin is a Belgian-American scientist and Professor of Environmental Engineering. She is best known for her studies of microbial ecology in engineered water systems for sewage treatment and drinking water production.

Raskin earned her B.S. and M.S. in engineering and her B.S. in economics from Katholieke Universiteit Leuven. In 1993, she completed her Ph.D. at the University of Illinois. From 1993-2005, she was a member of the faculty of the University of Illinois. From 2005-2026, Raskin was a member of the faculty of the University of Michigan where she held the Altarum Institute/ERIM Russell O’Neal Endowed Professorship, and she was the Vernon L. Snoeyink Distinguished University Professor of Environmental Engineering. In 2026, she moved to the Chemical and Environmental Engineering program at Yale.

Raskin is a Fellow of the American Academy of Microbiology (AAM) and the Water Environment Federation (WEF). In 2006, she won the Walter L. Huber Civil Engineering Research Prize from the American Society of Civil Engineers, in 2007, she won the Frontier Award in Research from the Association of Environmental Engineering and Science Professors, and in 2016, she won the ISME/IWA Biocluster Award. In 2021, Raskin was elected a member of the National Academy of Engineering for, "application of genetic tools to improve anaerobic biological water treatment."

Raskin has advocated for changes in the operation of drinking water treatment facilities to encourage the growth of potentially beneficial microorganisms. In the wake of the Flint water crisis, she responded to allegations by Marc Edwards that researchers at the University of Michigan declined to collaborate on joint research of the problem.
