= Linda Zou =

Dr. Linda Zou is a professor of Victoria University, Melbourne, Australia. Professor Linda Zou's research include to develop more efficient novel water purification and desalination technologies, such as nanocomposite membranes, capacitive deionization electrodes, and membrane fouling minimization, where nanostructured materials are designed and fabricated, the technology can be used to remove micropolluants such as pharmaceutical compounds, forever chemicals, heavy metals and fine oil droplets from wastewater to safeguard public health and recover the valuable resources and to support today's circular economy. She invented the “ground-breaking” novel cloud seeding materials during the awarded research project by the 1st Cycle and 6th Cycle UAE Research Program on Rain Enhancement Science. Before returning to Australia in 2025, Professor Zou led 2D nanomaterials of membranes and hydrogels for water purification projects.

The technique developed by Prof. Zou was used in the on-going Cloud Seeding experiments in the UAE and other places.

She was previously a Professor of Civil and Environmental Engineering at the Khalifa University of Science and Technology, United Arab Emirates.
