= Michelle L. Bell =

American environmental engineer

Academic background
- Education: BS, 1992, Massachusetts Institute of Technology; MS, 1994, Stanford University; MSE, 1999, Johns Hopkins University; MSc, 2020, University of Edinburgh; PhD, 2002, Johns Hopkins University

Academic work
- Institutions: Yale School of the Environment

Michelle L. Bell is an American environmental engineer. Since 2015, she has been the Mary E. Pinchot Professor of Environmental Health at the Yale School of the Environment. In 2020, Bell was named a member of the National Academy of Medicine for her research into understanding the critical links between the environment and public health.

== Early life and education ==
Bell earned her Bachelor of Science degree in Environmental Engineering with minor in Music from the Massachusetts Institute of Technology, a Master of Science degree in Environmental Engineering from Stanford University, a Master of Science degree in Environmental Management and Economics from Johns Hopkins University, a Master of Science degree in Philosophy from University of Edinburgh, and a PhD in Environmental Engineering from Johns Hopkins University.

== Career ==
Upon completing her PhD, Bell joined the Johns Hopkins Bloomberg School of Public Health in the Department of Epidemiology. She joined the faculty at the Yale School of the Environment as an assistant professor in 2004. In her first year, she received the Rosenblith New Investigator Award for her research project titled "Assessment of the mortality effects of particulate matter characteristics." Shortly after joining the institution, Bell also received an "Outstanding New Environmental Scientists Award" from the National Institute of Environmental Health Sciences to fund her research into the relationship between outdoor concentrations of ozone and the incidence of respiratory disease and death in exposed populations.

In May 2015, Bell was named the Mary E. Pinchot Professor of Environmental Health at the Yale School of the Environment. The following year, she established the SEARCH Center (Solutions for Energy, Air, Climate, and Health) for which she received a $10 million, five-year grant from the Environmental Protection Agency to study air pollution, energy, climate change, and human health. While serving in this role, she was named by Clarivate Analytics as one of the “Highly Cited Researchers”, indicating the top 1% of researchers worldwide by field.

As a result of her academic achievements, Bell was elected to Connecticut Academy of Science and Engineering for her "advances in our understanding of how air pollution impacts human health, how weather conditions have impacted health including mortality and hospital admissions, and how health is affected by the complex systems of urbanicity, green space and vegetation, [and] social and economic systems, as well as traditional environmental exposures." She also sat on the editorial board for the peer-reviewed journals Environmental Research Letters and Epidemiology and became an associate editor of Air Quality, Atmosphere and Health. In 2020, Bell was elected to the National Academy of Medicine for her research into understanding the critical links between the environment and public health.
