= Mia Krisna Pratiwi =

Indonesian industrial engineer and environmentalist

- Born: 19 June 1996 (age 29); Bali, Indonesia
- Occupations: Industrial engineer; environmentalist

Mia Krisna Pratiwi (born 19 June 1996) is an Indonesian environmental engineer and environmentalist. In 2021, she was listed as one of BBC's 100 Women.

Pratiwi attended the Bandung Institute of Technology and works at the Denpasar City Environmental Agency. Pratiwi developed a computer application to improve the collection, processing and recycling of urban waste on the island of Bali. It is managed through the NGO Griya Luhu and involves the local community.

In October 2021, Pratiwi was on the jury for the Sustainable Teenpreneur Competition.
