= John Richard Sheaffer =

John Richard "Jack" Sheaffer (August 28, 1931 – December 21, 2016) was an American environmental engineer. He was the creator of an environmentally sensitive reclamation and reuse waste water system, co-author of the Clean Water Act while serving as the Scientific Advisor to the Secretary of the Army, was instrumental in the design of the national flood insurance program, and the author or co-author of 10 books and more than 50 technical articles on wastewater management, irrigation, floodproofing, and fresh-water resources.

== Biography ==
Sheaffer had a long and distinguished career as a champion of reclamation and reuse, and was instrumental in the inclusion of these concepts in the landmark Clean Water Act Amendments of 1972. He served at that time as the Scientific Advisor to the Secretary of the Army. His earlier dissertation at the University of Chicago on flood proofing served as a template for national, state, and local regulations on this topic.

Jack was born on August 28, 1931, in Lancaster County, Pennsylvania, as one of seven children born to Samuel Sylvester Sheaffer an Ammy Jane. He went to high school at East Lampeter, Millersville State College (now Millersville College) and received his doctoral degree from the University of Chicago. He died on December 21, 2016, in Carol Stream, Illinois.

Sheaffer's work in the recycling of wastewater began in 1972, and since then, more than 60 Sheaffer Systems have been permitted and installed in the United States.

== Awards and recognition ==
The Department of the Army in 1972 decorated him for Exceptional Civilian Service:

“Dr. John R. Sheaffer has performed exceptional civilian service from September 1970 to August 1972. His outstanding leadership in establishing the Army in the vanguard of the Nation’s effort to control and reduce environmental degradation of our water resources has resulted in significant redirection of the Army Civil Works Program mission and objectives. He has demonstrated incomparable engineering skills and judgment as a natural resources planner in solving numerable complex technical problems related to all facets of water resources development. Dr. Sheaffer’s preeminent accomplishments during this period meet the highest traditions of public service and reflect great credit upon himself and the Department of the Army.”

In 1973, the U.S. Environmental Protection Agency chose Dr. Sheaffer’s plan for Muskegon, Michigan as its first-ever waste water project post-The Clean Water Act. President Richard Nixon recognized Sheaffer's efforts:

"The innovative system of water-borne waste disposal which you have developed for Muskegon County, Michigan, came to my attention recently. I understand that your imagination and dedication have led to the development of a new and promising approach to sewage disposal, and I want to commend you for your pioneering work in this vital field.”

President Jimmy Carter recognized his achievements in 1979 after Sheaffer built 2 other reclamation and reuse waste water treatment plants in Northglenn, Colorado and Itasca, Illinois:

“This project [Northglenn] is one that is of great interest to me. I think this might be a vista of what we will see on a broad base in the future.”

Sheaffer was a recipient of The John R. Sheaffer Award for Excellence in Floodproofing in 1993, established by The Association of State Floodplain Managers and initially awarded to John R. Sheaffer, the man whose name it bears:

“Dr. John “Jack” Sheaffer laid the groundwork for floodproofing to be a viable flood protection method, adding an important nonstructural damage reduction alternative to our inventory of floodplain management tools.”

In 1995, Dr. Sheaffer was the recipient of the Life Time Environmental Achievement Award, by the City of Wheaton, Illinois.

In 2004, Dr. Sheaffer received the Association of State Floodplain Manager’s “Goddard-White” Award for lifelong innovative contributions to the science and practice of floodplain management.

== Selected bibliography ==
=== Books ===
- With Leonard A. Stevens, Future Water: An Exciting Solution to America's Most Serious Resource Crisis. William Morrow & Company. 1983. ISBN 9780688015756.

=== Co-authored papers ===
- Sheaffer, John R.; Mullan, J. David; Hinch, Nathan B. (2002). "Encouraging Wise Use of Floodplains with Market-Based Incentives". Environment: Science and Policy for Sustainable Development. 44 (1): 32–43. Bibcode:2002ESPSD..44a..32S. doi:10.1080/00139150209605590. S2CID 153862850.
- "Cities under water: A comparative evaluation of ten cities' efforts to manage floodplain land use". Program on Environment and Behavior. Institute of Behavioral Science, University of Colorado. 1988.

== Jack Sheaffer Quotes ==
"The good Lord didn't make any new water today. The glass of water you had at breakfast is used water. It went through seven Indians, 10 settlers, and 50 buffaloes before you got it. But you like to think the good Lord made it new, just for you, today."

"Dilution is not the solution to pollution."

"Wastewater is not a liability to society but rather a resource out of place, and, if managed wisely, can be a valuable economic catalyst to any community."
