= Raymond Clark (engineer) =

British engineer

Raymond Clark OBE
- Citizenship: British
- Education: University of Manchester
- Known for: Environmental engineering
- Awards: Officer of the Most Excellent Order of the British Empire
- Scientific career
- Fields: Environmental engineering
- Workplaces: Society of Environmental Engineers

Raymond Clark (engineer) is a British engineer. He is best known for his leadership of the Society of Environmental Engineers where he was chief executive for nearly two decades.

Clark earned his BSc in engineering in 1964 from the University of Manchester and his BA in psychology in 1967. Starting in 2001, he served as the chief executive of the Society of Environmental Engineers. In 2010, Clark was elected to the Engineering Council where he represented the smaller licensed member institutions.

Clark is a Chartered Engineer, a Chartered Environmentalist, and a Fellow of the Society of Environmental Engineers. In 2005, he was recognized as an Officer of the Most Excellent Order of the British Empire. In 2014, he was recognized as an honorary fellow of the Society for the Environment.
