= Environmental biotechnology =

Biotechnology applied to the natural environment

Environmental biotechnology is biotechnology that is applied to and used to study the natural environment. Environmental biotechnology also involves the use of biological processes for environmentally responsible commercial applications. The International Society for Environmental Biotechnology defines environmental biotechnology as "the development, use and regulation of biological systems for remediation of contaminated environments (land, air, water), and for environment-friendly processes (green manufacturing technologies and sustainable development)".

Environmental biotechnology can also be described as the optimized use of biological organisms, including plants, animals, bacteria, fungi and algae, to produce renewable energy, food and nutrients within integrated systems where the by-products of one process serve as inputs for another process.

== Significance for agriculture, food security, climate change mitigation and adaptation and the MDGs ==
The IAASTD has called for the advancement of small-scale agro-ecological farming systems and technology in order to achieve food security, climate change mitigation, climate change adaptation and the realisation of the Millennium Development Goals. Environmental biotechnology contributes to agroecological practices through approaches such as zero-waste agriculture and the application of anaerobic digestion technologies, including biogas production systems.

== Significance towards industrial biotechnology ==
Consider the effluents of starch plant which has mixed up with a local water body like a lake or pond. We find huge deposits of starch which are not so easily taken up for degradation by microorganisms except for a few exemptions. Microorganisms from the polluted site are scan for genomic changes that allow them to degrade/utilize the starch better than other microbes of the same genus. The modified genes are then identified. The resultant genes are cloned into industrially significant microorganisms and are used for economically processes like in pharmaceutical industry, fermentations... etc..

Similar situations can be encountered in the case of marine oil spills which require cleanup, where microbes isolated from oil rich environments like oil wells, oil transfer pipelines...etc. have been found having the potential to degrade oil or use it as an energy source. Thus they serve as a remedy to oil spills.

Microbes isolated from pesticide-contaminated soils may capable of utilizing the pesticides as energy source and hence when mixed along with bio-fertilizers, could serve as an insurance against increased pesticide-toxicity levels in agricultural platform.

On the other hand, these newly introduced microorganisms could create an imbalance in the environment concerned. The mutual harmony in which the organisms in that particular environment existed may have to face alteration and the introduction of non-native or modified microorganisms may disrupt existing ecological balances, highlighting the importance of careful environmental risk assessment.

== Applications and Implications ==
Humans have long been manipulating genetic material through breeding and modern genetic modification for optimizing crop yield, etc.. There can also be unexpected, negative health and environmental outcomes. Environmental biotechnology is about the balance between the applications that provide for these and the implications of manipulating genetic material. Textbooks address both the applications and implications. Environmental engineering texts addressing sewage treatment and biological principles are often now considered to be environmental biotechnology texts. These generally address the applications of biotechnologies, whereas the implications of these technologies are less often addressed; usually in books concerned with potential impacts and even catastrophic events.

== See also ==
- Agricultural biotechnology
- Microbial ecology
- Molecular Biotechnology
