= List of members of the National Academy of Engineering (civil) =

This list is a subsection of the List of members of the National Academy of Engineering, which includes members and international members of the United States National Academy of Engineering, living and deceased, each affiliated with one of the academy's disciplinary sections. Members are listed under their primary section, and each entry gives the person's name, primary institution, and election year. For deceased members, the year of death is noted.

== Civil and Environmental Engineering ==
Name	Institution	Year elected
Ahmad Khalid Abdelrazaq	Rise Global LLC	2022
Norman A. Abrahamson	University of California, Berkeley	2018
Linda M. Abriola	Brown University	2003
Lilia A. Abron	PEER Consultants, P.C.	2020
Mihran S. Agbabian (died 2019)	University of Southern California	1982
Joseph A. Ahearn (died 2018)	CH2M Hill, Inc.	2010
Sergio M. Alcocer	National Autonomous University of Mexico	2017
Harl Preslar Aldrich Jr. (died 2014)	Haley & Aldrich, Inc.	1984
William D. Alexander (died 2003)	Independent Consultant	1978
Eleanor Juliana Maria Allen	Catapult for Change	2020
Pedro Jose Alvarez	Rice University	2018
Lisa Alvarez-Cohen	University of California, Berkeley	2010
Bernard Amadei	University of Colorado Boulder	2008
Alfredo H-S. Ang (died 2024)	University of California, Irvine	1976
Hiroyuki Aoyama	Aoyama Laboratory	1996
Vinton W. Bacon (died 1997)	University of Wisconsin-Milwaukee	1969
Gregory B. Baecher	University of Maryland, College Park	2006
Clyde N. Baker Jr. (died 2022)	AECOM	2004
William Frazier Baker	Skidmore Owings and Merrill, LLP	2011
Wayne S. Balta	International Business Machines Corporation	2019
Harvey O. Banks (died 1996)	Harvey O. Banks, Consulting Engineer, Inc.	1973
James L. Barnard (died 2026)	Black & Veatch, Engineers-Architects	2021
Melvin L. Baron (died 1997)	Weidlinger Associates, Inc.	1978
Ana P. Barros	University of Illinois Urbana-Champaign	2019
Jurjen A. Battjes	Delft University of Technology	2009
Robert G. Bea	University of California, Berkeley	1989
Leo R. Beard (died 2009)	The University of Texas at Austin	1975
Stephen D. Bechtel Jr. (died 2021)	Bechtel Group, Inc.	1975
Lynn S. Beedle (died 2003)	Lehigh University	1972
Glenn R. Bell	National Institute of Standards and Technology	2024
Moshe E. Ben-Akiva	Massachusetts Institute of Technology	2025
Craig H Benson	University of Wisconsin-Madison	2012
Bernard B. Berger (died 2000)	University of Massachusetts at Amherst	1979
Donald S. Berry (died 2002)	Northwestern University - Evanston	1966
Vitelmo V. Bertero (died 2016)	University of California, Berkeley	1999
Jacobo Bielak	Carnegie Mellon University	2010
David P. Billington (died 2018)	Princeton University	1986
Wilson V. Binger (died 2008)	Independent Consultant	1975
Pratim Biswas	University of Miami	2019
Guenter Bloeschl	Vienna University of Technology	2020
John A. Blume (died 2002)	Independent Consultant	1969
Alexandria B. Boehm	Stanford University	2024
Marsha Anderson Bomar	GHD, Inc.	2025
Rudolph Bonaparte	Geosyntec Consultants	2007
Lillian C. Borrone	Port Authority of New York and New Jersey	1996
Thomas P. Bostick	Bostick Global Strategies	2017
Ross William Boulanger	University of California, Davis	2017
Paul Fares Boulos	Aquanuity, Inc.	2014
Harry E. Bovay Jr. (died 2011)	Mid-South Telecommunications Company	1978
Jonathan D. Bray	University of California, Berkeley	2015
Aine M. Brazil	Thornton Tomasetti	2018
John E. Breen (died 2023)	The University of Texas at Austin	1976
Boris Bresler (died 2000)	Wiss, Janney, Elstner Associates, Inc.	1979
Norman H. Brooks	California Institute of Technology	1973
Milton Brumer (died 1999)	Independent Consultant	1969
Jack E. Buffington	University of Arkansas	1996
George Bugliarello (died 2011)	Polytechnic Institute of NYU	1987
Christopher B. Burke	Christopher B. Burke Engineering, Ltd.	2021
John Boscawen Burland	Imperial College London	2016
Ned Hamilton Burns (died 2016)	The University of Texas at Austin	2000
Paul L. Busch (died 1999)	Malcolm Pirnie, Inc.	1996
L. G. (Gary) Byrd (died 2009)	Independent Consultant	1987
J. Richard Capka	Dawson & Associates	2023
E. Dean Carlson	Carlson Associates	2001
William J. Carroll (died 2023)	Montgomery Watson Harza	1987
John J. Cassidy (died 2022)	Independent Consultant	1994
Gonzalo V. Castro	GEI Consultants, Inc.	2003
James A. Caywood III (died 2000)	DeLeuw, Cather & Company	1994
Jack E. Cermak (died 2012)	Cermak Peterka Petersen	1973
Wallace L. Chadwick (died 1996)	Southern California Edison Company	1965
Subrata K. Chakrabarti (died 2009)	Offshore Structure Analysis Inc.	2002
Adrian R. Chamberlain (died 2024)	Independent Consultant	2006
Wai-Fah Chen	University of Hawaii at Manoa	1995
Amy Elizabeth Childress	University of Southern California	2026
Wonyong Choi	Korea Institute of Energy Technology	2024
Anil K. Chopra	University of California, Berkeley	1984
John T. Christian (died 2022)	University of Massachusetts	1999
John V. Christiansen (died 2017)	Independent Consultant	1985
Blanca Elena Jimenez Cisneros	Embassy of Mexico in France	2026
Jennifer Lee Clancy	J Clancy & Associates, LLC	2026
Alfred James Clark (died 2015)	Clark Enterprises, Inc.	2005
Frederick J. Clarke (died 2002)	U.S. Department of the Army	1973
John L. Cleasby (died 2021)	Iowa State University	1983
William A. Clevenger (died 2009)	Woodward-Clyde Consultants	1990
G. Wayne Clough	Georgia Institute of Technology	1990
Ray W. Clough (died 2016)	University of California, Berkeley	1968
Edward Cohen (died 2017)	Ammann & Whitney, Consulting Engineers	1975
Jared Leigh Cohon (died 2024)	Carnegie Mellon University	2012
Joseph P. Colaco	Florida International University	1994
John P. Connolly	Anchor QEA, LLC	2010
Richard A. Conway (died 2023)	Union Carbide Corporation	1986
J. Barry Cooke (died 2005)	J. Barry Cooke, Inc.	1979
Edward J. Cording	University of Illinois Urbana-Champaign	1988
W. Gene Corley (died 2013)	CTLGroup	2000
C. Allin Cornell (died 2007)	Stanford University	1981
Ross B. Corotis	University of Colorado Boulder	2002
Fernando Vasco Costa (died 1996)	Consulmar	1989
James B. Coulter (died 2005)	Public Health Service	1988
John C. Crittenden	Georgia Institute of Technology	2002
Charles Brian Crouse	AECOM	2025
Robert H. Curtin (died 2007)	The Ralph M. Parsons Company	1986
Elio D'Appolonia (died 2015)	Independent Consultant	1977
Glen T. Daigger	One Water Solutions LLC	2003
James W. Daily (died 1991)	University of Michigan	1975
Robert A. Dalrymple	Johns Hopkins University	2006
David E. Daniel	The University of Texas at Dallas	2000
Alan G. Davenport (died 2009)	University of Western Ontario	1987
Harmer E. Davis (died 1998)	University of California, Berkeley	1967
Juan Carlos De la Llera	Pontificia Universidad Catolica de Chile	2024
Victor F. B. de Mello (died 2009)	Victor de Mello & Associates Geotechnical Engineering Consultants	1980
Robert G. Dean (died 2015)	University of Florida	1980
Thomas B. Deen	National Research Council	1998
Don U. Deere (died 2018)	No Affiliation	1967
Gregory G. Deierlein	Stanford University	2013
Armen Der Kiureghian	University of California, Berkeley	2011
Reginald DesRoches	Rice University	2020
Ricardo Dobry	Rensselaer Polytechnic Institute	2004
Robert H. Dodds Jr.	University of Illinois Urbana-Champaign	2008
Albert A. Dorman (died 2023)	AECOM	1998
Jacob H. Douma (died 2004)	Independent Consultant	1971
Charles T. Driscoll Jr.	Syracuse University	2007
James M. Duncan	Virginia Tech	1985
Carroll H. Dunn (died 2003)	Independent Consultant	1998
Jackson L. Durkee (died 2007)	Independent Consultant	1995
Lloyd A. Duscha (died 2024)	Independent Consultant	1987
Donald O. Dusenberry	Donald O. Dusenberry, Consulting Engineer	2024
David A Dzombak	Carnegie Mellon University	2008
Rex A. Elder (died 2018)	Independent Consultant	1978
Rolf Eliassen (died 1997)	Stanford University	1971
Menachem Elimelech	Rice University	2006
Bruce R. Ellingwood	Colorado State University	2001
Richard S. Engelbrecht (died 1996)	University of Illinois Urbana-Champaign	1976
Luis Esteva	National University of Mexico	2000
Ralph E. Fadum (died 2000)	North Carolina State University	1975
Peter Fajfar	University of Ljubljana	2018
Michael N. Fardis	University of Patras	2026
Eugene J. Fasullo (died 2020)	Port Authority of New York and New Jersey	1994
Gregory L. Fenves	Emory University	2014
Steven J. Fenves (died 2025)	Carnegie Mellon University	1976
Nuria I. Fernandez	Federal Transit Administration	2022
Eugene C. Figg Jr. (died 2002)	Figg Engineering Group	2001
Fred N. Finn (died 2023)	Independent Consultant	1993
Ulrich Finsterwalder (died 1988)	Independent Consultant	1976
Anthony E. Fiorato	Independent Consultant	2008
John W. Fisher	Lehigh University	1986
John A. Focht Jr. (died 2010)	McClelland Engineers, Inc.	1986
John W. Fondahl (died 2008)	Stanford University	1993
Davis L. Ford (died 2023)	Davis L. Ford & Associates	1997
David W. Fowler	The University of Texas at Austin	1998
George A. Fox (died 2001)	Grow Tunneling Corporation	1988
Gerard F. Fox (died 2008)	Independent Consultant	1976
Francis B. Francois (died 2021)	American Association of State Highway & Transportation Officials	1999
Dan M. Frangopol	Lehigh University	2025
Paul L. Freedman	LimnoTech	2020
Catherine E. Wolfgram French	University of Minnesota, Minneapolis	2024
David Alan Friedman	Forell/Elsesser Engineers Inc.	2023
E. Montford Fucik (died 2010)	Harza Engineering Company	1974
Theodore V. Galambos	University of Minnesota, Minneapolis	1979
Richard H. Gallagher (died 1997)	Clarkson University	1983
Gerald E. Galloway Jr.	University of Maryland, College Park	2004
Edgar J. Garbarini (died 2000)	Bechtel Group, Inc.	1980
Nicholas J. Garber	University of Central Florida	2004
Luis Enrique Garcia	Universidad de Los Andes	2021
Marcelo Horacio García	University of Illinois Urbana-Champaign	2025
Ben C. Gerwick Jr. (died 2006)	Ben C. Gerwick, Inc.	1973
Jerome B. Gilbert (died 2025)	Independent Consultant	1989
Paul H. Gilbert (died 2021)	Parsons Brinckerhoff Inc.	1997
Robert B. Gilbert	The University of Texas at Austin	2020
Jean-Pierre Giroud	JP GIROUD, INC.	2009
Earnest F. Gloyna (died 2019)	The University of Texas at Austin	1970
W. David Goodyear	Independent Consultant	2013
James P. Gould (died 1998)	Mueser Rutledge Consulting Engineers	1988
Lawrence G. Griffis	Florida International University	2003
H. Polat Gülkan	Baskent University	2023
Charles N. Haas	Drexel University	2021
Ashraf Habibullah	Computers & Structures, Inc	2024
Jerome F. Hajjar	Northeastern University	2022
William J. Hall (died 2020)	University of Illinois Urbana-Champaign	1968
Masanori Hamada	Waseda University	2025
Ronald Owen Hamburger	Simpson Gumpertz & Heger, Inc.	2015
David G. Hammond (died 2002)	Independent Consultant	1981
Delon Hampton (died 2021)	Delon Hampton & Associates, Chartered	1992
Paul D. Haney (died 1990)	Black & Veatch, Engineers-Architects	1974
William H. Hansmire	WSP USA	2002
John M. Hanson (died 2017)	Independent Consultant	1992
Robert D. Hanson	University of Michigan	1984
Jiming Hao	Tsinghua University	2018
Donald R. F. Harleman (died 2005)	Massachusetts Institute of Technology	1974
Milton E. Harr (died 2024)	Purdue University	1997
James R. Harris	J.R. Harris & Company	2005
William J. Harris Jr. (died 2012)	Independent Consultant	1977
Youssef M. Hashash	University of Illinois Urbana-Champaign	2022
Henry J. Hatch	U.S. Department of the Army	1992
Elizabeth A. Hausler	Build Change	2025
Elvin R. (Vald) Heiberg III (died 2013)	Heiberg Associates	1995
Chris T. Hendrickson	Carnegie Mellon University	2011
Alfred J. Hendron Jr.	Independent Consultant	1983
Janet G. Hering	Swiss Federal Institute of Aquatic Science & Technology (Eawag)	2015
Clair A. Hill (died 1998)	CH2M Hill, Inc.	1992
Gerald D. Hines (died 2020)	Hines	2001
Lester A. Hoel (died 2022)	University of Virginia	1989
Michael R. Hoffmann	California Institute of Technology	2011
Eivind Hognestad (died 2000)	CTLGroup	1973
Mark D. Hollis (died 1998)	Public Health Service	1967
William Thomas Holmes	Rutherford + Chekene	2017
John D. Hooper	Magnusson Klemencic Associates, Inc.	2022
Arpad Horvath	University of California, Berkeley	2024
George W. Housner (died 2008)	California Institute of Technology	1965
Kaare Høeg	Norwegian Geotechnical Institute	1993
Izzat M. Idriss	University of California, Davis	1989
Peter A. Irwin (died 2025)	Rowan Williams Davies & Irwin Inc. (RWDI)	2022
Donald G. Iselin (died 2012)	U.S. Department of the Navy	1980
Jeremy Isenberg	Stanford University	1999
Kenji Ishihara (died 2025)	Chuo University	2010
Kenneth J. Ives (died 2009)	University College London	2003
Wilfred D. Iwan (died 2020)	California Institute of Technology	1999
Srinivasa H. Iyengar (died 2019)	Skidmore, Owings & Merrill LLP	2000
Joseph G. Jacangelo	Stantec	2025
J. Donovan Jacobs (died 2000)	Jacobs Associates	1969
Sudhir K. Jain	Indian Institute of Technology - Gandhinagar	2021
Michele Jamiolkowski (died 2023)	Technical University of Torino	2005
Robert B. Jansen (died 2011)	Independent Consultant	1986
David Jenkins (died 2021)	University of California, Berkeley	2001
Paul C. Jennings	California Institute of Technology	1977
Guibin Jiang	Research Center for Eco-Environmental Sciences, Chinese Academy of Sciences	2026
James O. Jirsa	The University of Texas at Austin	1988
Charles C. Johnson Jr. (died 2004)	Public Health Service	1990
Joe W. Johnson (died 2002)	University of California, Berkeley	1976
Michael R. Johnson	University of Arkansas	2010
Roy G. Johnston (died 2008)	Brandow & Johnston Associates, Consulting Structural Engineers	1981
Adib Kanafani	University of California, Berkeley	2002
Ahsan Kareem	University of Notre Dame	2009
Michael C. Kavanaugh	Geosyntec Consultants	1998
Edward Kavazanjian Jr.	Arizona State University	2013
David N. Kennedy (died 2007)	State of California	1998
Robert P. Kennedy (died 2018)	RPK Structural Mechanics Consulting	1991
Theodore C. Kennedy (died 2012)	BE&K, Inc.	1999
Clyde E. Kesler (died 2011)	University of Illinois Urbana-Champaign	1977
Milo S. Ketchum (died 1999)	University of Connecticut	1982
Christine Mary Keville	Keville Enterprises, Inc.	2023
Jon Edward Khachaturian	Versabar, Inc.	2010
George H. Kimmons (died 2004)	Tennessee Valley Authority	1980
Charles A. Kircher	Kircher & Associates	2019
Anne Setian Kiremidjian	Florida International University	2021
Gary J. Klein	Wiss, Janney, Elstner Associates, Inc.	2016
Ron Klemencic	Magnusson Klemencic Associates, Inc.	2020
Robert M. Koerner (died 2019)	Drexel University	1998
John H. Koon	John H. Koon & Associates	2019
Demetrious Koutsoftas	DKGC, Inc.	2006
Steven L. Kramer	University of Washington	2020
Helmut Krawinkler (died 2012)	Stanford University	2012
Jai Krishna (died 1999)	Independent Consultant	1979
Raymond J. Krizek	Northwestern University - Evanston	2001
Ray B. Krone (died 2000)	University of California, Davis	1995
Thomas R. Kuesel (died 2010)	Independent Consultant	1977
John M. Kulicki	Modjeski and Masters, Inc.	2006
Suzanne Lacasse	Norwegian Geotechnical Institute	2001
Roger Lacroix (died 2017)	Independent Consultant	1990
Charles C. Ladd (died 2014)	Massachusetts Institute of Technology	1983
T. William Lambe (died 2017)	Independent Consultant	1972
James L. Lammie (died 2022)	Parsons Brinckerhoff Inc.	1993
Martin Lang (died 2000)	Independent Consultant	1980
Thomas D. Larson (died 2006)	Independent Consultant	1985
George D. Leal	Dames & Moore Group	1995
Mark W. LeChevallier	Dr. Water Consulting, LLC	2023
James O. Leckie	Stanford University	2005
Griff C. Lee (died 2018)	Griff C. Lee, Inc.	1980
Robert F. Legget (died 1994)	National Research Council of Canada	1988
Maria C. Lehman	GHD	2025
William J. LeMessurier (died 2007)	LeMessurier Consultants Inc.	1978
John W. Leonard (died 2019)	Washington Group Int'l	1984
Gerald A. Leonards (died 1997)	Purdue University	1988
William E. Leonhard (died 2008)	The Parsons Corporation	1982
Fritz Leonhardt (died 1999)	Independent Consultant	1983
Thomas M. Leps (died 2010)	Thomas M. Leps	1973
Eva Lerner-Lam	Palisades Consulting Group, Inc.	2023
Carroll N. LeTellier (died 2019)	Jacobs/Sverdrup Engineering	2003
George Evangelos Leventis	Langan International/Langan Engineering	2026
Herbert S. Levinson (died 2017)	Independent Consultant	1994
Matthys P. Levy	Weidlinger Associates, Inc.	1996
T. Y. Lin (died 2003)	Lin Tung-Yen China	1967
Yu-Kweng M. Lin (died 2024)	Florida Atlantic University	2000
Joseph T. Ling (died 2006)	Minnesota Mining & Manufacturing Company	1976
Philip Li-Fan Liu	National University of Singapore	2015
Bret Lizundia	Rutherford + Chekene	2024
Raymond C. Loehr (died 2021)	The University of Texas at Austin	1983
Bruce Ernest Logan	The Pennsylvania State University - University Park	2013
John A. Logan (died 1987)	Rose-Hulman Institute of Technology	1968
Bindu N. Lohani	Asian Development Bank	2003
Michael K. Loose	U.S. Navy	2024
Daniel P. Loucks	Cornell University	1989
John Lowe III (died 2012)	Independent Consultant	1974
Harvey F. Ludwig (died 2010)	Independent Consultant	1969
Cecil Lue-Hing (died 2026)	Cecil Lue-Hing & Associates Inc.	2000
Jay R. Lund	University of California, Davis	2018
Louis Carl Lundstrom (died 2015)	General Motors Corporation	1977
Richard G. Luthy (died 2025)	Stanford University	1999
Inge Martin Lyse (died 1990)	Norwegian Institute of Technology	1981
Thomas S. Maddock (died 2018)	No Affiliation	1993
Jon D. Magnusson	Magnusson Klemencic Associates, Inc.	2016
Hani S. Mahmassani (died 2025)	Northwestern University - Evanston	2021
David R. Maidment	The University of Texas at Austin	2016
Robert Mair	University of Cambridge	2019
James O. Malley	Degenkolb Engineers	2021
Herbert A. Mang	Vienna University of Technology	2004
Fred Mannering	University of South Florida	2026
Yi-Sheng T. E. Mao (died 1989)	China Association for Science and Technology	1982
William F. Marcuson III	U.S. Army Corps of Engineers	1996
Robert C. Marini (died 2026)	Camp Dresser & McKee Inc.	1991
Linsey C. Marr	Virginia Polytechnic Institute and State University	2023
W. Allen Marr Jr.	Principal, Marr GeoStructural Engineers, P.C	2008
Albert R. Marschall (died 2008)	U.S. Department of the Navy	1990
Charles E. Massonnet (died 1996)	University of Liege	1978
Robert F. Mast (died 2020)	BERGER/ABAM Engineers Inc.	1989
Bryant Mather (died 2002)	U.S. Army Corps of Engineers	1992
Albert A. Mathews (died 2007)	Al Mathews Corporation	1992
Hudson Matlock (died 2015)	The University of Texas at Austin	1982
Fujio Matsuda (died 2020)	University of Hawaii System	1974
Adolf D. May (died 2023)	University of California, Berkeley	1990
Perry L. McCarty (died 2023)	Stanford University	1977
Bramlette McClelland (died 2010)	McClelland Engineers, Inc.	1979
Michael J. McGuire	Michael J. McGuire, Inc.	2009
Robin K. McGuire	Private Consultant	2007
William McGuire (died 2013)	Cornell University	1994
Ross E. McKinney (died 2021)	University of Kansas	1977
John S. McNown (died 1998)	University of Kansas	1987
Gertjan Medema	KWR Water Research Institute	2026
Bernard Le Mehaute (died 1997)	University of Miami	1991
Kishor C. Mehta	Texas Tech University	2004
Lelio H. Mejia	Geosyntec Consultants	2020
Dwight F. Metzler (died 2001)	Kansas Department of Health and Environment	1973
Harold L. Michael (died 1999)	Purdue University	1975
Henry L. Michel (died 2001)	Parsons Brinckerhoff Inc.	1995
Duane K. Miller	Lincoln Electric Company	2024
James K. Mitchell (died 2023)	Virginia Polytechnic Institute and State University	1976
Johannes Moe (died 2023)	SINTEF	1977
Jack P. Moehle	University of California, Berkeley	2014
Dade W. Moeller (died 2011)	Dade Moeller & Associates, Inc.	1978
Patricia Lyon Mokhtarian	Georgia Institute of Technology	2024
Carl L. Monismith (died 2025)	University of California, Berkeley	1980
Stephen G. Monismith	Stanford University	2022
James E. Monsees (died 2019)	Parsons Brinckerhoff Inc.	1991
Paulo J.M. Monteiro	University of California, Berkeley	2020
Benjamin F. Montoya (died 2015)	U.S. Department of the Navy	2001
Walter P. Moore Jr. (died 1998)	Texas A&M University-College Station	1991
William W. Moore (died 2002)	Dames & Moore Group	1978
Douglas C. Moorhouse (died 2012)	Woodward-Clyde Group, Inc.	1982
Charles W. Moorman	AMTRAK	2016
James J. Morgan (died 2020)	California Institute of Technology	1978
Norbert R. Morgenstern	University of Alberta	1992
John W. Morris (died 2013)	J.W. Morris Ltd.	1979
Thomas M. Murray (died 2024)	Virginia Polytechnic Institute and State University	2002
Kiyoshi Muto (died 1989)	Muto and Associates, Ltd.	1978
Norman A. Nadel (died 2019)	Nadel Associates, Inc.	1983
Farzad Naeim	Farzad Naeim, Inc.	2022
R. Shankar Nair	EXP US Services Inc.	2005
Masayoshi Nakashima	Kobori Research Complex	2015
David J. Nash	Dave Nash & Associates International, LLC	2007
David Arthur Nethercot	Imperial College London	2015
Deb A. Niemeier	University of Maryland, College Park	2017
Charles C. Noble (died 2003)	The C.T. Main Corporation	1981
Daniel A. Nolasco	Nolasco & Associates	2024
Guy Jérôme Pierre Nordenson	Princeton University	2022
James J. O'Brien (died 2020)	James J. O'Brien, P.E.	2012
Donald J. O'Connor (died 1997)	HydroQual, Inc.	1978
Charles R. O'Melia (died 2010)	Johns Hopkins University	1989
Robert S. O'Neil (died 2021)	O'Neil and Associates	2001
Thomas D. O'Rourke	Cornell University	1993
Daniel A. Okun (died 2007)	The University of North Carolina at Chapel Hill	1973
Roy E. Olson (died 2024)	The University of Texas at Austin	2003
Henry J. Ongerth (died 2011)	California Department of Health Services	1976
Gerald T. Orlob (died 2013)	University of California, Davis	1992
Carlos S. Ospina (died 2013)	INGETEC S.A.	1977
Jorj O. Osterberg (died 2008)	Northwestern University - Evanston	1975
Douglas M. Owen	Stantec	2023
Charles J. Pankow (died 2004)	Charles Pankow Builders	1997
James F. Pankow	Portland State University	2009
Denny S. Parker	Retired-Other	2004
Angus Paton (died 1999)	Sir Alexander Gibb & Partners	1979
Seth L. Pearlman	Menard - North America	2024
Ralph B. Peck (died 2008)	Independent Consultant	1965
Eugene J. Peltier (died 2004)	U.S. Department of the Navy	1979
Celestino R. Pennoni	Pennoni Associates Inc. Consulting Engineers	2000
Joseph Penzien (died 2011)	University of California, Berkeley	1977
Craig E. Philip	Vanderbilt University	2014
Maryann T. Phipps	Estructure, Inc.	2022
Nelson L. de Sousa Pinto (died 2025)	Independent Consultant	1995
Roberto Meli Piralla	National Autonomous University of Mexico	2020
Karl S. Pister (died 2022)	University of California, Berkeley	1980
Frederick G. Pohland (died 2004)	University of Pittsburgh	1993
James W. Poirot (died 2011)	CH2M Hill, Inc.	1993
Chris D. Poland	Chris D Poland Consulting Engineer	2009
Egor P. Popov (died 2001)	University of California, Berkeley	1976
Randall W. Poston	Pivot Engineers	2017
Harry George Poulos	Tetra Tech, Inc.	2014
Ronald W. Pulling (died 2010)	Ronald W. Pulling, Associates	1986
Jiuhui Qu	Chinese Academy of Sciences	2019
Fredric Raichlen (died 2014)	California Institute of Technology	1993
Ekkehard Ramm	University of Stuttgart	2008
Lutgarde M. Raskin	University of Michigan	2021
Ellen Rathje	University of Texas	2025
Lymon C. Reese (died 2009)	The University of Texas at Austin	1975
Kenneth F. Reinschmidt (died 2018)	Texas A&M University-College Station	1991
Frank E. Richart Jr. (died 1994)	University of Michigan	1969
Louis W. Riggs (died 2002)	Tudor Engineering Company	1987
Bruce E. Rittmann	Arizona State University	2004
Gustavo Rivas-Mijares (died 2014)	Central University of Venezuela	1981
Milo E. Riverso	Manhattan University	2026
Richard J. Robbins (died 2019)	The Robbins Group LLC	1991
James E. Roberts (died 2006)	Imbsen & Associates, Inc.	1996
Paul V. Roberts (died 2006)	Stanford University	1997
Leslie E. Robertson (died 2021)	Leslie Earl Robertson, Structural Engineer, LLC	1975
Thomas B. Robinson (died 2006)	Black & Veatch, Engineers-Architects	1979
Larry A. Roesner	Colorado State University	1990
Jose M. Roesset	Texas A&M University-College Station	1993
Stanley T. Rolfe (died 2023)	University of Kansas	1982
Joan B. Rose	Michigan State University	2011
Emilio Rosenblueth (died 1994)	Universidad Nacional Autonoma de Mexico	1977
Herbert B. Rothman (died 2015)	Weidlinger Associates, Inc.	1990
Hunter Rouse (died 1996)	The University of Iowa	1966
Michael J. Rouse	Michael J. Rouse Consulting	2011
R. Kerry Rowe	Queen's University	2016
Roy E. Rowe (died 2008)	Independent Consultant	1980
Jerome L. Sackman (died 2016)	University of California, Berkeley	1992
Mario G. Salvadori (died 1997)	Weidlinger Associates, Inc.	1983
Reuben Samuels (died 2004)	Parsons Brinckerhoff Inc.	1994
Gurmukh S. Sarkaria (died 2014)	Independent Consultant	1981
Mark Peter Sarkisian	Skidmore Owings and Merrill, LLP	2021
Thorndike Saville Jr. (died 2014)	Independent Consultant	1977
Robert H. Scanlan (died 2001)	Johns Hopkins University	1987
Thomas Zarro Scarangello	Thornton Tomasetti	2026
Drs. Jorg Schlaich (died 2021)	Independent Consultant	1994
John H. Schmertmann	University of Florida	1984
Jerald L. Schnoor	The University of Iowa	1999
Henry G. Schwartz Jr.	Independent Consultant	1997
Alexander C. Scordelis (died 2007)	University of California, Berkeley	1978
Ronald F. Scott (died 2005)	California Institute of Technology	1974
David L. Sedlak	University of California, Berkeley	2016
SawTeen See	See Robertson Structural Engineers, LLC	2025
Frieder Seible	University of California, San Diego	1999
Dominick M. Servedio	STV Group	2017
Eugene Sevin (died 2023)	Independent Consultant	1985
Surendra P. Shah	The University of Texas at Arlington	2006
Essam Abdel Aziz Sharaf	Cairo University	2020
Hsieh W. Shen (died 2021)	University of California, Berkeley	1993
Masanobu Shinozuka (died 2018)	University of California, Irvine	1978
Christine A. Shoemaker	Cornell University	2012
Leslie L. Shoemaker	Tetra Tech, Inc.	2022
Chester P. Siess (died 2004)	University of Illinois Urbana-Champaign	1967
Philip C. Singer (died 2020)	The University of North Carolina at Chapel Hill	1995
Vijay P. Singh	Texas A&M University	2022
Kumares C. Sinha	Purdue University	2008
Alec W. Skempton (died 2001)	Imperial College London	1976
John B. Skilling (died 1998)	Skilling Ward Magnusson Barkshire Inc.	1965
Sarah Slaughter	Built Environment Coalition	2017
Robert Smilowitz	Thornton Tomasetti	2025
Jane McKee Smith	University of Florida	2019
Wilbur S. Smith (died 1990)	Wilbur S. Smith Management	1968
Vernon L. Snoeyink	University of Illinois Urbana-Champaign	1998
Franklin F. Snyder (died 2008)	Independent Consultant	1985
Kenichi Soga	University of California, Berkeley	2023
George F. Sowers (died 1996)	Law Companies Group, Inc.	1994
Mete A. Sozen (died 2018)	Purdue University	1977
Daniel Sperling	University of California, Davis	2022
David A. Stahl	University of Washington	2012
James F. Stahl	JFS Environmental Engineering	2007
Jery Russell Stedinger	Cornell University	2014
Dean E. Stephan (died 2025)	Charles Pankow Builders	2000
Eli Sternberg (died 1988)	California Institute of Technology	1975
Jonathan P. Stewart	University of California, Los Angeles	2024
Kenneth E. Stinson	Peter Kiewit Sons', Inc.	2007
Kenneth H. Stokoe II	The University of Texas at Austin	1997
Robert L. Street	Stanford University	2004
Werner Stumm (died 1999)	ETH Zurich	1991
Rao Y. Surampalli	Global Institute for Energy, Environment and Sustainability	2026
William F. Swiger (died 1996)	Independent Consultant	1980
James M. Symons	University of Houston	1994
Costas Emmanuel Synolakis	University of Southern California	2023
George J. Tamaro	Mueser Rutledge Consulting Engineers	1995
Man-Chung Tang	T.Y. Lin International	1995
Daniel Tassin	International Bridge Technologies	2018
Robert L. Taylor	University of California, Berkeley	1991
George Tchobanoglous	University of California, Davis	2004
Robert V. Thomann (died 2026)	Manhattan College	1999
Harold A. Thomas Jr. (died 2002)	Harvard University	1976
Charles H. Thornton (died 2023)	Charles H. Thornton & Company, LLC	1997
William A. Thornton	Cives Engineering Corporation	2013
Bruno Thurlimann (died 2008)	ETH Zurich	1978
Richard L. Tomasetti	Thornton Tomasetti	2004
Dominic M. Di Toro	University of Delaware	2005
R. Rhodes Trussell	Trussell Technologies, Inc.	1995
Keh-Chyuan Tsai	National Taiwan University	2022
Richard L. Tucker	The University of Texas at Austin	1996
Bernard A. Vallerga (died 2013)	Independent Consultant	1987
Mark C.M. van Loosdrecht	Delft University of Technology	2015
Vito A. Vanoni (died 1999)	California Institute of Technology	1977
Anestis S. Veletsos (died 2018)	University of Houston	1979
Jan A. Veltrop (died 2007)	Independent Consultant	1998
Peter J. Vickery	Applied Research Associates, Inc.	2024
Ivan M. Viest (died 2012)	IMV Consulting	1978
Michel Virlogeux	Michel Virlogeux Consultant SARL	2023
Alan M. Voorhees (died 2005)	Summit Enterprises, Inc.	2000
Mark Waggoner	Walter P. Moore & Associates, Inc.	2026
T. David Waite	University of New South Wales	2018
Leland J. Walker (died 2014)	Northern Engineering and Testing, Inc.	1984
Cindy L. Wallis-Lage	Black & Veatch, Engineers-Architects	2021
Mason Torrey Walters	Forell/Elsesser Engineers Inc.	2026
C. Michael Walton	The University of Texas at Austin	1993
Walter J. Weber Jr. (died 2018)	University of Michigan	1985
Paul Weidlinger (died 1999)	Weidlinger Associates, Inc.	1982
Edward Wenk Jr. (died 2012)	University of Washington	1969
G. O. Wessenauer (died 1990)	Independent Consultant	1968
Garret P. Westerhoff	Malcolm Pirnie, Inc.	2000
Paul K. Westerhoff	Arizona State University	2023
Richard N. White (died 2009)	Cornell University	1992
Robert V. Whitman (died 2012)	Massachusetts Institute of Technology	1975
Andrew Stuart Whittaker	University at Buffalo	2026
Andrew J. Whittle	Massachusetts Institute of Technology	2010
Leonardo Zeevaert Wiechers (died 2010)	Universidad Nacional Autonoma de Mexico	1978
Robert L. Wiegel (died 2016)	University of California, Berkeley	1975
Mark Robert Wiesner	Duke University	2015
Jim D. Wiethorn	ICC Forensics	2025
Lyman D. Wilbur (died 2001)	Morrison-Knudsen Company, Inc.	1967
Kaspar J. Willam (died 2024)	University of Houston	2004
Edward L. Wilson	University of California, Berkeley	1985
Sharon L. Wood	The University of Texas at Austin	2013
Richard D. Woods (died 2021)	University of Michigan	2003
Richard N. Wright (died 2019)	National Institute of Standards and Technology	2003
Loring A. Wyllie Jr.	Degenkolb Engineers	1990
Michael Yachnis (died 2012)	The George Washington University	1985
Alfred A. Yee (died 2017)	Yee Precast Design Group Ltd.	1976
William W-G. Yeh	University of California, Los Angeles	2008
T. Leslie Youd	Brigham Young University	2005
Joseph A. Yura	The University of Texas at Austin	2000
Wanming Zhai	Southwest Jiaotong University	2021
Paul Zia (died 2023)	North Carolina State University	1983
Olgierd C. Zienkiewicz (died 2009)	University of Wales Aberystwyth	1981
