= Alfred Noble Prize =

Civil Engineering Award

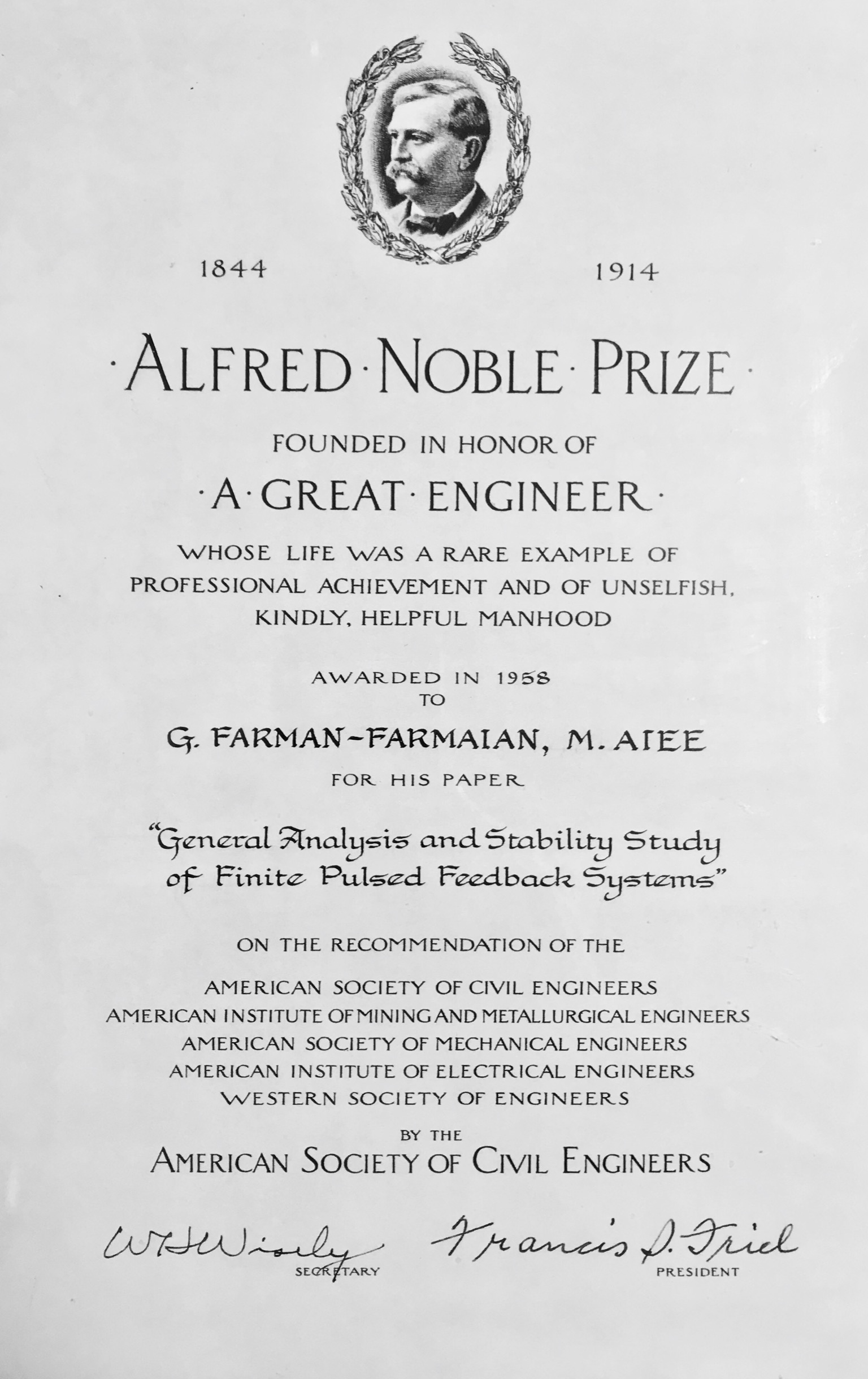
The 1958 Alfred Noble Prize : G. Farman-Farmaian and M. Aiee.

The Alfred Noble Prize is an award presented by the American Society of Civil Engineers, as the trustee of prize funds contributed by the combined engineering societies of the United States. It is awarded annually to a person not over the age of thirty-five for a technical paper of exceptional merit published in one of the journals of the participating societies.

Established in 1929 in honor of Alfred Noble (1844–1914), past president of the American Society of Civil Engineers, the prize was first awarded in 1931. There have been several notable winners of this prize, including Claude E. Shannon in 1939.

The prize has no connection to the Nobel Prize established by Alfred Nobel, with which it is often confused owing to the similarity of their names.

== Recipients ==
Source: ASCE
Year	Names
1931	C. T. Eddy
1932	Frank M. Starr
1933	C. Maxwell Stanley
1936	Abe Tilles
1937	G. M. L. Sommerman
1938	E. C. Huge (Honorable Mention)
1938	Ralph J. Schilthuis
1939	Claude E. Shannon
1941	Robert Fred Hays, Jr.
1942	George Wesley Dunlap
1943	Benjamin J. Lazan
1944	Walter R. Wilson
1945	August L. Ahlf
1946	Martin Goland
1947	John H. Hollomon
1948	Robert L. Hoss
1949	John C. Fisher
1950	Ralph J. Kochenburger
1951	Eldo C. Koenig
1952	Myron Tribus
1953	Henry M. Paynter, Jr.
1954	Cornelius Sheldon Roberts
1955	Richard Louis Bright
1956	Mohamed Mortada
1957	Ray D. Bowerman
1958	Ghaffar Farman-Farmaian, M. Aiee
1959	Paul Shewmon
1960	Ronald T. Mclaughlin, Jr.
1961	George S. Reichenbach
1962	Richard J. Wasley
1963	Alan Garnett Davenport
1964	Burton J. Mcmurtry
1965	Stephen E. Harris
1966	Bobby O. Hardin
1967	Frederick J. Moody
1968	Richard Holland
1969	Ronald Gibala
1970	Peter W. Marshall
1971	Ben G. Burke
1972	Christopher L. Magee
1973	Dieter D. Pfaffinger
1974	Viney Kumar Gupta
1975	William L. Smith
1976	S. N. Singh
1977	John E. Killough
1978	Maria Comminou
1979	Alan S. Willsky
1980	Clyde L. Briant
1981	Bharat Bhushan
1982	George Gazetas
1984	William R. Brownlie
1986	David L. Mcdowell
1987	Keith D. Hjelmstad
1988	Filip C. Filippou
1989	Ian D. Moore
1990	Fariborz Barzegar-Jamshidi
1991	Kwai S. Chan
1993	Sharon L. Wood
1994	G. Scott Crowther
1995	Maria Q. Feng
1997	Hermann F. Spoerker
1998	Laura B. Parsons
2000	Evan Jannoulakis
2002	Kevin W. Cassel
2005	Christopher R. Clarkson
2006	Jeffrey S. Kroner
2007	Cynthia L. Dinwiddie
2008	Steven R. Meer, Craig H. Benson
2009	Ghim Ping Ong, Tien F. Fwa
2011	Raffaella Paparcone, Markus J. Buehler
2012	Marios Panagiotou, Jose I. Restrepo
2013	Shivam Tripathi, Rao S. Govindaraju
2014	Pallava Kaushik, Hongbin Yin
2015	Mohamed Soliman, Dan M. Frangopol
2016	Teng Wu, Ahsan Kareem
2017	Kristina Stephan, Carol C. Menassa
2019	Gholamreza Amirinia, Sungmoon Jung
2020	Mustafa Mashal, Alessandro Palermo
2021	Zhichao Lai, Amit H. Varma
2022	Zhihao Kong, Na Lu
2023	Jiannan Cai, Hubo Cai
2024	Xu Han, Dan M. Frangopol

== See also ==
- List of engineering awards
- List of awards named after people
