= Jocelyn Hayley =

Canadian civil engineer

Jocelyn L. Hayley (also published as Jocelyn L. H. Grozic) is a Canadian civil engineer whose research focuses on the interconnections between climate change, permafrost, gas hydrates, and submarine landslides. She is a professor of civil engineering at the University of Calgary, a former department head, and a former associate dean of research in Calgary's Schulich School of Engineering.

== Education and career ==
Hayley's father, Don Hayley, is a geotechnical engineer, and her mother is a biologist. She grew up near Edmonton, Alberta. Hayley received a bachelor's degree in civil engineering from the University of Alberta in 1994. Continuing her graduate studies at the University of Alberta, she completed her Ph.D. in 1999, supervised by Norbert Morgenstern and Peter Robertson.

She worked for two years in industry, and was a postdoctoral researcher at the Norwegian Geotechnical Institute, working there with Suzanne Lacasse, before taking her present position at the University of Calgary in 2001. She became the first woman to become a faculty member in the Department of Civil Engineering. She was associate dean of research in Calgary's Schulich School of Engineering from 2015 to 2018, and became department head in 2018.

== Recognition ==
Hayley was named as a Fellow of the Engineering Institute of Canada in 2017, after a nomination from the Canadian Geotechnical Society. She is a 2024 Fellow of the Canadian Academy of Engineering.

Hayley was the 2001 recipient of the Leaders of Tomorrow award of Alberta's ASTech Foundation. The Association of Professional Engineers and Geoscientists of Alberta gave Hayley their 2004 Early Accomplishment Award and their 2017 Women in Engineering and Geoscience Champion Award. She was the 2023 recipient of the Canadian Pacific Railway Engineering Medal of the Engineering Institute of Canada.

She gave the R. M. Hardy Keynote Address at GeoCalgary 2022, the first woman keynote speaker in the 75-year history of the conference, and she was the Fall 2024 Cross Canada Lecturer of the Canadian Geotechnical Society.
