= Total sounding =

Geotechnical investigation method

Symbol used in drawings

Total sounding (TS) is a sounding method performed as part of geotechnical investigation. The sounding combines conventional rotary-pressure sounding with bedrock drilling, including rotation, ramming and flushing modes. The result indicates sediment stratification, occasionally soil type and may verify depth to bedrock.

== History ==
The rotary-pressure sounding method was developed by the Norwegian Geotechnical Institute (NGI) and the Public Roads Administration (NPRA) in 1967.
