= Richard G. Luthy =

American environmental engineer (1945–2025)

Richard G. Luthy (June 11, 1945 – October 6, 2025) was an American environmental engineer who was the Silas H. Palmer Professor of Civil and Environmental Engineering at Stanford University, California. His specialty was water quality engineering and the future of urban water supplies and reuse in water-stressed regions.

Luthy was elected to the National Academy of Engineering in 1999 for leadership in water quality protection and engineering.

== Career ==
Luthy was born in Buffalo, New York, in 1945. During his childhood, Luthy lived in Prairie Village, Kansas, and attended Prairie Elementary School. His family moved west to Palo Alto, California, in 1956 when he was in sixth grade. He attended the University of California, Berkeley from 1963 to 1967, majoring in chemical engineering. He received an MS from the University of Hawai'i at Mānoa in 1969 in its newly-formed program in ocean engineering.

Luthy was in the US Navy Civil Engineer Corps from 1969 to 1972 and was promoted from ensign to lieutenant. He was a qualified Navy deep sea diving and salvage officer with the Seabees with tours of duty at Port Hueneme, California, in the Naval Facilities Engineering Service Center, and at Davisville, Rhode Island, where he was assistant officer in charge of Underwater Construction Team One. Luthy was a deep submergence vehicle operator for the Naval Experimental Manned Observatory (DSV-5 Nemo). This was the first submersible with a transparent, all-acrylic spherical hull designed to oversee underwater construction and salvage work.

Luthy returned to the University of California, Berkeley on the GI Bill for graduate studies in environmental engineering on water treatment and water quality.

== Academic research ==
Luthy joined the faculty in civil and environmental engineering at Carnegie Mellon University in 1975. He was associate dean in the university's school of engineering, and department head of civil and environmental engineering. He was recruited by Stanford and returned to Palo Alto in 1999. He was chair of Stanford's Civil and Environmental Engineering Department from 2003 to 2009.

Luthy's research emphasized physicochemical processes for water quality engineering. His graduate studies and early research coincided with the passage of major water quality legislation, as well as with the energy crisis in the 1970s. This resulted in research projects supported by the United States Environmental Protection Agency, the Energy Research and Development Administration and its successor, United States Department of Energy, with studies on water management and treatment in coal gasification and liquefaction. That work led to a body of research on the behavior of polycyclic aromatic hydrocarbons in treatment and fate in the environment. Research in the 1980s and 1990s addressed soil and groundwater contamination and bioavailability of hydrophobic organic compounds and PFCs, so-called forever chemicals, for protection of groundwater. His research focused on persistent and bioaccumulative organic compounds in sediments that resulted in the development of in-situ treatment technologies to sequester toxic hydrophobic organic compounds.

Having seen California grow in population and prosper economically, he witnessed how the state's major water infrastructure that served the state well in the mid-twentieth century was stretched to its limits to meet the needs of the twenty-first century. Luthy worked with colleagues at Stanford and elsewhere on more sustainable urban water systems including reuse and stormwater capture for water supply. From 2011 to 2022 he was the director of the National Science Foundation Engineering Research Center for Re-inventing the Nation's Urban Water Infrastructure.

Luthy is recognized for advancement of environmental engineering with energy-efficient, decentralized water reuse; urban stormwater capture and treatment for water supply; and urban water supply strategies for California in the face of maintaining environmental flows in rivers while addressing climate change and competing demands.

== Educational contributions and achievements ==
Luthy is acknowledged for significant contributions to environmental engineering education, research, and practice. Luthy was on numerous academic advisory boards and visiting committees, as well as committees of the NSF, EPA, NRC, NAE and other organizations. He was a past member and chair of the National Research Council's Water Science and Technology Board. Luthy held positions in the Association of Environmental Engineering and Science Professors including vice-president and president, and was a founding board member and subsequent chair of the AEESP Foundation. He has served on and chaired the NAE Peer Committee for Civil and Environmental Engineering.

== Death ==
Luthy fell ill when he was lecturing on October 6, 2025. He was sent to Palo Alto Hospital but died the same evening, at the age of 80.

== Selected publications ==
- Luthy, R. G., Selleck, R. E., & Galloway, T. R. (1977). Surface properties of petroleum refinery waste oil emulsions. Environmental Science & Technology, 11(13), 1211–1217.
- Luthy, R. G., Selleck, R. E., & Galloway, T. R. (1978). Removal of emulsified oil with organic coagulants and dissolved air flotation. Journal (Water Pollution Control Federation), 331–346.
- Luthy, R. G. (1981). Treatment of coal coking and coal gasification wastewaters. Journal (Water Pollution Control Federation), 325–339.
- Edwards, D. A., Liu, Z., & Luthy, R. G. (1994). Experimental data and modeling for surfactant micelles, HOCs, and soil. Journal of Environmental Engineering, 120, 23–41.
- Ahn, S., Werner, D., Karapanagioti, H. K., McGlothlin, D. R., Zare, R. N., & Luthy, R. G. (2005). Phenanthrene and Pyrene Sorption and Intraparticle Diffusion in Polyoxymethylene, Coke, and Activated Carbon. Environmental Science & Technology, 17(39), 6516–6526.
- Ghosh, U., Zimmerman, J. R., & Luthy, R. G. (2003). PCB and PAH speciation among particle types in contaminated harbor sediments and effects on PAH bioavailability. Environmental Science and Technology, 37.
- Luthy, R. G., Aiken, G. R., Brusseau, M. L., Cunningham, S. D., Gschwend, P. M., Pignatello, J. J., ... & Westall, J. C. (1997). Sequestration of hydrophobic organic contaminants by geosorbents. Environmental Science & Technology, 31(12), 3341–3347.
- Higgins, C. P., & Luthy, R. G. (2006). Sorption of perfluorinated surfactants on sediments. Environmental science & technology, 40(23), 7251–7256.
- Patmont, C. R., Ghosh, U., LaRosa, P., Menzie, C. A., Luthy, R. G., Greenberg, M. S., ... & Quadrini, J. (2015). In situ sediment treatment using activated carbon: a demonstrated sediment cleanup technology. Integrated environmental assessment and management, 11(2), 195–207.
- Luthy, R. G., Wolfand, J. M., & Bradshaw, J. L. (2020). Urban water revolution: Sustainable water futures for California cities. Journal of Environmental Engineering, 146(7), 04020065.
- Luthy, R. G., & Sedlak, D. L. (2015). Urban water-supply reinvention. Daedalus, 144(3), 72–82.
- Gile, B. C., Sciuto, P. A., Ashoori, N., & Luthy, R. G. (2020). Integrated Water Management at the Peri-Urban Interface: A Case Study of Monterey, California. Water (20734441), 12(12)
- Bischel, H. N., Simon, G. L., Frisby, T. M., & Luthy, R. G. (2012). Management experiences and trends for water reuse implementation in Northern California. Environmental science & technology, 46(1), 180–188.
- Luthy, R. G., Sharvelle, S., & Dillon, P. (2019). Urban stormwater to enhance water supply. Environmental Science & Technology, 53(10), 5534–5542.
- Galdi, S. M., Szczuka, A., Shin, C., Mitch, W. A., & Luthy, R. G. (2022). Dissolved methane recovery and trace contaminant fate following mainstream anaerobic treatment of municipal wastewater. ACS Es&t Engineering, 3(1), 121–130.
- Pritchard, J. C., Cho, Y. M., Hawkins, K. M., Spahr, S., Higgins, C. P., & Luthy, R. G. (2023). Predicting PFAS and Hydrophilic Trace Organic Contaminant Transport in Black Carbon-Amended Engineered Media Filters for Improved Stormwater Runoff Treatment. Environmental Science & Technology, 57(38), 14417–14428.
- Spahr, S., Teixidó, M., Gall, S. S., Pritchard, J. C., Hagemann, N., Helmreich, B., & Luthy, R. G. (2022). Performance of biochars for the elimination of trace organic contaminants and metals from urban stormwater. Environmental Science: Water Research & Technology, 8(6), 1287–1299.
- Gile, B. C., Sherris, A. R., Holmes, R. T., Fendorf, S., & Luthy, R. G. Water Supply Planning in the Face of Drought and Ecosystem Flows: Examining the Impact of the Bay-Delta Plan on Bay Area Water Supply. Environmental science & technology.
