= International Centre for Geohazards =

Norwegian research institute

Coordinates: 59°56′55″N 10°43′52″E

The International Centre for Geohazards (ICG) is a Norwegian, multidisciplinary research and educational institute, hosted at the Norwegian Geotechnical Institute (NGI). According to the institute's website, ICG's research activities focus on the assessment, prevention and mitigation of geohazards, in which the latter is defined as a geological state that represents or has the potential to develop further in a situation leading to damage or uncontrolled risk. From this definition, it becomes clear that geohazards are widespread, both spatially and temporally, and are always related to geological conditions and processes in both offshore, coastal and onshore environments.

The International Centre for Geohazards was established in 2002, and is a collaboration between the Norwegian Geotechnical Institute, NORSAR, the University of Oslo, and the Norwegian University of Science and Technology in Trondheim.
