= Wonyong Choi =

South Korean scientist (born 1965)

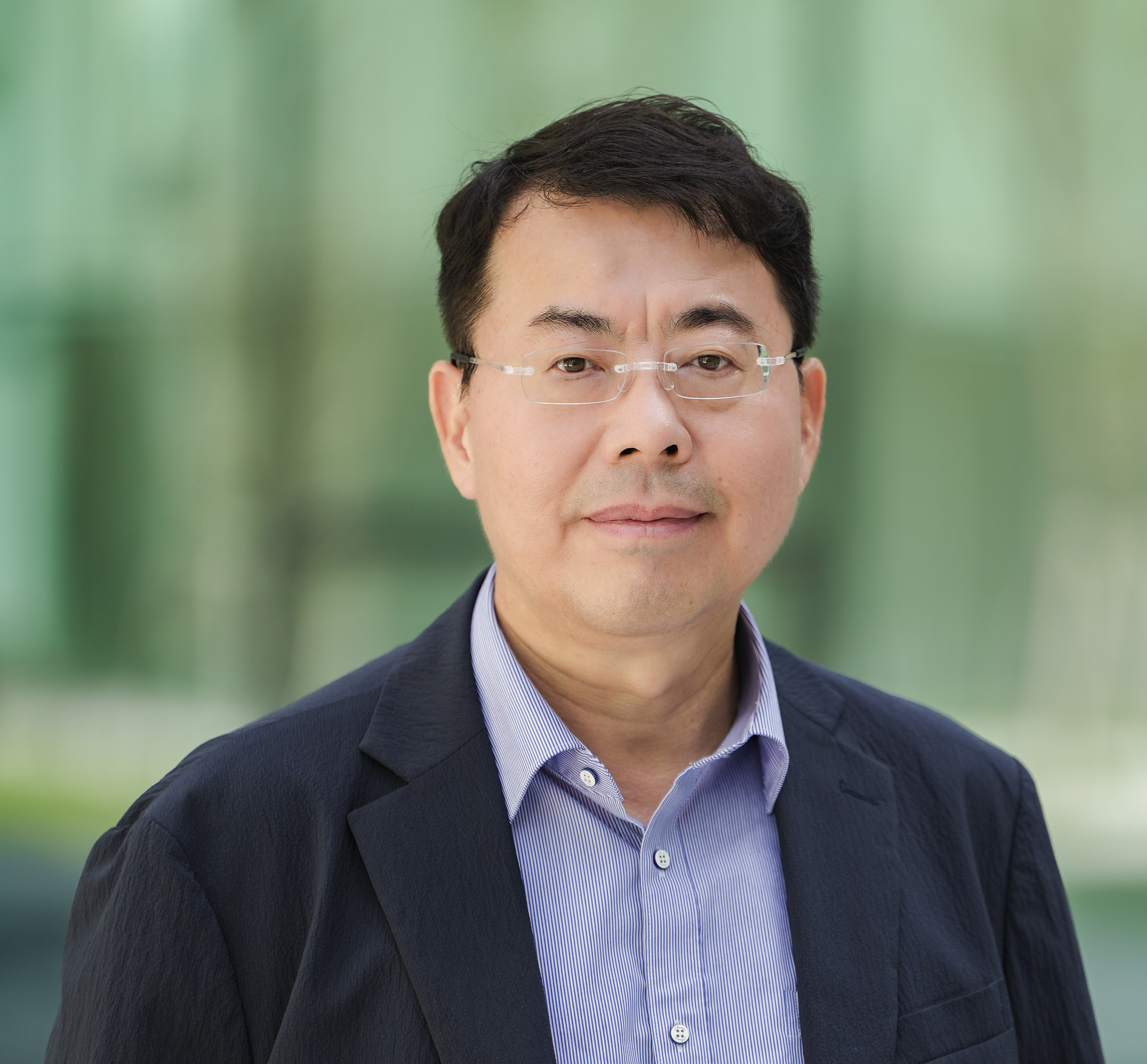
- Born: 1965 (age 60–61); Gimhae, Gyeongnam Province, Korea
- Education: Seoul National University; Pohang University of Science and Technology; California Institute of Technology
- Scientific career
- Fields: Environmental science and engineering Environmental chemistry and catalysis
- Workplaces: Korea Institute of Energy Technology (KENTECH)

Wonyong Choi (Korean: 최원용; Hanja: 崔元鎔; born 1965) is a South Korean environmental scientist, engineer, and academic, known mainly for his work on environmental photocatalysis. He is a Director and a Distinguished Professor for Environmental & Climate Technology at Korea Institute of Energy Technology (KENTECH).

Choi's research has explored semiconductor photocatalysis, focusing on visible-light-active materials, solar fuel production, advanced oxidation processes, and photochemical purification of water and air. His works have been published in academic journals, including Chemical Reviews, Journal of Physical Chemistry, Energy and Environmental Science, Environmental Science & Technology, ACS Catalysis, Applied Catalysis B, and Nature Communications.

Choi has been the inaugural Editor-in-Chief of ACS ES&T Engineering since 2020, previously served as an Associate Editor of Environmental Science & Technology from 2017 to 2019 and was an Editor of Journal of Hazardous Materials between 2008 and 2017. He received the Korean Academy of Science and Technology (KAST) Young Scientist Award in 2005, KAST Science and Technology Award in 2015, Korea Engineering Award in 2018, and Korea Toray Science and Technology Prize in 2024. He was selected as a Highly Cited Researcher by Clarivate Analytics. He is an elected member of the Korean Academy of Science and Technology (KAST), the National Academy of Engineering of Korea (NAEK), and the U.S. National Academy of Engineering (US NAE).

== Education ==
In 1988, Choi completed his B.S. with honors in Engineering (Chemical Technology) at Seoul National University (SNU) and later earned an M.S. in Chemistry (Physical Chemistry) from Pohang University of Science and Technology (POSTECH) in 1990. At the California Institute of Technology (Caltech), he studied semiconductor photocatalysis for the degradation of chlorinated organic pollutants using TiO_{2} nanoparticles, and under the supervision of Michael R. Hoffmann, he obtained a Ph.D. in Chemistry (Environmental Chemistry) from Caltech in 1996.

== Career ==
From 1996 to 1998, Choi served as a Postdoctoral Scholar at NASA/Caltech Jet Propulsion Laboratory (JPL). He subsequently joined the faculty of POSTECH, where he worked from 1998 to 2022 as a professor in the Division of Environmental Science and Engineering. During this period, he also served as a visiting scholar at CALTECH from 2006 to 2007 and again from 2013 to 2014. Since 2020, he has been leading the Leading Researcher Project, funded by the National Research Foundation of Korea. In 2022, he moved from POSTECH to the Korea Institute of Energy Technology (KENTECH), and established the Institute for Environmental and Climate Technology as its inaugural director and a Distinguished Professor.

== Research ==
Choi's research has focused on semiconductor photo(electro)catalysis and photochemical conversion for environmental and energy applications, including solar fuels, CO_{2} conversion, photosynthesis of H_{2}O_{2}, water/air purification, advanced oxidation processes (AOPs), and environmental redox processes. In 1994, he reported that metal ion dopants in quantum-sized TiO_{2} significantly affected photoreactivity by modulating charge carrier recombination dynamics, highlighting their role in optimizing oxidation and reduction processes of chlorinated hydrocarbons. His early works primarily investigated the mechanisms and kinetics of photoinduced charge transfers and redox reactions on pure and modified TiO_{2} photocatalysts. He also explored advanced oxidation processes (AOPs), including Fenton-like systems and various environmental redox reactions.

In his various works, Choi highlighted the potential of semiconductor photocatalysis in environmental applications, providing advanced insights into metal oxide photochemistry in multiphasic environmental systems. He highlighted the enhanced photocatalytic activity of platinized WO_{3} (Pt/WO_{3}) in water under visible light, showcasing its effective degradation of aquatic pollutants and the generation of hydroxyl (OH) radicals.

He developed photocatalysts for air purification by optimizing the structural properties of titania and designed photocatalysts capable of photosynthesizing H_{2}O_{2} from O_{2} reduction. He investigated environmental chemical reactions in frozen solutions and ice, highlighting the ice medium's role in these processes. He proposed that the freeze-concentration effect significantly enhances the redox conversion of various metal oxides and aquatic pollutants (both organic and inorganic).

== Awards and honors ==
- 2005 – Young Scientist Award (Presidential award), Korean Academy of Science and Technology (KAST)
- 2008 – Lectureship Award for Asian and Oceanian Photochemist, Japanese Photochemistry Association
- 2012 – Namgo Chair Professor, POSTECH
- 2014 – Elected Member, KAST
- 2014 – Elected Fellow, Royal Society of Chemistry (RSC)
- 2015 – Science and Technology Award, KAST
- 2018 – Korea Engineering Award (Presidential award)
- 2019 – Academic Award, Korean Society of Environmental Engineers
- 2019-2024 – Highly Cited Researcher, Clarivate Analytics
- 2020 – Doosan Yonkang Environment Award, Doosan Yonkang Foundation
- 2020 – Proud Postechian Award, POSTECH
- 2023 – Elected Member, National Academy of Engineering of Korea (NAEK)
- 2024 – Elected International member, US NAE
- 2024 – Korea Toray Science and Technology Prize, Toray Science Foundation

== Selected articles ==
- Hoffmann, Michael R.; Martin, Scot T.; Choi, Wonyong; Bahnemann, Detlef W. (January 1995). "Environmental Applications of Semiconductor Photocatalysis". Chemical Reviews. 95 (1): 69–96. doi:10.1021/cr00033a004.
- Choi, Wonyong; Termin, Andreas; Hoffmann, Michael R. (December 1994). "The Role of Metal Ion Dopants in Quantum-Sized TiO_{2}: Correlation between Photoreactivity and Charge Carrier Recombination Dynamics". The Journal of Physical Chemistry. 98 (51): 13669–13679. doi:10.1021/j100102a038.
- Park, Hyunwoong; Choi, Wonyong (April 2004). "Effects of TiO_{2} Surface Fluorination on Photocatalytic Reactions and Photoelectrochemical Behaviors". The Journal of Physical Chemistry B. 108 (13): 4086–4093. doi:10.1021/jp036735i.
- Kim, Jungwon; Lee, Chul Wee; Choi, Wonyong (September 2010). "Platinized WO_{3} as an Environmental Photocatalyst that Generates OH Radicals under Visible Light". Environmental Science & Technology. 44 (17): 6849–6854. Bibcode:2010EnST...44.6849K. doi:10.1021/es101981r. PMID 20698551.
- Bokare, Alok D.; Choi, Wonyong (June 2014). "Review of iron-free Fenton-like systems for activating H_{2}O_{2} in advanced oxidation processes". Journal of Hazardous Materials. 275: 121–135. doi:10.1016/j.jhazmat.2014.04.054. PMID 24857896.
- Park, Hyunwoong; Kim, Hyoung-il; Moon, Gun-hee; Choi, Wonyong (2016). "Photoinduced charge transfer processes in solar photocatalysis based on modified TiO_{2}". Energy & Environmental Science. 9 (2): 411–433. doi:10.1039/C5EE02575C.
