= Anne Kiremidjian =

American academic (born 1949)

- Born: Aghavny Hrant Setian; Sofia, Bulgaria
- Education: Queens College, City University of New York; Columbia University; Stanford University
- Known for: Earthquake engineering; Structural health monitoring; Wireless sensor networks
- Spouse: Garo Kiremidjian
- Awards: John Fritz Medal (2018); C. Martin Duke Award (2003)
- Scientific career
- Fields: Earthquake Engineering; Civil engineering

Anne Kiremidjian (née Anna Setian; born August 11, 1949) is a Professor of Civil and Environmental Engineering at Stanford University.

== Biography ==
Kiremidjian was born in Sofia, Bulgaria. She earned her BA in physics (1972) from Queens College, City University of New York and BS in civil engineering (1972) from Columbia University. She then earned her MS (1973) and PhD (1977) from Stanford University under the direction of Haresh C. Shah.

From 1987 to 2002, she served as the Co-Director and Director of the "John A. Blume Earthquake Engineering Center". at Stanford University. Her research has focused on earthquake hazard as well as structural risk analysis.

== Awards ==
She is the 2003 recipient of the Charles Martin Duke Lifeline Earthquake Engineering Award awarded by the American Society of Civil Engineers.

In 2014, she was elected a distinguished member of the American Society of Civil Engineers. She was the 2018 recipient of the John Fritz Medal awarded by the American Association of Engineering Societies.

In October 2020, she was appointed as the C.L. Peck, Class of 1906 Professor in the School of Engineering following James O. Leckie (2007-2020) and Paul V. Roberts (1989-2006).

In 2021, she was elected to the National Academy of Engineering for research and dissemination of probabilistic seismic hazard methods and mentoring.
