= US Army Engineer Command, Europe =

US Army Engineer Command, Europe (ENGCOM)
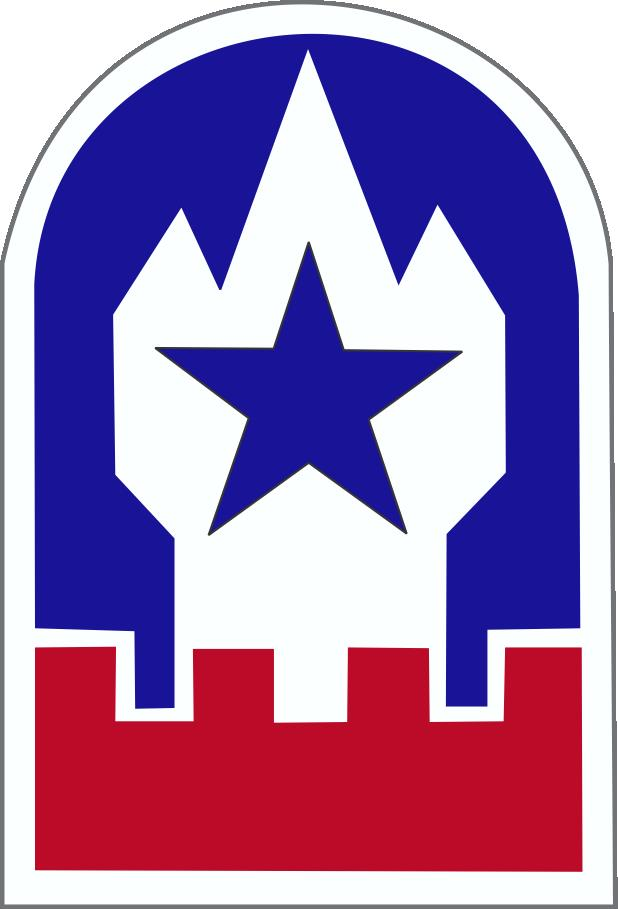
- Active: 1966-1974
- Country: United States
- Branch: United States Army
- Role: Engineer
- Size: Command
- Part of: United States Army Europe
- Garrison/HQ: Frankfurt, West Germany

Commanders
- Notable commanders: COL Robert P. Young (1966-1967) BG Kenneth W. Kennedy (1967-1971) BG Carroll N. LeTellier (1971-1973) BG James C. Donovan (1973-1974)

US Army Engineer Command, Europe (ENGCOM) was a unit of US Army Europe from 1966-1974. The command was the idea of General Andrew P. O'Meara, USAREUR commander 1965-1967 who had been disappointed with Engineer support while 4th Armored Division commander. In November 1966, O'Meara created ENGCOM with Colonel Robert P. Young in command. Col. Young set up his command in Frankfurt. The command reported directly to the Commanding General.

As Young tried to build the new command, he faced many challenges such as finding qualified engineer officers - the war in Vietnam was taking resources Army-wide. Finding qualified German engineers was also difficult due to the low unemployment in the Federal Republic of Germany. Finally, France's decision to leave NATO meant that American units stationed there had to be moved to Germany and this was a high priority mission. The biggest projects were moving SHAPE to Belgium and USEUCOM to Stuttgart.

In September 1967, Young was promoted to Brigadier General and in October was sent to Huntsville, Alabama. Colonel Kenneth W. Kennedy (promoted Brigadier General in 1968) was his replacement. Kennedy's first challenge was to upgrade aging facilities used by the US Army across Germany that dated before World War II, especially poor heating. In 1968, ENGCOM began a program to improve runways and aircraft shelter for the Air Force called TAB VEE.

Due to a fire in 1968, ENGCOM had to build a new headquarters for themselves which was completed in 1969. By June 1971 Kennedy was ready to retire from the Army and he was replaced by Brigadier General Carroll N. LeTellier. During LeTellier's time both the Senate and the Pentagon were complaining about ENGCOM's usefulness. He would serve until August 1973, when he was replaced by Brigadier General James C. Donovan. In 1974, the USAREUR commanding general approved of Project CHASE, a reorganization of the USARUER headquarters.

The Corps of Engineers created a new command - U.S. Army Corps of Engineers, Europe Division under Gen. Donovan.

== Subordinate Units (1973) ==
HQ US Army Engineer Command, Europe	I.G. Farben Bldg, Annex B Frankfurt
HQ Element, US Army Engineer Command, Europe	Gibbs Kaserne, Frankfurt
24th Engineer Construction Group	Kleber Kaserne, Kaiserslautern
Engineer Topographic Center	Tompkins Barracks, Schwetzingen
79th Engineer Construction Battalion	Gerszewski Barracks, Knielingen
94th Engineer Construction Battalion	Ernst Ludwig Kaserne, Darmstadt
249th Engineer Construction Battalion	Gerszewski Barracks, Knielingen
293rd Engineer Construction Battalion	Smith Barracks, Baumholder
370th Engineer Company (Construction Support)	Kleber Kaserne, Kaiserslautern
US Army Engineer District, Nord Bayern	Merrell Barracks, Nürnberg
US Army Engineer District, Sued Bayern	Reese Barracks, Augsburg
US Army Engineer District, Baden Wurttemberg	Wallace Barracks, Stuttgart
US Army Engineer District, Hessen	McNair Kaserne, Frankfurt
US Army Engineer District, Palatinate	Pulaski Barracks, Kaiserslautern
US Army Engineer District, 7th Army Training Center	US Training Center, Grafenwoehr
3336th Labor Service Liaison Detachment	(Lübecker Strasse), Frankfurt
6970th Civilian Labor Group Engineer Construction Battalion	Rheinland Kaserne, Karlsruhe
8252nd Labor Service Engineer Construction Company	Funari Barracks, Mannheim
8361st Labor Service Engineer Construction Company	De La Marne Kaserne, Bingen
8550th Civilian Labor Group Engineer Construction Company	Grenadier Kaserne, Stuttgart
8551st Civilian Labor Group Engineer Construction Company	US Training Center, Grafenwoehr
8552nd Civilian Labor Group Engineer Construction Company	Rheinland Kaserne, Karlsruhe
8850th Labor Service Engineer Construction Company	Verdun Kaserne, Kaiserslautern
8404th Labor Service Engineer Utilities	Frankfurt
