= Carroll LeTellier =

United States Army general (1928–2019)

Carroll N. LeTellier (July 20, 1928 – March 27, 2019) was a US Army Major General and both a Korean War and Vietnam War combat veteran, serving with the US Army Corps of Engineers. As a Brigadier General (United States), he commanded US Army Engineer Command, Europe (ENGCOM), headquartered then in Frankfurt, Germany. In 1976, LeTellier retired from the military at the rank of Major general (United States) to a private civilian practice at Sverdrup Civil, Inc., the then 6th largest architecture and civil engineering firm in the United States, which he in turn retired from as vice president in 2002.

== Education ==
The Citadel, The Military College of South Carolina awarded Major general (United States) Carroll LeTellier a BS in civil engineering '49, MIT awarded LeTellier a Master in Civil Engineering, and The Citadel subsequently also awarded LeTellier a Doctorate in Civil Engineering (Honoris causa '99).

== Death ==
A resident of Charleston, South Carolina, LeTellier died on March 27, 2019, at the age of 90.

== Awards and decorations ==
LeTellier's military decorations include the Distinguished Service Medal (U.S. Army), 5 awards of the Legion of Merit, the Bronze Star Medal, and the Air Medal. The Major General was inducted into the mere 212 member US National Academy of Engineering.

== See also ==
List of members of the National Academy of Engineering (Civil)
