= DSV-5 Nemo =

Submersible used by the United States Navy

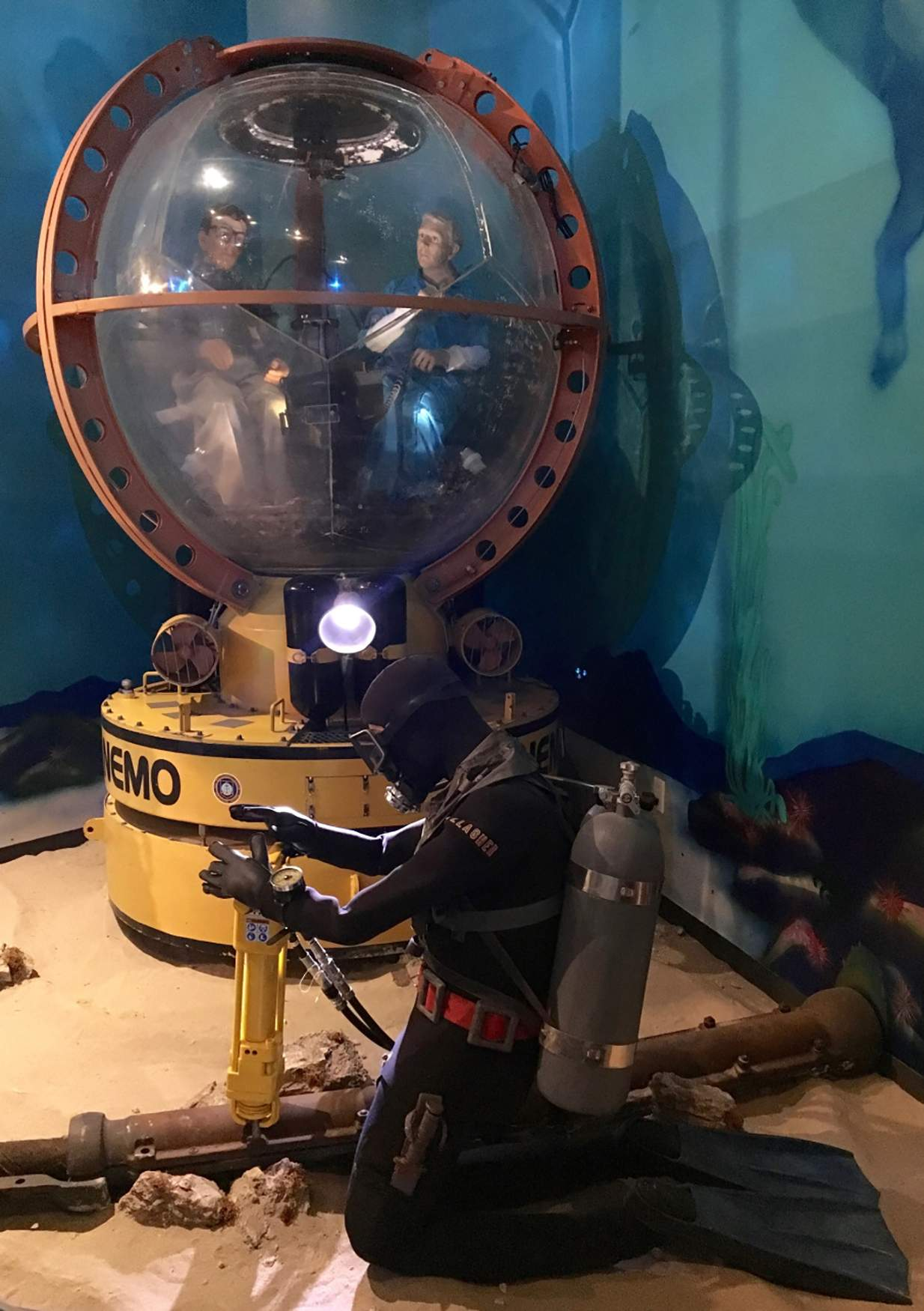
- DSV-5 NEMO on display at the Seabee Museum

History

United States
- Builder: Naval Civil Engineering Laboratory
- Launched: 1970
- Commissioned: 1970
- Decommissioned: 30 September 1986
- Fate: Transferred to "other government agencies" (likely CIA)
- Status: On display at U.S. Navy Seabee Museum

General characteristics
- Class & type: Alvin-class deep submergence vehicle
- Displacement: 8,000 lb (3.6 t)
- Length: 66 in (1.7 m)
- Beam: 80 in (2.0 m)
- Draft: 110 in (2.8 m)
- Speed: .75 knots (1.39 km/h; 0.86 mph)
- Endurance: 8 hours
- Test depth: 600 ft (180 m)
- Complement: 2 (pilot and observer)

DSV-5, ex-NEMO (Naval Experimental Manned Observatory), was a submersible used by the United States Navy between 1970 and 1986 to oversee and observe undersea construction work. NEMO had a spherical transparent acrylic hull, which gave occupants panoramic vision. NEMO was the first submersible with a hull made entirely out of transparent acrylic (Plexiglass), and much of her career was spent testing this hull design. NEMO was found to be an effective observation platform, despite not being able to hover in place, and acrylic-hulled submersibles have continued to be built and operated in the United States. NEMO is considered part of the Alvin class of Deep Submergence Vehicles despite bearing little resemblance to the other subs of the class. NEMO was transferred to "other government agencies" (likely the CIA) in 1986 and retired from government service in 2011. It was then given to the U.S. Navy Seabee Museum, where it remains on display.

== Design ==
NEMO consisted of a spherical pressure hull with a 61-inch (1.5 m) inside diameter and a 66-inch (1.7 m) outside diameter, plus outside life support and operational subsystems housed below the crew compartment. The hull was made from 2.5-inch (6.4 cm) thick transparent acrylic, Poly(methyl methacrylate), and housed a crew of two (pilot and observer). Operational subsystems included a main lead acid battery power supply, electrical distribution and control circuitry, a hydraulic system to operate a self-contained winch/anchor system, and two side-mounted thrusters for rotation and limited horizontal movement. A compressed air ballast system was used for controlling buoyancy. NEMO was untethered and relied on its own batteries for power. NEMO also carried a radio for communicating with NEMO's mothership, divers, or other submersibles.

NEMO was designed for depths of up to 600 feet (180 m), the depth of the continental shelf, although it was later certified for 1,000-foot (300 m) depths. Its deepest recorded dive was 614 feet (187 m). Its life support system gave it an endurance of 8 hours, though it also had an emergency backup system that could provide up to an additional 24 hours. NEMO weighed 8,000 pounds (3.6 t) and could carry a payload of 450 pounds (200 kg). The side thrusters could propel NEMO at speeds of up to .75 knots (1.39 km/h; 0.86 mph).

== Operational history ==
NEMO was built alongside two additional hulls by the Southwest Research Institute at Naval Air Station Point Mugu in California, under contract for and in cooperation with the Naval Civil Engineering Laboratory (NCEL), now the Naval Facilities Engineering Command Engineering Service Center. NEMO's mission was to test the feasibility and utility of an all-acrylic spherical hull and then to support underwater construction, repair, and salvage work. Its other two hulls were used for fatigue and collapse testing, which found a crush depth of 4,150 feet (1,260 m). NCEL evaluated NEMO in the Bahamas between 1970 and 1972, performing over 100 dives. The evaluation concluded that NEMO was an effective, comfortable, safe, and reliable underwater observation platform, although its usefulness was hindered by the lack of a hovering capability. Following its evaluation, NEMO was used by the Navy Seabees to observe and monitor undersea construction. NEMO provided a shirt-sleeve environment for nondiving engineers, technicians, and scientists to oversee undersea construction, allowing them to see and communicate with divers for the first time. It played an important role in undersea cable laying and maintenance. NEMO made several hundred dives off the Bahamas and Channel Islands over the course of its Navy career.

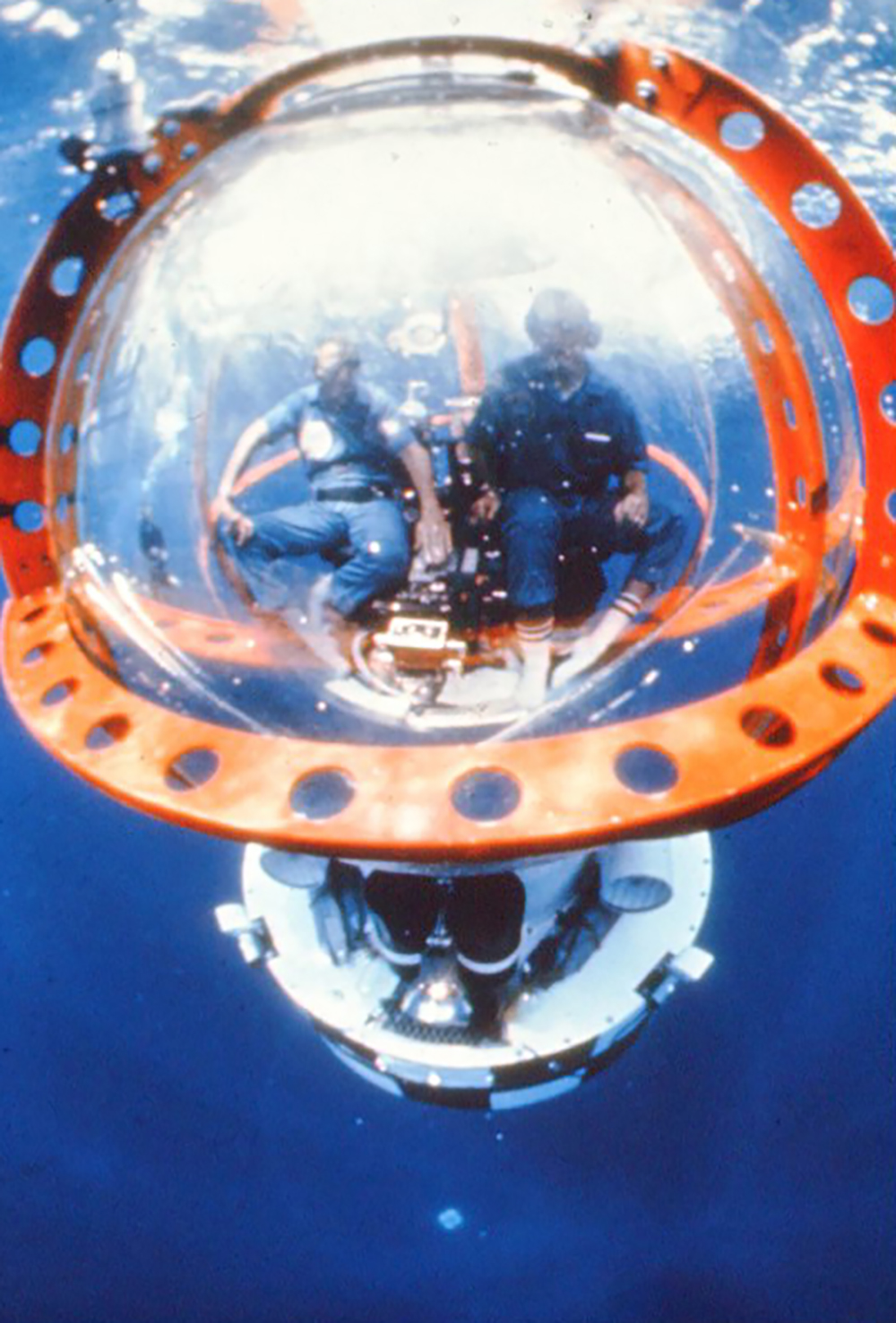
NEMO submerged

NEMO was transferred to "other government agencies" (likely the CIA) on 30 September 1986. Details about its activities since being transferred are obscured. In July 2011, NEMO left government service and was transferred to the U.S. Navy Seabee Museum at Naval Base Ventura County, Port Hueneme, California, where it is still on display.

== See also ==
- Alvin (DSV-2) – Crewed deep-ocean research submersible
