= Rotary-pressure sounding =

Symbol used in drawings

Rotary-pressure sounding is a method of testing soil conditions that might be performed as part of a geotechnical investigation. A series of rods, with a specially designed tip, is forced into the ground under downward pressure. The rotation and speed of insertion are maintained at a constant rate, and the amount of force required to maintain that rate is measured. The results can be interpreted to provide information about sediment stratification, and sometimes also the type of soil and the depth to bedrock.

The rotary-pressure sounding method was developed by the Norwegian Geotechnical Institute (NGI) and the Norwegian Public Roads Administration (NPRA) in 1967.
