= Alfred Noble (engineer) =

American civil engineer (1844–1914)

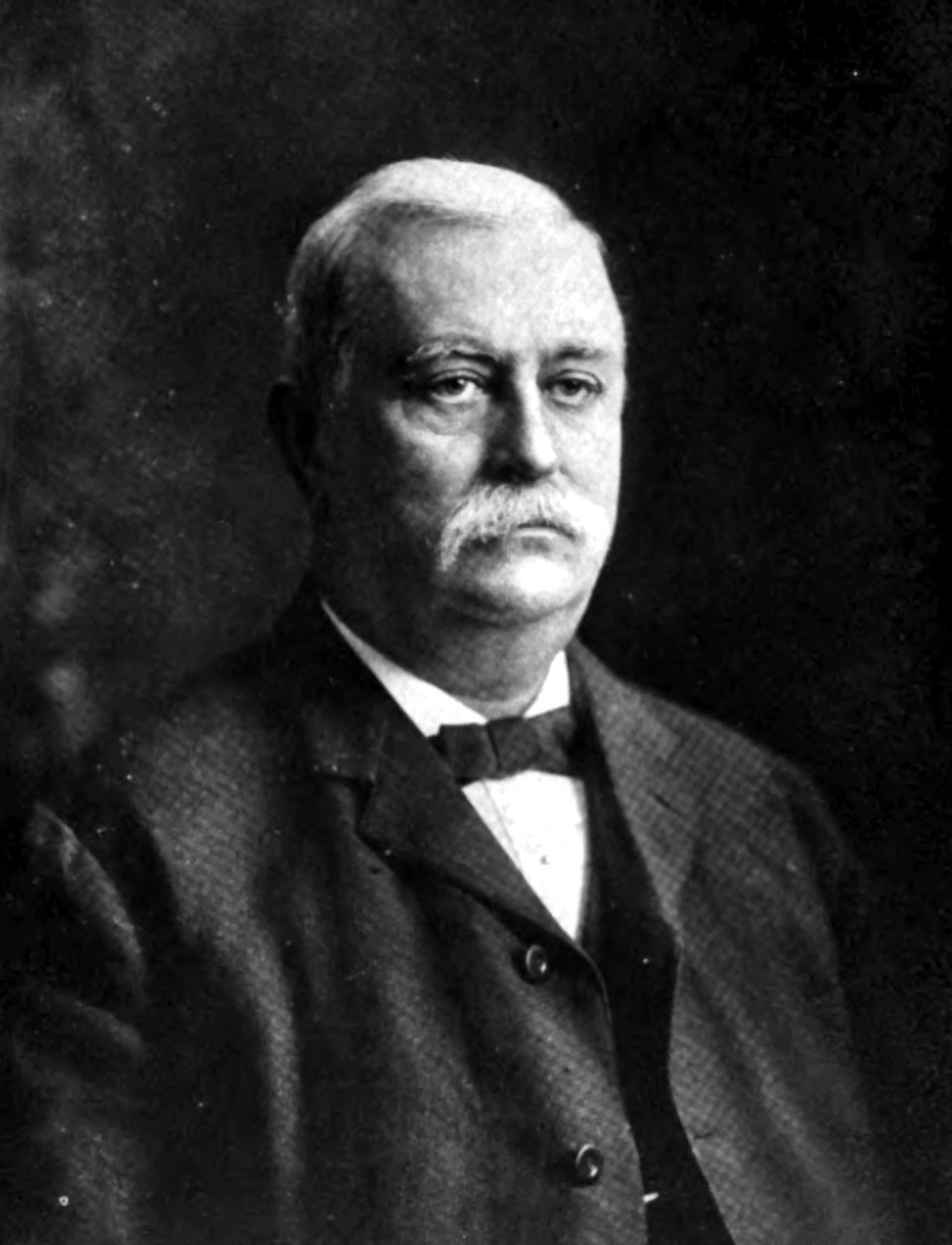
- Born: August 7, 1844; Livonia, Michigan, U.S.
- Died: April 19, 1914 (aged 69); Manhattan, New York, U.S.
- Resting place: Woodlawn Cemetery; Bronx, New York, U.S.
- Parent(s): Charles Noble; Lovina Douw

Alfred Noble (August 7, 1844 – April 19, 1914) was an American civil engineer who was best known for his work on canals, particularly the Soo Locks between the Great Lakes of Huron and Superior, and the Panama Canal. Born in Livonia, Michigan to farmers Charles Noble and Lovina Douw, Noble was locally educated. He served in the Union Army from 1862 to 1865, after which time he entered the University of Michigan as a sophomore. Noble graduated with his University of Michigan class in June 1870, receiving his degree in civil engineering at age 26. After graduation, Noble went to work full-time on harbor surveys and improvements along the shores of Lake Michigan and Lake Huron.

He was chief engineer for the Pennsylvania Railroad's New York City East River projects, which built tunnels carrying four lanes of track between Manhattan and Queens. Amtrak, the Long Island Railroad, and New Jersey Transit continue to run trains through these tunnels well into their second century of use.

He was president of the American Society of Civil Engineers in 1903, and in 1929, the society established the Alfred Noble Prize in his honor (not to be confused with the Nobel Prize).
