= John A. Blume =

American structural engineer

- Born: April 8, 1909; Gonzales, California
- Died: March 1, 2002; Hillsborough, California
- Education: Stanford University, B.A. Engineering 1933, Engineers Degree 1935, PhD 1967
- Spouse: Jene Blume
- Engineering career
- Discipline: structural engineering, earthquake engineering
- Practice name: John A. Blume Associates
- Awards: Moisseiff Award, National Academy of Engineering

John Augustus Blume (April 8, 1909 – March 1, 2002) was an American structural engineer born in Gonzales, California. He first decided he wanted to study earthquake engineering when he witnessed the Santa Barbara earthquake of 1925. In 1929, he went to Stanford University, where he later received his A.B.degree, his graduate degree of engineer and his doctorate.

Blume's career included major contributions to dynamic theory, soil structure interactions, and the inelastic behavior of structures, earning him the title of the “Father of Earthquake Engineering.” Blume died at the age of 92 at his Hillsborough, California home on March 1, 2002.

== John A. Blume Earthquake Engineering Center ==
John A. Blume provided funding to found the John A. Blume Earthquake Engineering center at Stanford University, which began operations in 1975.

== Blume Center Directors ==
Years	Directors or Co-Directors
2002-Current	Gregory G. Deierlein
1995-2002	Anne S. Kiremidjian
1988-1995	Helmut Krawinkler and Anne S. Kiremidjian
1985-1988	James M. Gere and Helmut Krawinkler
1974-1985	Haresh C. Shah and James M. Gere

== See also ==
- George W Housner
- Maurice Anthony Biot
