= David Sedlak =

American environmental engineer

David L. Sedlak is an American environmental engineer and currently the Plato Malozemoff Professor at University of California, Berkeley. He was previously Editor-in-Chief of American Chemical Society's ES&T and ES&T Letters. His research interests are chemical contaminants and water resources. He was elected a member of the National Academy of Engineering in 2016 for contributions to environmental aqueous chemistry, especially in the areas of water reuse, water contaminants, and urban water infrastructure.

== Education ==
He earned his PhD in Water Chemistry from the University of Wisconsin at Madison in 1992 and his B.S. in Environmental Science from Cornell University in 1986.

== Publications ==
- Shane A. Snyder, Paul Westerhoff, Yeomin Yoon, and David L. Sedlak. Environmental Engineering Science. July 2004, 20(5): 449–469. https://doi.org/10.1089/109287503768335931
- William A. Mitch, Jonathan O. Sharp, R. Rhodes Trussell, Richard L. Valentine, Lisa Alvarez-Cohen, and David L. Sedlak. Environmental Engineering Science. July 2004, 20(5): 389–404. https://doi.org/10.1089/109287503768335896
- Formation of N-Nitrosodimethylamine (NDMA) from Dimethylamine during Chlorination, William A. Mitch and David L. Sedlak, Environ. Sci. Technol., 2002, 36 (4), pp 588–595
