= Andrew P. O'Meara =

American general (1907–2005)

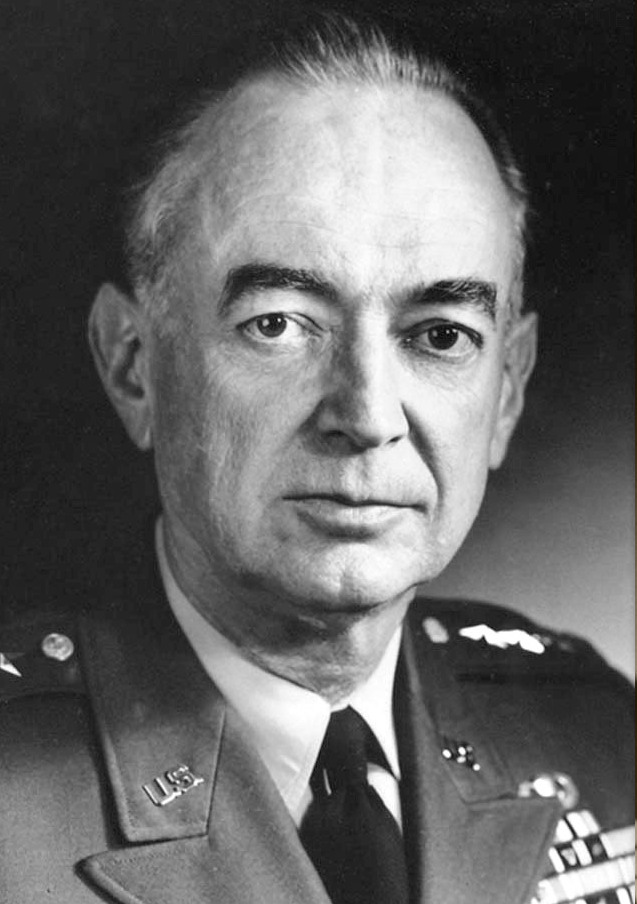
- O'Meara as commander in chief, United States Southern Command
- Born: 23 March 1907; West Bend, Wisconsin, U.S.
- Died: 30 September 2005 (aged 98); Arlington, Virginia, U.S.
- Burial place: Arlington National Cemetery
- Military career
- Allegiance: United States
- Branch: United States Army
- Service years: 1930–1967
- Rank: General
- Commands: United States Southern Command; United States Army Europe; 4th Armored Division
- Conflicts: World War II; Korean War
- Awards: Army Distinguished Service Medal (2); Silver Star; Legion of Merit (2); Bronze Star Medal

Andrew Pick O'Meara (23 March 1907 – 30 September 2005) was a United States Army four-star general who served as Commander-in-Chief, United States Southern Command from 1961 to 1965, and Commander-in-Chief, United States Army Europe/Commander, Central Army Group from 1965 to 1967. He is a grandson of the 4th and 6th Mayor of West Bend, Patrick O'Meara, as well as the 11th Mayor of West Bend, Andrew Pick.

== Military career ==
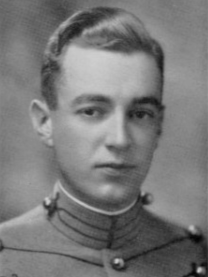
As a West Point cadet

O'Meara was born on 23 March 1907, in West Bend, Wisconsin to Emma and Thomas Francis O'Meara. He graduated from the United States Military Academy in 1930 and was commissioned in the field artillery. He began his career in the horse artillery with the 4th Field Artillery from 1931 to 1934. Other early assignments included teaching physics at West Point and various staff assignments. He married Ellen Fraser (1906–1995) in 1933.

O'Meara served as a battery commander in the 4th Armored Division in 1941, and in 1942 took command of the 94th Field Artillery Battalion. By the end of World War II he was the Assistant Artillery Commander of VII Corps. Following the war, he attended the Command and General Staff College in 1946, and the National War College from 1951 to 1952.

During the Korean War O'Meara was the artillery commander for the 7th Infantry Division, and later the artillery commander for IX Corps. Promoted to brigadier general in 1952, he earned the Silver Star in 1953 for reconnaissance near Kumhwa.

O'Meara spent the years after Korea working in research and development for the army, first with the Research & Development Division of the Army General Staff, then as Deputy Chief of Research & Development for the United States Army from 1955 to 1957.

He was next appointed as the commanding general of the 4th Armored Division on 1 August 1957. O'Meara served with the division until 13 February 1959, when he was assigned to France as director of military assistance for the United States European Command. During this assignment he was promoted to Lieutenant General.

From 6 January 1961 to 22 February 1965 he was the commander United States Southern Command. During his tenure he was promoted to General.

From 18 March 1965 to 1 June 1967, O'Meara was the commander United States Army Europe (USAREUR). During his tenure, he created US Army Engineer Command, Europe (ENGCOM) to improve the engineer support and organization of USAREUR.

O'Meara was an avid squash player, and during his tenure at both SOUTHCOM and United States Army Europe ordered the installation of squash courts at bases under his command.

== Decorations ==
O'Meara's awards and decorations included the Army Distinguished Service Medal with oak leaf cluster, the Silver Star, the Legion of Merit with oak leaf cluster, the Bronze Star Medal, and the Air Medal.

== Post-military ==
O'Meara retired from the army in 1967, settling in the Washington, D.C., area. He died on 30 September 2005, of a stroke in his home at the age of 98 in Arlington, Virginia, and was buried in Arlington National Cemetery. He was preceded in death by his wife and a daughter, and survived by a son and a daughter, 13 grandchildren, and 26 great-grandchildren.

Military offices
Preceded by Paul L. Freeman Jr.	Commanding General of United States Army Europe; 18 March 1965 – 1 June 1967	Succeeded by James H. Polk
