= Robert M. Koerner =

American engineer and academic (1933–2019)

- Koerner in 2005
- Born: Robert Michael Koerner; December 2, 1933; Philadelphia, Pennsylvania, U.S.
- Died: December 1, 2019 (aged 85)
- Education: Drexel University (BS, MSCE); Duke University (PhD)
- Occupations: Civil engineer, academic
- Known for: Geosynthetics; founder of the Geosynthetic Institute
- Spouse: Pauline W. Feuerer (m. 1959; died 2019)
- Children: 3
- Parent(s): Michael H. Koerner; Cecilia Grahammer Koerner
- Awards: Member, National Academy of Engineering (1998)

Robert M. Koerner (December 2, 1933 – December 1, 2019) was an American engineer and academic. He was Professor Emeritus at Drexel University and director emeritus of the Geosynthetic Institute. He died on December 1, 2019.

== Biography ==
Koerner had been interested in geotechnical/geosynthetic engineering since graduating from Drexel with a Bachelor of Civil Engineering degree in 1956. Academically this was followed with an MSCE from Drexel in 1963 and a Ph.D. from Duke in 1968. He took additional engineering courses at Columbia and Delaware and also law courses at Temple between his masters and doctoral degrees. His teaching/research faculty career began in 1968 and continued at Drexel until his retirement in 2004.

In 1980, Koerner co-authored the first textbook on geosynthetics along with Joseph P. Welsh. The book, Construction and Geotechnical Engineering Using Synthetic Fabrics, was published by Wiley (publisher).

Subsequently, he was founder and director, and then director emeritus at the Geosynthetic Institute in the Philadelphia suburb of Folsom, Pennsylvania. Koerner published widely (~850 books, book chapters, papers in journals, conferences, symposia, magazines and major research reports). His most widely used publication is the sixth edition of his textbook Designing With Geosynthetics. It has sold over 40,000 copies and has been translated into several languages.

Koerner was a registered professional engineer in Pennsylvania, an honorary member of American Society of Civil Engineers (ASCE), a “diplomate”, “hero” and “legend” of the ASCE Geo-Institute. He was a member of the National Academy of Engineering and a Diplomate in the Academy of Geo-Professionals in its inaugural class of 2009. Symposia in his honor are from Drexel in 2003, ASCE's Mechanics Section in 2005, and GeoInstitute's Geoenvironmental Engineering Division in 2015. He was awarded the Geosynthetic Materials Association's Robert M. Koerner Biennial Lectureship and the annual GeoMiddle East Conference Lectureship both in 2017.

Koerner was awarded the A. J. Drexel Paul Alumni Award from Drexel University Alumni Association in 2018–2019.

== Personal life ==
Koerner married Pauline "Paula" W. Feuerer on November 15, 1959, in Narberth, Pennsylvania. They had three children: Michael, George and Pauline. Paula Koerner managed finances, communications and events for the Geosynthetic Research Institute and the Geosynthetic Institute, and their son George Koerner later became director of GSI.

In 2001, the couple founded the Koerner Family Foundation, which awards fellowships to doctoral students in engineering. According to the foundation's president, their son Michael Koerner, they endowed their savings to the fellowship fund.

Robert and Paula Koerner both died on December 1, 2019.

== Select works ==
- Koerner, R. M. and Welsh, J. P. (1980), Construction and Engineering Using Synthetic Fabrics, Wiley (John) & Sons, Limited, 267 pgs.
- Koerner, R. M. and Koerner, P. W. (2008), Bob and Paula Koerner: A Success Story, Xlibris Publishing Co., 255 pgs.
- Koerner, R. M. (2012), Designing With Geosynthetics, 6th Edition, Xlibris Publishing CO., 914 pgs.
- Koerner, R. M. (2016), Geotextiles: From Design to Applications, Woodhead Publishing Co., Amsterdam, 617 pgs.

== See also ==
- List of members of the National Academy of Engineering (Civil)
