= Ronald Gibala =

Ronald Gibala is an American engineer.

Gibala completed a bachelor's degree in metallurgical engineering from the Carnegie Institute of Technology in 1960. He pursued further study in the subject at the University of Illinois at Urbana–Champaign, earning a master's degree in 1962, followed by a doctorate in 1964. Gibala began teaching at Case Western Reserve University upon completing his Ph.D. He remained on the faculty until 1984. He later moved to the University of Michigan and was subsequently appointed to the L. H. and F. E. Van Vlack Professorship. In 2004, Gibala was elected a fellow of The Minerals, Metals & Materials Society "[f]or seminal research on intermetallics; internal friction; interstitial solutes in metals, surface effects, on mechanical behavior; and excellence in service to the materials' community."
