= Jerome B. Gilbert =

American engineer, Water utility manager

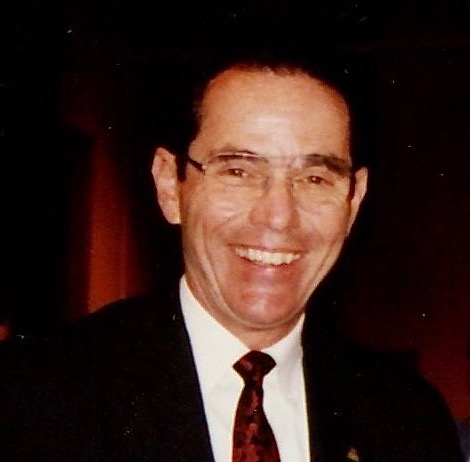
- Born: November 29, 1930; Dayton, Ohio, U.S.
- Died: May 13, 2025 (aged 94)
- Education: BS in Civil Engineering, University of Cincinnati, 1953; MS in Civil Engineering, Stanford University, 1954.
- Occupations: Water utility manager, Consulting engineer and Pollution control state official
- Known for: A water utility leader who led the industry protecting public health and effectively managing utilities and consulting firms.
- Awards: George Warren Fuller Award, American Water Works Association, 1971; Medal for Outstanding Service, AWWA, 1989; Honorary Membership, AWWA, 1984; Abel Wolman Award of Excellence, AWWA, 2005; Water Industry Hall of Fame, AWWA, 2015; Elected to National Academy of Engineering, 1989;

Jerome B. Gilbert (November 29, 1930 – May 13, 2025) was an American water utility manager, consulting engineer and pollution control state official whose career was focused on crafting efficient water utility operations. He graduated with a master's degree from Stanford University. He worked for the United States Army Medical Service Corps, North Marin Water District, California water pollution control agencies, J.B. Gilbert & Associates and the East Bay Municipal Utility District. In 1991, he opened a solo consulting engineering practice serving water utilities and industries in the U.S.

He was active in the American Water Works Association, and he served as an officer in that organization over several decades. He was a member of other water organizations. He received a number of awards for his service, and in 1989, he was elected to the National Academy of Engineering.

== Early life ==
Jerome B. Gilbert was born in 1930 in Dayton, Ohio. He attended grammar school and high school in Dayton. His mother, Mathilda Gilbert, was a concert pianist, and his father, Maurice Gilbert, was a city attorney. He had one sibling, Paul Gilbert.

== Education ==
In 1953, he earned his undergraduate degree in Civil Engineering at the University of Cincinnati. He finished his master's degree in Civil Engineering Administration in 1954 at Stanford University specializing in construction engineering and cost control.

== Personal life ==
Before he finished his undergraduate degree, he was introduced to Judy Bogen and they were married in 1952. They had three daughters Victoria Quintanilla, Jean Smith, and Tania Scheer. Judy (Bogen) Gilbert is recognized as an authority on teaching English pronunciation. She has published several books on this topic with Cambridge University Press.

Tennis was an important part of his life. He was captain of the team that won the Dayton high school championship in 1948. He was on the University of Cincinnati tennis team for four years. He was captain of the Army tennis team that won the Army championship in 1955.

== Early career ==
After finishing his master's degree, he received a commission in the United States Army Medical Service Corps. He was stationed at Fort Chaffee in Arkansas where his duties included mess hall inspection and water and wastewater control on the post. He moved with his family to the San Francisco Bay Area where he worked for T.C. Binkley construction engineer in Palo Alto. His first job was to develop a master plan for the Alameda County Water District. He also designed the Middle Field Reservoir for that agency.

== North Marin County Water District ==
Gilbert was chosen as assistant manager and chief engineer for North Marin in May 1958. Gilbert developed a master plan for North Marin creating one large, integrated water system. In March 1959, he was selected as General Manager for the utility. In June 1960, a bond issue was passed which funded a 10-mile, 30-inch pipeline to the Russian River and many improvements to the North Marin County Water District system. Gilbert managed a 7.4 percent rate increase in 1961. While at the District, he became President of the Eel River Association, which was a consortium of 10 northern California counties seeking additional water supplies.

== California Water Pollution Control Agencies ==
In 1964, he was appointed by Governor Pat Brown to a seat on the Bay Area Water Pollution Control Board. He was vice chair of the committee that drafted the Porter-Cologne Water Quality Control Act and led pollution enforcement actions against cities and industries to clean up San Francisco Bay. His California organizational work included: authorship of the Urban Water Management Planning Act, establishment of the California Urban Water Agencies, development of planning legislation and programs that are the foundation of today's pollution and water quality control in California.

Gilbert was named executive director of the California State Water Resources Control Board in February 1969. As executive officer, he warned three Marin sewage dischargers that construction bans would remain in place until they completed the design of a subregional wastewater system and discontinued discharge of raw sewage during wet weather.

== J.B. Gilbert & Associates ==
An early consulting assignment was funded by the U.S. Public Health Service where Gilbert and others assessed the viability of Filipino water systems. Gilbert founded J.B. Gilbert & Associates in 1972. He provided consulting engineering services to public and private clients on water quality and wastewater planning, engineering and water conservation. The firm prepared industrial, water and environmental plans for such companies as Dow Chemical and Sunkist Growers, Incorporated and such cities as San Francisco, Sacramento and San Diego. Work products included water rights applications, rate studies, environmental reports, regional water studies, testimony and presentations. In 1977, the firm was acquired by Brown & Caldwell consulting engineers.

== East Bay Municipal Utility District ==
Gilbert was named General Manager in February 1981. As General Manager and Chief Engineer (1981-91), Gilbert directed operations of a California regional water and wastewater utility with recreation, land management and power generation responsibilities. Issues that were addressed during his tenure included: water rights, watershed protection, conservation, health and environmental regulations, wastewater treatment, reuse, industrial pretreatment, computerization of administrative function and system operations, major plant modernization, rates, budgets and financing, interagency cooperation and state and federal legislation. Gilbert retired from East Bay MUD in April 1991.

== Consulting Engineer Practice ==
Gilbert was an independent consulting engineer (1991 to the 2020s) providing advice on water resources, water transfers and rights, regulatory compliance, water and wastewater management and rate analysis. Activities included:

- Management and Public-Private Partnerships. Assistance on Seattle, Wisconsin and San Gabriel Basin (California) projects to develop design/build/operate privatization strategies and specifications employing a public/private partnership model. Of these, the Seattle consultation spanned a ten-year period in which Gilbert partnered with Seattle Water in conceiving and executing the first and second major use in the US of a design/build/operate procurement approach in developing large-scale municipal drinking water treatment plants. He developed the organization concept, goals and objectives for the Western Urban Water Coalition, assisted in a management audit of the Puerto Rico Water and Sewer Authority and provided assistance to the Sydney Water Board of Australia in establishing an expert review panel.
- Groundwater Management. Gilbert assisted private (Superfund potentially responsible parties) and public agencies (Three Valleys Municipal Water District, Metropolitan Water District, and the San Gabriel Watermaster) in developing strategies, policies and cost sharing for the conjunctive use and remediation project for the extraction, treatment and delivery of water to the drinking water systems in the San Gabriel Basin and similar work in the San Fernando Basin.
- Water Treatment and Watershed Protection. He was appointed by Seattle, New York, San Francisco and EPA (for New York City review) to expert panels to provide independent assessment of watershed practices, public health protection and water treatment facility plans and operations to assure compliance with regulations under the Safe Drinking Water Act. He served as a member of a technical review committees for watershed master plans prepared by the City of San Francisco and the Santa Clara Valley Water District.
- Water Transfers. Gilbert served as a principal in "Water Transfer Associates" and provided assistance in the transfer of water from public and private water right holders to potential buyers for urban, environmental or agricultural use in Northern California. His work resulted in "wet water" transfers in Yolo and Alameda Counties and studies of transfers in Sacramento, San Joaquin and Fresno Counties.

== Professional associations ==
Gilbert was a member of a number of professional associations, and he held offices in many of them. Early in his career, he became active in the American Water Works Association serving as Chair of the California-Nevada section of AWWA. He was President of national AWWA from 1979 to 1980, and he served on their Board of Directors for several years.

Other offices in professional associations included:

- International Water Supply Association/International Water Association. Over a 35 year involvement, Gilbert chaired: the Scientific and Technical Council, the Management and Policy Council, the Program Committee and the Distinguished Fellows Group. He also served on the Board of Directors on numerous occasions (1980s to 2015)
- American Academy of Environmental Engineers, President (1991-1992)
- American Water Works Association Water Research Foundation, Chairman (1986-89)
- Association of California Water Agencies, Board Member (1985-91)
- California Urban Water Agencies, Chairman and Member (1988-91)
- California Municipal Utilities Association, Board Member (1981-91)
- National Academy of Sciences Water Science and Technology Board, Member (1982-86)
- National Drinking Water Advisory Council of EPA, Member (1975-78)

Gilbert was a member of the American Academy of Environmental Engineers, Water Environment Federation, American Society of Civil Engineers, American Water Works Association and the International Water Supply Association.

He was a registered professional engineer in California, Nevada and Ohio.

== Honors ==
- Novato Junior Chamber of Commerce, Distinguished Service Award (1965)
- National Academy of Engineering, elected Member (1989)
- American Water Works Association, Water Industry Hall of Fame (2015), Abel Wolman Award of Excellence (2005) (The Abel Wolman Award is given “to recognize those whose careers in the water works industry exemplify vision, creativity and excellent professional performance characteristic of Abel Wolman's long and productive career.”) Medal for Outstanding Service (1989), Honorary Member (1984), George Warren Fuller Award (1970)
- Institution of Water Engineers and Managers (UK), Friendship Medal (1992)
- University of Cincinnati, Distinguished Alumnus Award (1981)
- International Water Supply Association/International Water Association, Honorary Life Membership (2006)

== See also ==
- List of members of the National Academy of Engineering

== Publications ==
- Westerhoff, G., Gale, D., Gilbert, J.B., Haskins, S., and Reiter, P.D. (2003). The Evolving Water Utility. American Water Works Association. Denver, Colorado.
- Gilbert, J.B. and Gaston, J.M. (1990). "Treatment Changes at East Bay Municipal Utility District to Control Disinfection By-Products." AQUA. June.
- Gilbert, J.B., Bishop, W.J., and Weber, J.A. (1990). "Reducing Water Demand During Drought Years." Jour. AWWA. 82:5.
- Gilbert, J.B. and Snoeyink, V.L. (1989). "Health Concerns and Regulatory Impacts with Disinfection By-Products." WSRT AQUA. February.
- Gilbert, J.B. (1987). "Preparing Short and Long Term Measures for Mitigation of Droughts." Water Supply, IWSA. January.
- Gilbert, J.B. and Ford, G.L. (1986). "Rehabilitation and Replacement Planning." Jour. AWWA. 78:4.
- Gilbert, J.B. (1978). "The California Drought--Out of Disaster, Better Water Management." Jour. AWWA. 70:2.
- Gilbert, J.B. and Miller, W.J. (1975). "Water Quality and Resources Planning Must be United." Water and Wastes Engineering.
- Gilbert, J.B. (1974). "Groundwater Pollution--From the Waste Discharger's Viewpoint." Groundwater. 12:3. May.
- Gilbert, J.B. (1974). "The Water Industry in the Decade of Environmental Concern." Jour. AWWA. 66:5.
- Gilbert, J.B. and Robie, R.B. (1971). "Control of Estuarine Pollution." Natural Resources Journal. 11:2. Spring.
- Gilbert, J.B. and Storrs, P.N. (1970). "Water Quality Planning and Management." Jour. AWWA. 62:3.
- Gilbert, J.B. (1968). "Aesthetics in the Design of Water Facilities." Jour. AWWA. 60:2.
- Gilbert, J.B. (1964)."Water Through Automation from Sea Level Up to 1500 Feet." Water and Wastes Engineering.

== Selected presentations ==
- Gilbert, J.B. and Goodrich, J.A. (1996). “Connecting Superfund Remedies with Water Supply”, Twentieth Biennial Conference on Ground Water. San Diego, California.
- Gilbert, J.B. (1994). "Management Perspectives on Rehabilitation," Keynote Address. IWSA Regional Conference. Zurich, Switzerland.
- Gilbert, J.B. (1991). "Water & Waste Water System Design, Construction & Financing." National Academy of Engineering Symposium. Washington, DC.
- Gilbert, J.B. and Dawson, A.L. (1990). "Bay Area Water Utilities Response to Earthquake." American Water Works Association Annual Conference.
- Gilbert, J.B. and Gaston, J.M. (1989). "Pollution in the Rivers of California and Its Impact on Domestic Water Quality." International Water Supply Association Workshop on Major Continuous or Accidental Chemical Pollution of Surface Water. Paris, France.
- Gilbert, J.B. and Greenberg, A.E. (1988). "The Additives Dilemma - A Utility Perspective." American Water Works Association Annual Conference.
- Gilbert, J.B. and Carns, K.E. (1988). "Indirect Water Additives: A National Approach and a Utility's Problem." International Water Supply Meeting in Vienna, Austria.
