= Harold A. Thomas Jr. =

American geophysicist

Harold A. Thomas Jr. (1913-2002) was an American geophysicist. He was elected to the National Academy of Engineering in 1976, and won a Horton medal in 1978.
