= Haresh C. Shah =

American earthquake engineer (born 1937)

Dr. Haresh C. Shah
- Born: 7 August 1937; Godhra, Gujarat, India
- Education: University of Pune, BS; Stanford University, MS and PhD
- Spouse: Joan Dersjant Shah
- Children: 2
- Engineering career
- Discipline: structural engineering, earthquake engineering
- Practice name: Risk Management Solutions (RMS)
- Employer(s): Department of Civil Engineering, Stanford University
- Awards: Alfred E. Alquist Special Recognition Medal; George W. Housner Medal; Pingat Bakti Masyarakat

Haresh Chandulal Shah (born 1937) is an Indian-born, American earthquake engineer and the Obayashi Professor of Engineering (Emeritus) at Stanford University. He and his students performed research in probabilistic methods and the development of seismic hazard and risk models. Research and development in the area of catastrophe risk modeling led to the founding of Risk Management Solutions (RMS).

== Early life and education ==
Haresh Chandulal Shah was born in 1937 in Godhra in the state of Gujarat, India and grew up in Pune, in the state of Maharashtra. He attended G. K. H. Mandal School, and then Dastur High School. He earned a Bachelor of Science in Civil Engineering from the College of Engineering at University of Pune in 1959. He earned a Master of Science in Civil Engineering in 1960 and Doctor of Philosophy in Civil Engineering (1963) under the direction of Professor Jack R. Benjamin. His dissertation research applied probabilistic methods to evaluating the ultimate strength of reinforced concrete columns.

== Career ==
=== Academic career ===
Shah was as an assistant professor in the Department of Civil Engineering at University of Pennsylvania (1962–1968). In September 1968, Shah returned to Stanford as an associate professor in the Department of Civil Engineering, where he remained until his retirement in 1997. From 1962 to 2003 he supervised 48 PhD students.

With an endowment from John A. Blume and additional support from Stanford University, Professors Haresh Shah and James M. Gere cofounded the John A. Blume Earthquake Engineering Center in 1974 and served as co-directors until 1985. The Center's mission is to promote research and education in the area of earthquake engineering, and to transfer research findings to society in general and the engineering profession in particular.

Shah served as chair of the Civil and Environmental Engineering Department from 1985 to 1994.

=== Research and technology transfer ===
While at University of Pennsylvania (1962–1968) his research included the applications of probabilistic methods to aircraft reliability, to concrete creep, and to dynamically loaded columns and plates. At Stanford, Shah focused his research on earthquake engineering, in particular, using probabilistic methods to model and estimate earthquake damage and loss.

Shah and his students performed research in the application of probabilistic techniques to perform regional seismic hazard analyses and seismic risk analysis of large infrastructure systems. Further research produced a systematic methodology and computer program for seismic hazard analysis. In the early 1980s, Shah and his students began to apply these models to forecasting insurance losses and estimate insurance rates.

With the support of the Stanford Office of Technology Licensing, Haresh Shah, his son Hemant Shah, and a former PhD student Weimin Dong founded Risk Management Software (which later became Risk Management Solutions (RMS)). Three major catastrophe modeling companies were founded around the same time: AIR Worldwide (1987), RMS (1988), and EQECAT (1994). HAZUS, the GIS-based analysis tool used by the federal government to estimate losses from natural hazards, was developed at RMS under a contract from the National Institute of Building Sciences. The first version, HAZUS97, was released in 1997.

RMS grew to a global company with more than 12,000 employees and offices in Palo Alto, Chicago, New York, Vancouver, Toronto, London, Paris, Munich, Zurich, Delhi, Singapore, Beijing, Tokyo, Sydney, and Auckland. RMS was acquired by Moody's in 2021.

=== Professional contributions ===
International Decade for Natural Disaster Reduction (IDNDR) was established by the United Nations General Assembly on December 11, 1987. As a contribution of the International Association for Earthquake Engineering (IAEE) to IDNDR, Shah, Charles C. Thiel and Wilfred D. Iwan created the World Seismic Safety Initiative (WSSI) framework, with the goal of reducing damage and loss of life in future earthquakes, particularly in developing countries, by disseminating earthquake engineering knowledge throughout the world. Haresh Shah and Tsuneo Katayama served as co-chairs of the WSSI Interim Organizing Committee (WIOC). Projects included, SAFER Cities, which provided strong-motion accelerographs to highly seismic regions with few strong-motion monitoring instruments; the Indonesian Seismic Zoning Project; Engineering Impact of a M7.5 Earthquake in Nicoya Peninsula, Costa Rica, and the Global Risk Project. WSSI measured an increase in Earthquake Disaster Preparedness Capacity (EDPC) for 18 countries between 1993 and 1999. The WSSI was headquartered at the National Technical University in Singapore until it was dissolved in 2009.

Shah served as Senior Academic Advisor (2003–2005) to Su Guaning, President of Nanyang Technological University (NTU). and then another 12 years working on initiatives, such as the development of the Institute of Catastrophe Risk Management (ICRM) in 2010 and the development of the Earth Observatory of Singapore (EOS) in 2008. In recognition of Shah's contributions the government of Singapore awarded him the Pingat Bakti Masyarakat in 2014, and NTU awarded him an honorary doctorate in 2015.

== Professional contributions and awards ==
- Consortium of Universities for Research in Earthquake Engineering (CUREE), President 1992–1993
- John S. Bickley Founder's Award from the International Insurance Society (2000)
- Alfred E. Alquist Special Recognition Medal (2011)
- George W. Housner Medal (2013)
- Earthquake Engineering Research Institute Honorary Member
- Public Service Medal (Pingat Bakti Masyarakat), Singapore for his contributions to the Ministry of Education (2014)
- "Bharat Gaurav" award by the India International Friendship Society (IIFS) (2014)
- Honorary Doctor of Letters from Symbiosis International University, Pune, India (2014)
- Honorary Doctor of Letters from Nanyang Technological University, Singapore (2015)
- "Mahatma Gandhi Ekta Samman" by the India International Friendship Society (2016)
- International Association for Earthquake Engineering, Honorary Member

== Selected publications ==
=== Books and book chapters ===
- Andersson, B.; Shah, H.C.; Su, G.; Mayer, T. (2022). Troika!: The Remarkable Ascent Of A Great Global University, Nanyang Technological University Singapore, 2003–2017. New York: WH. Freeman and Company.
- Shah, H.C. (2009). Catastrophe Risk Management in Developing Countries and the Last Mile. in The 1755 Lisbon Earthquake: Revisited. Geotechnical, Geological, and Earthquake Engineering, vol 7. Springer, Dordrecht. The 1755 Lisbon Earthquake: Revisited
- Shah, H.C.; Dong, W.; Shah, H.H. (1990) Seismic Risk Analysis: An Insurance and Investment Analysis System, in Earthquake Damage Evaluation and Vulnerability Analysis of Building Structures, A. Koridze ed., Omega Scientific Publications.
- Shah, H.C.; Dong, W.; Boissonnade, A.C. (1987). Use of Knowledge-based Expert Systems in Seismic Hazard and Risk Analysis, in Engineering Aspects of Earthquake Phenomenon, A. Koridze ed., Omega Scientific Publications, pp. 1–16.
- Gere, J.M.; Shah, H.C. (1984). Terra Non Firma: Understanding and Preparing for Earthquakes. New Jersey: World Scientific.

=== Journal articles ===
- Shah, H.C.; Dong, W.; Stojanovski, P.; Chen, A. (2018). Evolution of seismic risk management for insurance over the past 30 years. Earthquake Engineering and Engineering Vibration, 17(1), pp.11–18.
- Davidson, R. A.; Gupta, A.; Kakhandiki, A.; Shah, H.C. (1998). Urban earthquake disaster risk assessment and management. Journal of Seismology and Earthquake Engineering, 1(1), 59–70.
- Gupta, A.; Shah, H. C. (1998). The strategy effectiveness chart: a tool for evaluating earthquake disaster mitigation strategies. Applied Geography, 18(1), 55–67.
- Dong, W.; Shah, H.C., Bao, A.; Mortgat, C.P. (1984). Utilization of geophysical information in Bayesian seismic hazard model. International Journal of Soil Dynamics and Earthquake Engineering, 3(2), 103–111.
- Kiremidjian, A.S.; Shah, H.C. (1980). Probabilistic site-dependent response spectra. Journal of the Structural Division, ASCE, 106(1), 69–86.
