= Rudolph Bonaparte =

American businessman and engineer

Rudolph (Rudy) Bonaparte is the president and CEO of Geosyntec Consultants, Inc and its specialty affiliates MMI Engineering, SiREM, and GSM Consultancy. In 2007, Dr. Bonaparte was elected to the National Academy of Engineering for contributions to geoengineering with geosynthetics, the design of landfill waste-containment systems, and leadership in geotechnical engineering practice. Dr. Bonaparte earned his B.S. (1977) from the University of Texas at Austin, a M.S. (1978) and a PhD (1981) in Civil (Geotechnical) Engineering from University of California, Berkeley. Dr. Bonaparte was Inducted to the Academy of Distinguished Alumni on November 8, 2012.

Dr. Bonaparte is the author of a number of technical papers and led a peer review team for the EPA that estimated the service life of HDPE membrane liners in landfills to be approximately 1,000 years.

== Bibliography ==
- "A Time-dependent Constitutive Model for Cohesive Soils" (1982)
- "Assessment and Recommendations for Improving the Performance of Waste Containment Systems" (2002)

== Awards ==
- 2016 American Society of Civil Engineers Outstanding Projects and Leaders (OPAL) Lifetime Achievement Award for design
- 2012 Academy of Distinguished Alumni, University of California, Berkeley Civil and Environmental Engineering
- 2007 National Academy of Engineering
- 2000 J. James Croes Medal, American Society of Civil Engineers, co-recipient
