= Kaare Høeg =

Norwegian engineer (born 1938)

Kaare Høeg (born 1938) is a Norwegian engineer.

He was born in Drammen. He took a doctoral degree at the Massachusetts Institute of Technology in 1965. He worked as a professor at Stanford University from 1968 to 1974 and director-general of the Norwegian Geotechnical Institute from 1974 to 1991. He was then a professor at the University of Oslo from 1991 to his retirement.

Høeg was elected as a member into the National Academy of Engineering in 1993 for leadership in concepts of analyses, and tests that have made possible oil production platforms in deep water with different soils. He is also a member of the Norwegian Academy of Science and Letters and the Norwegian Academy of Technological Sciences. Høeg was list among the Pioneers in Soil Mechanics: The Harvard/MIT Heritage.
