= William W-G. Yeh =

Taiwanese-American civil engineer

William W-G. Yeh (Chinese: 葉文工; pinyin: Yè Wéngōng) is a Taiwanese-American civil engineer and the Richard G. Newman AECOM Distinguished Professor of Civil Engineering, University of California, Los Angeles, a chair position that he was given in 2010. His research work has involved the development of computer models for optimal operations of large-scale hydropower and water supply systems. He is an Elected Fellow of the American Geophysical Union, Elected Fellow and Elected Honorary Member of the American Society of Civil Engineers (ASCE), Elected Member of the National Academy of Engineering and also Elected Fellow of the American Association for the Advancement of Science. He was also given the Julian Hinds Award, for his outstanding work, and also the Lifetime Achievement Award, both by the ASCE. In 2008, a symposium at UCLA honored Yeh's work. He was the editor of the ASCE's Journal of Water Resources Planning and Management from 1988 to 1993. He has authored 10 books and then also authored and co-authored 141 published papers in journals. In total, his original research has been cited more than 10,000 times.

== Education ==
He received his Bachelor of Science degree from National Cheng Kung University in 1961, his Master of Science from New Mexico State University in 1964 and his PhD from Stanford University in 1967.

== Personal ==
Professor Yeh immigrated from Taiwan to the United States in 1961. He lives in Los Angeles, and has two sons Michael Yeh, M.D., chief of the Division of Endocrine Surgery at UCLA, and Robert Yeh, M.D., director of the Richard and Susan Smith Center for Outcomes Research and section chief of interventional cardiology at Beth Israel Deaconess Medical Center. His wife Jennie Pao Yeh died in 2021.
