= Surendra P. Shah =

Indo-American civil engineer

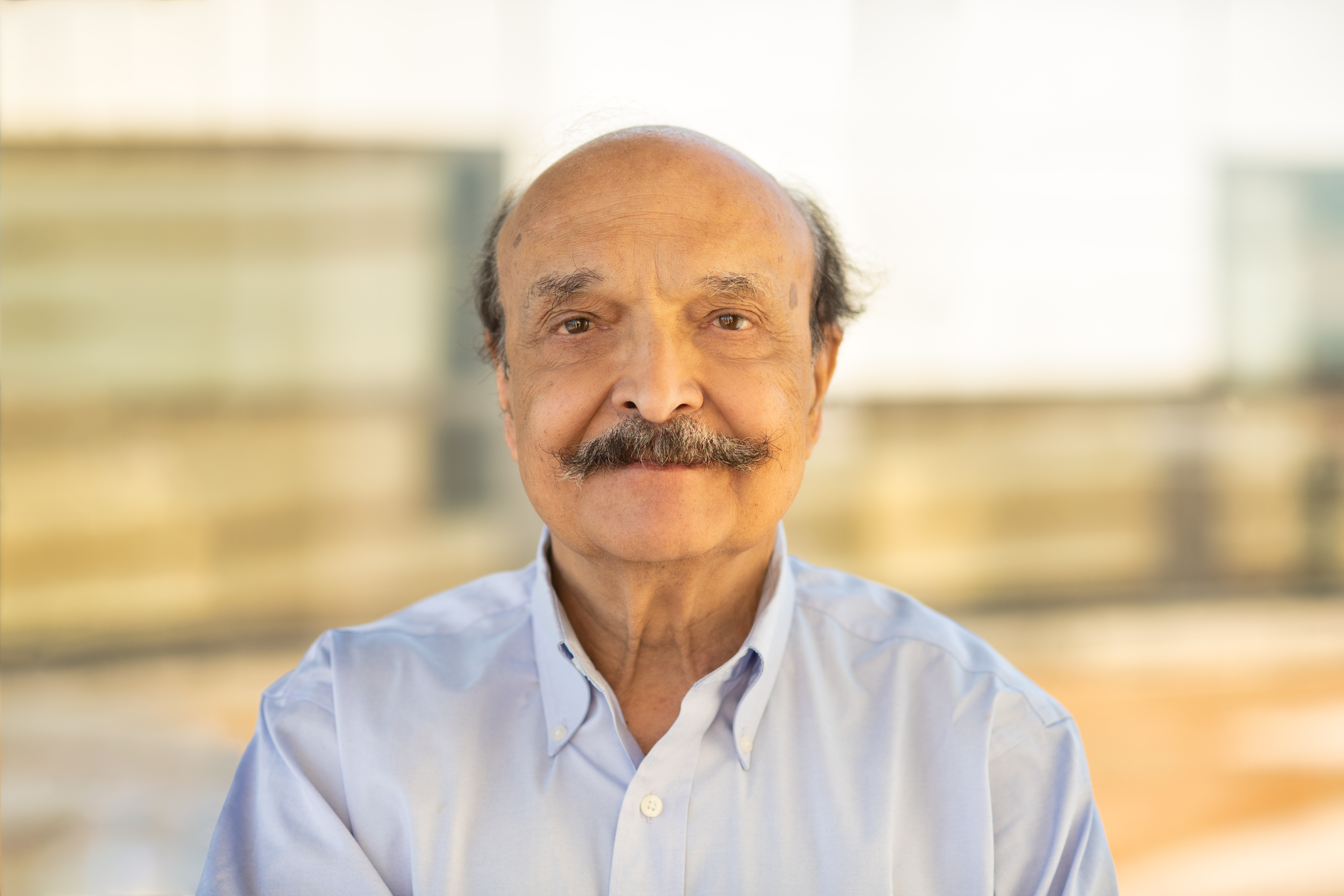
Presidential Distinguished Professor, Director, Center for Advanced Construction Materials, University of Texas at Arlington; Walter P. Murphy Emeritus Professor of Civil and Environmental Engineering, Northwestern University

Surendra Poonamchand Shah is an engineer and emeritus professor, currently at The University of Texas at Arlington, USA. Shah started his academic career and has worked in fracture, fiber reinforced composites, non-destructive evaluation, transport properties, processing, rheology, nanotechnology, and use of solid waste materials. His contributions to the fields of civil engineering and materials science have been recognized worldwide through membership and leadership in various scientific societies and universities.

== Education ==
Shah received his bachelor's degree in civil engineering from BVM Engineering College, India in 1959. He received his MSc and PhD degrees from Lehigh University in 1960 and Cornell University in 1965, respectively.

== Professional career ==
In 1966, Shah joined the faculty of the University of Illinois, where he held the role of assistant professor (1966–1969), associate professor (1969–1973), and the director of the graduate program in the Department of Materials Engineering (1973–1981). In 1981, Shah joined the faculty of Northwestern University and held various positions there. From 1981 to 2012, he was a Professor of Civil Engineering and a Walter P. Murphy Professor of Civil Engineering within the Robert R. McCormick School of Engineering and Applied Science. Also, from 1990 to 2012, he was the director of the National Science Foundation (NSF) funded Center for Advanced Cement-Based Materials. He has served as a Presidential Distinguished Professor of the Department of Civil Engineering and Materials Science Engineering at the University of Texas at Arlington since 2019. He has also held the title of Walter P. Murphy Professor Emeritus at Northwestern University since 2012.

Shah has served as a consultant for the United Nations, various government bodies, and industries across the United States, France, Switzerland, China, Denmark and the Netherlands. He has been a visiting professor at universities including Massachusetts Institute of Technology (MIT), Delft University of Technology, Technical University of Denmark, LCPC in France, The University of Sydney, and the Hong Kong University of Science and Technology. He served as a visiting scientist at NATO in 1992. In addition to this, Shah has held the post of Distinguished Professor at the Indian Institute of Technology at Madras since 2014.

He has held positions as an honorary professor at several universities including the Hong Kong Polytechnic University and Tongji University among others. He is a member of Institute of Advanced Studies at the Hong Kong University of Science and Technology. Shah has over 500 articles in scholarly journals. As an editor, he has overseen the publication of 20 books and served as editor-in-chief for the journal Materials and Structures from 2001 to 2005 and the co-author-in-chief for the journal Frontiers of Structural and Civil Engineering since 2017.

Shah was appointed as the chairman of the technical committees of the American Concrete Institute (ACI) and the International Union of Laboratories and Experts in Construction Materials, Systems and Structures (RILEM). Within the American Society of Civil Engineers (ASCE), he has served as the chairman of the technical committee, an executive committee member, and a member of the advisory board of the Engineering Mechanics Division. He is part of the committee conducting research on concrete materials for the Transportation Research Board.

== Honors and awards ==
- Elected Member, National Academy of Engineering
- Elected Member, National Academy of Inventors
- Elected Member, Chinese Academy of Engineering
- Elected Member, Indian Academy of Engineering
- Elected Member, Academy of Athens
- Elected Member, Russian Academy of Engineering
- Two-time Fulbright Lectureship Award
- Della Roy Lectureship, American Ceramic Society
- Honorary Member, American Concrete Institute
- Honorary Member, International Union of Laboratories and Experts in Construction Materials, Systems, and Structures
- Thompson Award, American Society of Testing and Materials, 1983
- Distinguished U.S. Visiting Scientist Award, Alexander Von Humboldt Foundation, 1989
- Swedish Concrete Award, 1993
- Engineering News Record Award, Newsmaker, 1995
- ASCE Charles Penkow Award, 1997
