= Sharon L. Wood =

American structural engineer

Sharon L. Wood is an American structural engineer who was formerly executive vice president and provost of the University of Texas at Austin.

== Biography ==
Wood is the descendant of three generations of civil engineers, and began her interest in engineering at age eight when she visited a construction site with her father. She graduated from the University of Virginia in 1982, and has a Ph.D. in civil engineering from the University of Illinois at Urbana–Champaign, which she earned with the support of a Tau Beta Pi fellowship.

The University of Illinois hired her as a faculty member directly after she completed her doctorate, and she remained there as a faculty member for ten years before moving to the University of Texas in 1996. She was named dean in 2014, after a year as interim dean.

She was the first woman at the university to chair the Department of Civil, Architectural and Environmental Engineering, and the first woman to become dean of engineering. Her accomplishments as dean include significantly increasing the number of women both among the faculty of the school and in its students.

== Recognition ==
She was elected to the National Academy of Engineering in 2013 "for design of reinforced concrete structures and associated seismic instrumentation for extreme loadings and environments". She is also a Fellow of the American Society of Civil Engineers, which gave her their Alfred Noble Prize in 1993 and their Outstanding Projects and Leaders (OPAL) Award in Education in 2018.

The University of Virginia named Wood their distinguished alumna for 2018. Hart Energy and their Oil and Gas Investor magazine gave Wood their Pinnacle Award in 2020.
