= Craig H. Benson =

American environmental engineer

Craig H. Benson is an American environmental engineer.

He studied civil engineering at Lehigh University and completed his master's and doctoral degrees at the University of Texas at Austin. Benson taught at the University of Wisconsin–Madison, where he was named Wisconsin Distinguished Professor of Civil & Environmental Engineering and Geological Engineering. He has served as chief editor of the Journal of Geotechnical and Geoenvironmental Engineering.

Benson was elected to membership within the United States National Academy of Engineering in 2012, "for improvements in design, construction, and monitoring of earthen liners and covers for municipal hazardous and radioactive waste landfills."

In 2015, Benson accepted an appointment as dean of the University of Virginia School of Engineering and Applied Science, as well as the Janet and John Hamilton Professorship of Civil and Environmental Engineering.

In 2018, Benson was a finalist for the University of Missouri's vacant provost position. Later that year, he was elected a fellow of the American Association for the Advancement of Science.
