= Korea Institute of Energy Technology =

South Korean national university

Coordinates: 35.011°N 126.804°E

- Established: March 2, 2022
- Location: South Korea

Korea Institute of Energy Technology (KENTECH; Korean: 한국에너지공과대학교) is a national university in Naju, South Jeolla Province, South Korea. It was established in 2022 under the Korea Institute of Energy Technology Act.

== History ==
In July 2017, the Korea's "Five-Year Plan for State Administration" included the introduction of a project aimed at establishing a university with a primary focus on energy research. On September 27, 2019, the founding general meeting of the school corporation will be held. On April 3, 2020, the Ministry of Education held the University Establishment Review Committee and granted final approval for the establishment of the Korean University of Science and Technology school corporation, marking the beginning of the university's establishment process.

In March 2021, the Korea Institute of Energy Technology Act, the basis for the establishment, was approved by the plenary session of the National Assembly, enacted in April, and enforced on May 2. The school officially opened in March 2022 with an entrance ceremony.
