= Suzanne Lacasse =

Canadian civil engineer (born 1948)

Suzanne Lacasse OC
- Born: September 22, 1948 (age 77); Rouyn-Noranda, Canada
- Education: École Polytechnique de Montréal; Massachusetts Institute of Technology
- Occupations: Civil engineer, Geotechnical engineer
- Awards: Order of Canada

Suzanne Lacasse OC (born on September 22, 1948 in Rouyn-Noranda, Québec, Canada) is a Canadian civil engineer. She obtained her PhD in 1976. She is a member of the National Engineering Academies in Canada, United States and Norway.

== Biography ==
She was one of the first women to graduate from the civil engineering program at École Polytechnique de Montréal. In 1967, she obtained a Bachelor of Engineering from the Massachusetts Institute of Technology (MIT) in the United States. She worked on the MIT faculty for 12 years before moving to Oslo, Norway.

From 1991 until 2011, she worked in Oslo as the managing director of the Norwegian Geotechnical Institute, which has been called "the largest research organization of its kind in the world."

Lacasse has contributed to the study of offshore platforms in the North Sea "under cyclic loading and has shown how theoretical and experimental information on cyclic behaviour of soils can be used in the design of such platforms".

== Selected awards and recognition ==
In 2001, Lacasse was elected as a member into the National Academy of Engineering for enlightened direction of the Norwegian Geotechnical Institute and for advancements in foundation engineering for offshore structures. She was the 2015 Rankine Lecturer, and she has received honorary doctorates from the Norwegian University of Science and Technology and from the University of Dundee. She is also a member of the Royal Norwegian Society of Sciences and Letters and the Norwegian Academy of Science and Letters. She was the 2019 winner of the Sir John Kennedy Medal of the Engineering Institute of Canada. In 2018, she was named an Officer of the Order of Canada by the Governor General of Canada.
