= Paul V. Roberts =

American environmental engineer (1938–2006)

Paul V. Roberts (November 27, 1938 - February 2006) was an American environmental engineer. He made major contributions to environmental engineering by applying fundamental principles of mass transport and chemistry to drinking water treatment and wastewater reclamation research. An author of more than 200 scientific publications, he was a member of the National Academy of Engineering and the Swiss Academy of Sciences.

== Biography ==
Paul Roberts graduated with a BS degree in chemical engineering from Princeton University in 1960, and received a Ph.D. degree in chemical engineering from Cornell University in 1966. He taught at the Universidad Católica de Valparaíso and the Universidad Técnica Federico Santa María in Chile, and worked as a process engineer with Chevron Research Company in Richmond, California. In 1968, he joined the Stanford Research Institute in Menlo Park. After he received a M.S. degree in environmental engineering at Stanford University in 1971, he joined the Swiss Federal Institute of Water Supply and Water Pollution Control. In 1976 he left his position as the head of the engineering department at the Institute and began his career at Stanford. In 1989 Roberts was named the C.L. Peck, Class of 1906 Professor in the School of Engineering. He died of leukemia in February, 2006, at his home in Cupertino.

== Major contributions ==
Paul Roberts was a pioneer in applying fundamental principles of mass transport and chemistry to engineered environmental systems. His broad body of work spans such topics as reclaimed wastewater, drinking water disinfection, adsorption and volatilization of organic contaminants during water and wastewater treatment, contaminant transport in groundwater, and multiphase flow in porous media. He is perhaps best known for conceiving and directing the first and probably the most definitive field study ever conducted on the movement and fate of hazardous chemicals in groundwater at the Borden site in Canada. In this study, his team clearly demonstrated the scientific value of carefully designed large-scale field experiments to test hypotheses, to validate mathematical models, to generate understanding of important natural processes, and to uncover still more important questions in need of better theoretical understanding.

== Awards and distinctions ==
- United States Environmental Protection Agency Scientific and Technical Achievement Award (1989)
- United States National Committee of the International Association on Water Pollution Research and Control Founders Award (1990)
- Association of Environmental Engineering and Science Professors Founders Award (2003)
- American Water Works Association Academic Achievement Award
- Elected member of the National Academy of Engineering (1997)

== Obituary ==
An obituary (page 5) in the newsletter of the Association of Environmental Engineering and Science Professors.
