= Naval Facilities Engineering Service Center =

US Navy installation in California

- Part of United States Navy

Location
- Coordinates: 34°10′00″N 119°12′30″W

The Naval Facilities Engineering Service Center (NFESC), formerly Naval Civil Engineering Laboratory (NCEL), located in Port Hueneme, California, is a center within the United States Navy that provides engineering services, technology testing, specialized facilities, and expertise in these facilities. The organization is centered on a primary customer: the United States federal government, specifically branches of the Department of Defense, the Navy, and the Marine Corps, although it does conduct business with a variety of other government and private organizations.

== Origin ==
NFESC was established October 1, 1993 from the remains of several other similar organizations, one of which was NCEL. The NFESC workforce included former NCEL employees represented by National Association of Government Employees, and unrepresented employees of other Navy entities.

== See also ==
- Naval Facilities Engineering Systems Command
- Facilities engineering
