= Lisa Alvarez-Cohen =

American microbiologist

- Education: Harvard University (BS); Stanford University (MS, PhD)
- Scientific career
- Workplaces: University of California, Berkeley
- Thesis: Cometabolic Biotransformation of Trichloroethylene and Chloroform by Methanotrophs: Experimental Studies and Modeling of Toxicity and Sorption Effects (1991)
- Doctoral advisor: Perry McCarty

Lisa Alvarez-Cohen is the vice provost for academic planning, Fred and Claire Sauer Professor at the University of California, Berkeley. She was elected a member of the National Academy of Engineering in 2010 for the discovery and application of novel microorganisms and biochemical pathways for microbial degradation of environmental contaminants. She is also a Fellow of the American Society for Microbiology.

== Early life and education ==
Alvarez-Cohen studied engineering and applied science at Harvard University and graduated in 1984. She was a postgraduate student at Stanford University, where she earned her master's degree in 1985 and a PhD in 1991.

== Research and career ==
Alvarez-Cohen works in environmental microbiology and ecology. She joined the faculty at University of California, Berkeley in 1991, and was the first woman to achieve tenure in Berkeley's Civil & Environmental Engineering Department. She is interested in species that can perform environmentally relevant functions, including studies of biotransformation and the fate of environmental water contaminants. Alvarez-Cohen uses omics based molecular tools to optimise bioremediation. Amongst other contaminants, Alvarez-Cohen's lab have studied the remediation of trichloroethene, aqueous film forming foams and arsenic:

- Trichloroethene is a contaminant that is routinely found at Superfund sites. Trichloroethene is often included on the United States Environmental Protection Agency priorities list, and is typically dechlorinated using dehalococcoides.
- Aqueous film forming foams have been used since the 1960s to extinguish hydrocarbon fuel fires. They contain perfluoroalkoxy alkanes, which can be contaminants due to their impact on human heath. Perfluoroalkoxy alkanes are known to bioaccumulate and exhibit toxicity in animals.
- Arsenic occurs regularly on the National Priorities List in various chlorinated solvents.
- Alvarez-Cohen uses anammox to remove nitrogen from wastewater. Anammox is cheaper and more efficient than conventional nitrogen sequestration. She uses stable isotope traces to study the fundamental mechanisms of anammox.

=== Academic service ===
In 2007 Alvarez-Cohen became chair for the Department of Civil and Environmental Engineering, a position she held until 2012. She has served as the diversity director of the Stanford University Engineering Research Center and elected chair of the Berkeley Division of the Academic Senate. She was appointed the vice provost for academic planning in July 2018.

Alvarez-Cohen has appeared on NPR and served on the editorial advisory board of Environmental Science & Technology. She has represented the United States at the National Academy of Engineering Frontiers of Engineering in India, Arlington County, Virginia, and Irvine, California.

== Selected publications ==
- Alvarez-Cohen, Lisa (1991-01-01). "Effects of toxicity, aeration, and reductant supply on trichloroethylene transformation by a mixed methanotrophic culture". Applied and Environmental Microbiology. 57 (1): 228–235. Bibcode:1991ApEnM..57..228A. doi:10.1128/AEM.57.1.228-235.1991. PMC 182690. PMID 2036009.
- Alvarez-Cohen, Lisa (2004-06-06). "N-Nitrosodimethylamine (NDMA) as a Drinking Water Contaminant: A Review". Environmental Engineering Science. 20 (5): 389–404. doi:10.1089/109287503768335896.
- Alvarez-Cohen, Lisa (2009). Environmental Engineering Science. Wiley. ISBN 9788126524501.

== Awards and honours ==
- 1994 W. M. Keck Foundation Award for Engineering Teaching Excellence
- 2002 Elected a fellow of the American Society for Microbiology
- 2003 Association of Environmental Engineering and Science Professors Distinguished Service Award
- 2010 Elected to the National Academy of Engineering
- 2014 American Society of Civil Engineers Simon W. Freese Environmental Engineering Award
- 2018 Association of Environmental Engineering and Science Professors Fellow

== Personal life ==
Alvarez-Cohen is married to Mike Dean Alvarez Cohen, with whom she has two children, Jason and Ryan.
