= Norwegian Geotechnical Institute =

Norwegian research centre

Coordinates: 59°56′55″N 10°43′52″E

Norwegian Geotechnical Institute (Norwegian: Norges Geotekniske Institutt, NGI) is an independent Norwegian centre for research and consultancy in engineering-related geosciences, such as the geotechnical, geological and geophysical areas. It was created in 1953 as part of The Royal Norwegian Council for Scientific and Industrial Research (Norwegian: Norges Teknisk-Naturvitenskapelige Forskningsråd) and became a private foundation in 1985.

The research is conducted within geotechnics and associated disciplines and aims to develop new methods and analysis relating to material properties, modelling and analysis, for calculation and monitoring of the underground, construction and landslides, and the extraction of North Sea oil.

NGI is also the host of the International Centre for Geohazards (ICG), one of Norway's first Centres of Excellence (CoE). NGI's partners are NORSAR, the Norwegian Geological Survey (NGU), the University of Oslo (UiO) and the Norwegian University of Science and Technology (NTNU).

DIRECTORS Laurits Bjerrum, 1951 - 1973; Kaare Høeg, 1974-1991; Suzanne Lacasse,1991-2011; Lars Andresen 2011-present
