= List of environmental awards =

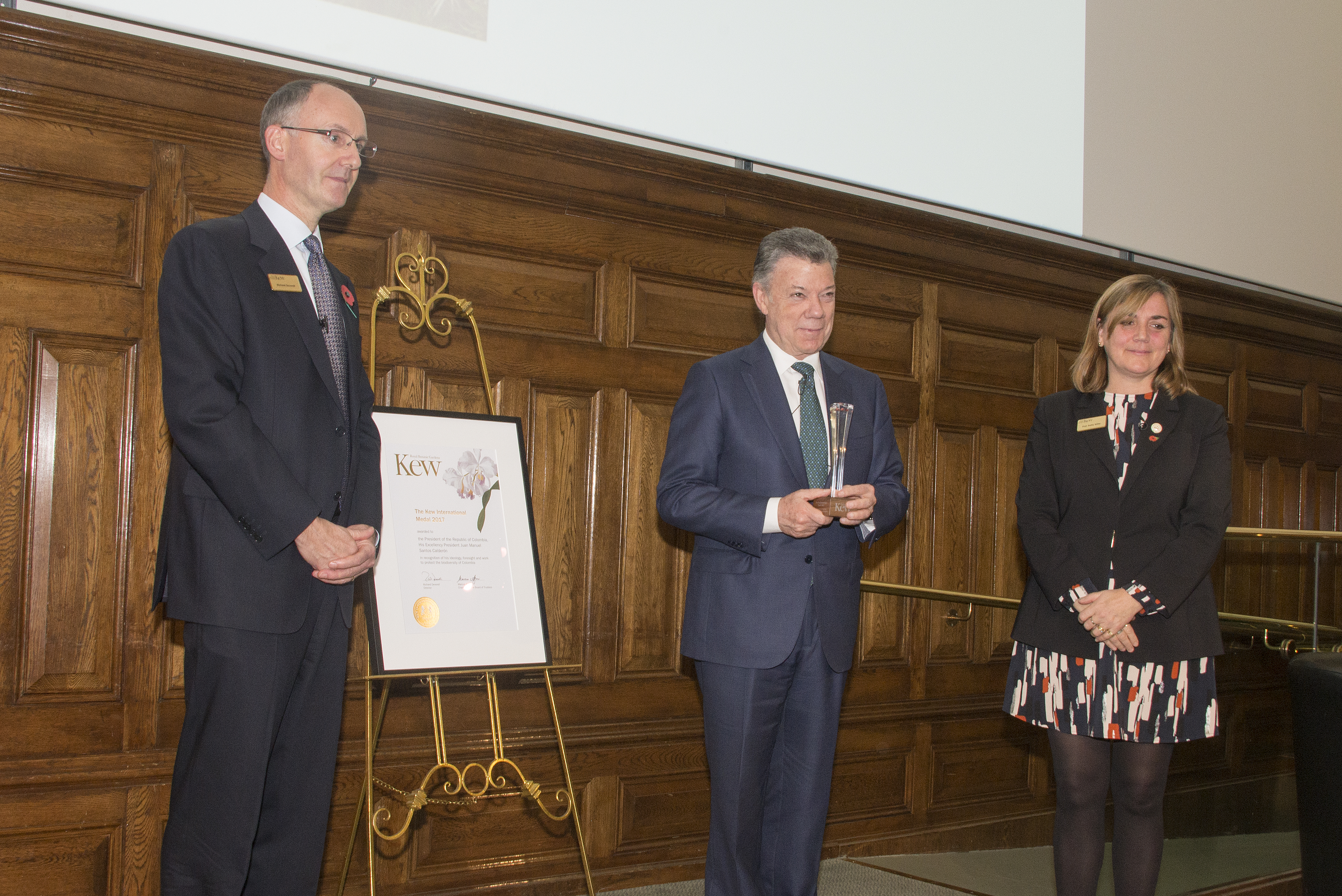
Kew International Medal awarded to Juan Manuel Santos, president of Colombia, in 2017, with Richard Deverell and Kathy Willis

This list of environmental awards is an index to articles about notable environmental awards for activities that lead to the protection of the natural environment. The list is organized by the region and country of the organization that sponsors the award. The awards may be open to the global community or limited to a particular country or field of work.

== International ==
| Country | Award | Sponsor | Notes |
|---|---|---|---|
| International | Akino Memorial Research | United Nations University | Studies in the fields of human security and sustainable development in Central Asia and neighboring regions |
| International | Burtoni Award | International Institute for Environment and Development | Outstanding contributions to the science of adaptation to climate change |
| International | Champions of the Earth | United Nations Environment Programme | Outstanding environmental leaders from the public and private sectors, and from civil society |
| International | Earthshot Prize | The Royal Foundation | Incentivizes solutions to the world's environmental problems |
| International | Edison Award | Edison Awards | Honoring excellence in innovation |
| International | Equator Prize | United Nations Development Programme | Community efforts to reduce poverty through the conservation and sustainable use of biodiversity |
| International | Forest Hero Award | United Nations | Individuals who have devoted their lives to protecting forests |
| International | Glinka World Soil Prize | Global Soil Partnership of the Food and Agriculture Organization | Direct contributions to the preservation of the environment, food security and poverty alleviation |
| International | Global 500 Roll of Honour | United Nations Environment Programme | Environmental achievements of individuals and organizations around the world |
| International | J. Paul Getty Award for Conservation Leadership | World Wide Fund for Nature | Outstanding leadership in global conservation |
| International | Ramsar Wetland Conservation Award | Ramsar Convention | Work of governments, organisations and individuals in promoting the wise use and conservation of wetlands |
| International | Sultan Qaboos Prize for Environmental Preservation | UNESCO and Sultan Qaboos Bin Said | Outstanding contributions by individuals, groups of individuals, institutes or organizations in the management or preservation of the environment |
| International | Sustainable Transport Award | Transportation Research Board | Sustainable transport |
| International | Tyler Prize for Environmental Achievement | University of Southern California | Environmental science, environmental health, and energy |
| International | World Conservation Award | World Organization of the Scout Movement, World Wide Fund for Nature | Conservation |
| International | Land for Life Award | United Nations Convention to Combat Desertification | Outstanding initiatives and innovative contributions to sustainable land management |
| International | Restoration Stewards program | Global Landscapes Forum, The Center for International Forestry Research (CIFOR) and World Agroforestry (ICRAF) | Provides funding, mentorship and training to deepen the impact of youth-led restoration projects |

== Americas ==
| Country | Award | Sponsor | Notes |
|---|---|---|---|
| Canada | Canadian Environment Awards | Government of Canada, Canadian Geographic | Dedicated Canadians who act locally to help protect, preserve and restore Canada's environment |
| Canada | Miroslaw Romanowski Medal | Royal Society of Canada | Significant contributions to the resolution of scientific aspects of environmental problems or for important improvements to the quality of an ecosystem in all aspects - terrestrial, atmospheric and aqueous - brought about by scientific means |
| Canada | 3M Environmental Innovation Award | Royal Canadian Geographical Society | Outstanding individuals in business, government, academia or community organizations whose innovative contributions to environmental change are benefiting Canada and Canadians |
| Canada | Emerald Awards | Alberta Emerald Foundation | Since 1992, the Emerald Awards have recognized and celebrated the outstanding environmental achievements of large and small businesses, individuals, nonprofits, community groups, youth, and governments across Alberta |
| United States | Ansel Adams Award | Wilderness Society | Current or former federal official who has been a fervent advocate of conservation |
| United States | Ansel Adams Award for Conservation Photography | Sierra Club | Photographers who have used their talents in conservation efforts |
| United States | Athalie Richardson Irvine Clarke Prize | National Water Research Institute | Excellence in the fields of water science and technology |
| United States | Audubon Medal | National Audubon Society | Outstanding achievement in the field of conservation and environmental protection |
| United States | Brower Youth Awards | New Leaders Initiative | Environmental and social justice leaders under the age of 23 |
| United States | Environmental Media Awards | Environmental Media Association | Best television episode or film with an environmental message |
| United States | Global Environmental Citizen Award | Harvard Medical School Center for Health and the Global Environment | Individual working to restore and protect the global environment |
| United States | Goldman Environmental Prize | Goldman Environmental Foundation | Grassroots environmental activists |
| United States | Grantham Prize | Jeremy Grantham, Hannelore Grantham, Metcalf Institute for Marine and Environmental Reporting | Journalist or a team of journalists for exemplary reporting on the environment |
| United States | Hans Hass Award | Historical Diving Society | Contributions made to the advancement of our knowledge of the ocean |
| United States | Heinz Awards | Heinz Foundations | Outstanding individuals for their innovative contributions related to the environment |
| United States | Heroes of the Environment | Time magazine | Year's most notable environmentalist |
| United States | Hodgkins Medal | Smithsonian Institution | Contributions to the understanding of the physical environment as it affects the welfare of man |
| United States | Indianapolis Prize | Indianapolis Zoo | Extraordinary contributions to conservation efforts affecting one or more animal species |
| United States | Joan Hodges Queneau Medal | National Audubon Society, American Association of Engineering Societies | Outstanding contribution by an engineer on behalf of environmental conservation |
| United States | LExEN | National Science Foundation | Funding for activities in the polar regions |
| United States | Lady Bird Johnson Environmental Award | Lyndon Baines Johnson Library and Museum | U.S. citizen, corporation or non-profit organization whose work demonstrates his or her dedication, passion for and commitment to the environment |
| United States | Parker-Gentry Award | Field Museum of Natural History | Efforts that have had a significant impact on preserving the world's natural heritage and can serve as a model to others |
| United States | Pugsley Medal | American Academy for Park and Recreation Administration | Champions of parks and conservation |
| United States | Rachel Carson Award | National Audubon Society | Women whose immense talent, expertise, and energy greatly advance conservation and the environmental movement locally and globally |
| United States | Sam Rose '58 and Julie Walters Prize | Dickinson College for Global Environmental Activism | An individual or group dedicated to preserving the planet and its resources |
| United States | Seafood Champion Awards | SeaWeb / The Ocean Foundation | Outstanding leadership in promoting environmentally responsible seafood |
| United States | Sierra Club John Muir Award | Sierra Club | Distinguished record of leadership in national conservation causes |
| United States | US Navy Environmental Protection Award Pennant | United States Department of the Navy | Navy commands for achievements in environmental quality, environmental cleanup, natural resources conservation, cultural resources management, pollution prevention, and recycling |
| United States | Distinguished Conservation Service Award | Scouting America | Service in conservation and ecology |
| United States | World Ecology Award | The Whitney R. Harris World Ecology Center | Eminent individuals who have made significant contributions to the protection of the global environment and to a better understanding of the balance between human habitation and the Earth's biodiversity |

== Asia ==
| Country | Award | Sponsor | Notes |
|---|---|---|---|
| UAE | Zayed International Prize for the Environment | Zayed International Foundation for the Environment | Various categories |
| India | Indira Priyadarshini Vrikshamitra Awards | Ministry of Environment, Forest and Climate Change | Individuals and institutions who have done pioneering and exemplary work in the field of afforestation and wasteland development |
| India | Indira Gandhi Paryavaran Puraskar | Ministry of Environment, Forest and Climate Change | Individuals and organizations who have made significant contributions toward protecting the environment |
| India | Himalayan Green Awards (HGA) | Himalayan Welfare Organization, Kashmir | Exceptional service in the fields of environmental conservation and sustainable development |
| India | VASVIK Industrial Research Award | VASVIK | Excellence in industrial research in the areas of science and technology |
| Japan | Blue Planet Prize | Asahi Glass Foundation | Outstanding efforts in scientific research or applications of science that contribute to solving global environmental problems |
| Japan | International Cosmos Prize | Expo '90 Foundation | Outstanding research work and/or achievement which promote the philosophy "The Harmonious Coexistence between Nature and Mankind" |
| Japan | Takeda Awards | Takeda Foundation | Development and promotion of the Ecological Rucksacks and Material Input per Unit Service (MIPS) concepts, as measures of the ecological stress of products and services |
| Japan | SES Environmental Science Award | Society of Environmental Science, Japan | Significant contributions to environmental science and the Society of Environmental Science in Japan |
| Japan | SES Research Award in Environmental Science | Society of Environmental Science, Japan | Outstanding achievement in the field of Environmental Science |
| Saudi Arabia | Prince Sultan bin Abdulaziz International Prize for Water | Prince Sultan Research Center for Environment, Water and Desert | Outstanding scientific contributions related to surface water, ground water, alternative (non-traditional) water resources, and water conservation |
| Singapore | President's Award for the Environment | Ministry of the Environment and Water Resources | Individuals, organizations and companies which have contributed to Singapore's efforts in achieving environmental sustainability |
| Taiwan | Tang Prize | Tang Prize Foundation | Contributions to the sustainable development of human societies, especially through groundbreaking innovations in science and technology |

== Europe ==
| Country | Award | Sponsor | Notes |
|---|---|---|---|
| Estonia | Eerik Kumari Award | Ministry of the Environment, Estonia | Those who have excelled in bioscience in Estonia |
| Europe | European Business Awards for the Environment | European Commission | Companies that combine competitiveness with respect for the environment |
| Europe | European Green Capital Award | European Commission | Cities that have a consistent record of achieving high environmental standards |
| Europe | European Solar Prize | Eurosolar | Outstanding contributions to the utilization and applications of renewable energy in all its available forms |
| Germany | Blue Planet Award | Ethecon Foundation | Actions deemed to be protecting the environment |
| Germany | Environment Prize | Bundesstiftung Umwelt | Decisive and exemplary contribution to the protection and preservation of our environment now and in the future |
| Germany | GreenTec Awards | VKP engineering GmbH | Projects, products, and people contributing to the protection of the environment |
| Germany | Nuclear-Free Future Award | Franz Moll Foundation for the Coming Generations | Anti-nuclear activists, organizations and communities |
| Germany | The National German Sustainability Award | Cabinet of Germany | Cities, companies and individuals promoting the idea of a sustainable society |
| Monaco | Prince Albert II of Monaco Foundation Awards | Prince Albert II of Monaco Foundation | Exemplary action in favour of the environment and the protection of the planet |
| Netherlands | Green Award (Inland Shipping) | Green Award Foundation | Certification program for inland vessels and river cruise ships that exceed statutory safety and environmental standards; established for seagoing ships in 1994, extended to inland vessels in 2011, and to inland passenger vessels in 2017 |
| Netherlands | Order of the Golden Ark | Kingdom of the Netherlands | Major contributions to nature conservation |
| Netherlands | Oskar Barnack Award | World Press Photo | Photography expressing the relationship between man and the environment |
| Netherlands | Sarphati Sanitation Awards | World Waternet | Contributions to global sanitation and public health, notably through entrepreneurship |
| Nordic Countries | Nordic Council Environment Prize | Nordic Council | Nordic company, organization, or individual for exemplary efforts to integrate respect for the environment into their business or work or for some other form of extraordinary initiative on behalf of the environment |
| Norway | Gunnerus Sustainability Award | Royal Norwegian Society of Sciences and Letters | Outstanding contribution to sustainable science within the fields of natural sciences, social sciences, humanities, or technological sciences |
| Norway | Heyerdahl Award | Norwegian Shipowners' Association | People from the shipping industry who have made an outstanding contribution to the environment |
| Norway | Rachel Carson Prize | Rachel Carson-prisen | Woman who has distinguished herself in outstanding work for the environment in Norway or internationally |
| Norway | Sophie Prize | Jostein Gaarder | Individuals or organizations working with the environment and sustainable development (no longer active) |
| Spain | National Environmental Award | Ministry of Environment | Environmental award (no longer active) |
| Sweden | Right Livelihood Award | Right Livelihood Award Foundation | Practical and exemplary answers to the most urgent challenges facing us today |
| Sweden | Stockholm Industry Water Award | Stockholm International Water Institute | Impressive contributions by businesses and industries to improve the world water situation |
| Sweden | Stockholm Junior Water Prize | Stockholm International Water Institute | Outstanding water project by a young person or a small group of young people |
| Sweden | Stockholm Water Prize | Stockholm International Water Institute | Outstanding achievements in water-related activities |
| Sweden | Swedish Baltic Sea Water Award | Swedish Institute | Direct and practical efforts to help improve the water environment of the Baltic Sea |
| Sweden | The Perfect World Award | The Perfect World Foundation | Awarded to a person who has raised significant attention to wildlife and nature conservation; since its inauguration in 2014, one of the most prestigious conservation awards in Scandinavia |
| Sweden | Volvo Environment Prize | Volvo Environment Prize Foundation | Individuals who explore the way to a sustainable world |
| Switzerland | Prix Pictet | Pictet Group | Photography of the highest order, applied to current social and environmental challenges |
| United Kingdom | Ashden Awards | Ashden | Organisations and businesses that deliver local, sustainable energy schemes with social, economic and environmental benefits |
| United Kingdom | Green Chemistry Award | Royal Society of Chemistry | Advances in environmentally-focused chemistry |
| United Kingdom | Green Flag Award | Ministry of Housing, Communities and Local Government | Parks and green spaces |
| United Kingdom | CIEEM Medal | Chartered Institute of Ecology and Environmental Management | Outstanding single or lifelong contribution to the field of ecology and environmental management |
| United Kingdom | John Rose Award | Institution of Environmental Sciences | Disseminate exceptional environmental research to a wide audience and fulfill its potential |
| United Kingdom | Kew International Medal | Royal Botanic Gardens, Kew | Significant contribution to science and conservation |
| United Kingdom | Marsh Award for Conservation Biology | Zoological Society of London, Marsh Charitable Trust | Contributions of fundamental science to the conservation of animal species and habitats |
| United Kingdom | Natural World Book Prize | The Wildlife Trusts | Environmental literature |
| United Kingdom | Nature of Scotland Awards | Royal Society for the Protection of Birds | Recognising the very best in Scottish nature conservation |
| United Kingdom | RSPB Medal | Royal Society for the Protection of Birds | For an individual in recognition of wild bird protection and countryside conservation |
| United Kingdom | St Andrews Prize for the Environment | University of St Andrews | Significant contributions to environmental issues and concerns |
| United Kingdom | Sustainable City Awards | City of London Corporation | Best practice in environmental management and sustainable leadership |
| United Kingdom | The British Environment and Media Awards | World Wide Fund for Nature | Professional article, programme, website or campaign, written, produced or undertaken in the UK |
| United Kingdom | Virgin Earth Challenge | Sir Richard Branson | Commercially viable design which results in the permanent removal of greenhouse gases out of the Earth's atmosphere to contribute materially in global warming avoidance |
| United Kingdom | Whitley Awards | Whitley Fund for Nature | Effective grassroots conservation leaders across the Global South |

== Oceania ==
| Country | Award | Sponsor | Notes |
|---|---|---|---|
| Australia | Froggatt Awards | Invasive Species Council | Major contribution to protecting Australia's native plants and animals, ecosystems, and people from dangerous new invasive species |
| Australia | Peter Rawlinson Award | Australian Conservation Foundation | Outstanding voluntary contribution to the Australian environment |
| Australia | World Environment Day Awards | United Nations Association of Australia | Excellence in environmental sustainability |
| New Zealand | Charles Fleming Award for Environmental Achievement | Royal Society Te Apārangi | Protection, maintenance, management, improvement or understanding of the environment, in particular the sustainable management of the New Zealand environment |
| New Zealand | Loder Cup | Minister of Conservation | New Zealanders who work to investigate, promote, retain and cherish our indigenous flora |

== See also ==
- Lists of awards
- Lists of science and technology awards
