= GreenTec Awards =

International environmental award

- Description: International environmental award honoring sustainable projects and products
- Country: Germany
- Presented by: VKP engineering GmbH

The GreenTec Awards are an international environmental award based in Germany. Founded in 2008 by the Berlin-based consultancy VKP engineering GmbH, the prize honors projects, products, and people contributing to the protection of the environment. The GreenTec Awards were formerly known as the Clean Tech Media Awards.

In 2017, Canada was the partner country of the GreenTec Awards; Norway is official partner for 2019. In 2018, the GreenTec Awards opened the IFAT, the world's biggest trade fair for environmental technologies, for the third time.

== Contest ==
The GreenTec Awards are awarded annually in varying categories. Additionally, there are "Special Prizes".

=== Certification ===
The competition of the GreenTec Awards is supervised by TÜV Nord in order to ensure fairness and transparency in the selection of the laureates. The award process received the certificate "Certified process of competition" by TÜV Nord.

=== Jury ===
Currently, a 75-member jury with independent representatives from business, media, and science chooses two of the three finalists per category – the third finalist is determined via a public online voting. In an annual jury meeting, the top three projects are presented and discussed, and the winners are chosen in a secret vote.

In 2013, the dual fluid nuclear reactor design won the public vote for the Galileo Knowledge Prize, but the award committee presiding over the awards changed the rules to exclude all nuclear designs before announcing the winner. The DFR participants successfully sued in response to this.

== Award ceremony ==
The GreenTec Awards are awarded at an annual gala event with 1000 guests from business and industry, science, politics, media, and showbiz. The event alternately takes place in Berlin and Munich and is organized in collaboration with partners from different social sectors, such as Fraunhofer, Wilo, and the Germany Association of the Automotive Industry (VDA). With music acts, media partners like Frankfurter Allgemeine Zeitung, WirtschaftsWoche and ProSieben, and a "Green Carpet", the GreenTec Awards seek to make the topic of environmental protection more appealing to the broad public.

== Laureates ==
=== Former laureates (selection) ===
==== People ====
- Dr. Auma Obama
- Bob Geldof (The Boomtown Rats)
- Clark Datchler (Johnny Hates Jazz)
- Elon Musk (Tesla)
- Morton Harket (A-ha)
- NENA
- Nico Rosberg (Formula One World Champion, 2016)
- Rea Garvey

==== Projects and products ====
- Alstom with the hydrogen train Coradia iLint
- BMW i8
- car2go
- Continental with dandelion rubber production
- JouleX
- Little Sun
- Showerloop
- Skysails

=== Current laureates ===
In 2018, there were nine categories and three special prizes:

Laureates GreenTec Awards 2018
Category	
Construction & Living	DAW SE – Sustainable Wood Care Products based on Camelina
Energy	MWK Bionik GmbH – BioSol: Efficiency-Increasing Coating for PV Plants
Lifestyle	aha Zweckverband Abfallwirtschaft Region Hannover – Hannoccino, the reusable cup
Galileo Wissenspreis	BioLab Eberswalde – Mushroom-Based Plastic Alternatives
Mobility by Schaeffler	Alstom – Hydrogen Train Coradia iLint
Resources & Recycling by Veolia	Association of Lady Entrepreneurs of India (ALEAP) – Women against Waste
Sports by Jack Wolfskin	VAUDE Sport GmbH & Co. KG – Green Shape Core Collection
Sustainable Development	Land Life Company – Cocoon: Tackling Desertification with Efficient Reforestation
Water by Wilo	Enactus Hochschule Bochum – Greenhouse with Integrated Water Production
Special Prize Start-up	Fresh Energy GmbH – Smart Meters for Less Power Consumption
Special Prize Entrepreneur of the Year	Nico Rosberg
Special Prize IFAT Environmental Leadership Award	Dr. Auma Obama

== See also ==
- Bright green environmentalism
- Eco-innovation
- Ecological modernization
- Ecotechnology
- Environmental technology
- Green development
- List of environmental awards
