= Zabeer Zarif Akhter =

Bangladeshi researcher

- জাবীর জারিফ আখতার
- Zabeer in 2025 at NASA Headquarters
- Born: May 27, 2007 (age 19); Chapai Nawabganj, Bangladesh
- Citizenship: Bangladeshi
- Education: St. Joseph Higher Secondary School; Bogura Cantonment Public School and College
- Scientific career
- Fields: Water sustainability Artificial Intelligence; Space Science

Zabeer Zarif Akhter (born: 27 May 2007) is a Bangladeshi researcher, innovator and young scientist, who primarily works with water sustainability, artificial intelligence and space science. At present, he serves as a Research & Technology Lead for the NASA GLEE (Great Lunar Expedition for Everyone) Mission, and is a Research Fellow at KTH Royal Institute of Technology, Sweden and a Research Assistant at Bangladesh University of Engineering and Technology (BUET).

== Early life and education ==
Zabeer Zarif Akhter was born on 27 May 2007, in the Chapai Nawabganj district of Bangladesh. His paternal residence is at Shibganj Upazila of Chapai Nawabganj district.

Zabeer completed his high school from Bogura Cantonment Public School and College, from where he passed SSC in 2023. Later he got admitted at St. Joseph Higher Secondary School and passed HSC from this college in 2025.

== Career ==
=== NASA GLEE Mission (Team Bangladesh) ===
Zabeer's first international recognition came with being selected in the Bangladesh team of NASA GLEE (Great Lunar Expedition for Everyone) Mission in 2022. At present he is serving as a Research & Technology Lead of the Engineering Division for this team.

=== Stockholm Junior Water Prize Bangladesh ===
Zabeer achieved the national title of Stockholm Junior Water Prize Bangladesh in two consecutive years in 2024 and 2025, representing Bangladesh at the global finals of the competition. This remarked his beginning in the research of water sustainability and purification.

=== Water purifier from e-waste ===
Zabeer representing Bangladesh at World Water Week 2024, Stockholm, Sweden

While participating in the Stockholm Junior Water Prize 2024, Zabeer invented a water purification system using High Voltage Plasma, ultraviolet radiation and ozone sterilisation, which removes pathogens like E. coli, TC, and FC bacteriophage from the polluted water. This prototype mainly transforms contaminated water into a plasma stream, effectively eradicating pathogens through a dual approach involving ultraviolet radiation and plasma sterilisation. A notable feature of this process is its ability to occur without a significant increase in temperature, a phenomenon known as non-thermal plasma. It only needs two carbon electrodes along with the circuit. The circuit can create an atmospheric pressure plasma.

This straightforward method is suitable for individual use, which effectively eradicates all bacteria (E. coli, TC, and FC) and microorganisms present in the water. This invention was awarded the national title of Stockholm Junior Water Prize Bangladesh in 2024. The primary objective of this innovation is to address and mitigate the pervasive issue of water pollution caused by the unregulated discharge of industrial and domestic waste.

All the components used in this process, including batteries and others parts, are collected from electronic waste, such as three-wheeler motor driver circuit parts, old CRT TV materials, abandoned laptops, and mobile lithium batteries. The invention is also solar-powered, which makes it more sustainable.

This water purification system, crafted from recycled electronic waste, aims not only to tackle water pollution and waterborne diseases, but also promoting environmental responsibility. In a country like Bangladesh (Zabeer's motherland), where frequent floods pose a significant threat to public health, this invention can help the flood affected regions to ensure safe drinking water during the monsoon and tackle waterborne diseases.

=== Genius Olympiad 2025 ===
Zabeer, along with his teammate Twashin Ilahi, achieved bronze award at the Genius Olympiad organised by Rochester Institute of Technology (RIT) in New York in 2025. His previous signature project Plasma Water Purifier brought this honor to him, which also presented Bangladesh on the global stage.

=== CERN-Solvay Student Camp ===
Following his success at several international science competitions, Zabeer got a chance to attend the CERN-Solvay student camp at Geneva, Switzerland, from April 19 to April 25, 2026. In this one-week residential experience, participants visit research facilities, take part in guided experiments and engage with leading scientists at the world's largest particle physics laboratory, the European Organization for Nuclear Research (CERN), in Geneva.

=== Professional career ===
At present, Zabeer is serving as a Research Fellow at KTH Royal Institute of Technology, Sweden and a Research Assistant at Bangladesh University of Engineering and Technology (BUET). He also serves as the Research & Technology Lead for the NASA GLEE (Great Lunar Expedition for Everyone) Mission and contributes to initiatives related to NASA’s Artemis program. His work has also been recognized by UNICEF Innovation Hub, Yahoo Tech etc.
