= Bogura Cantonment Public School and College =

Educational institution in Bogra, Bangladesh

- বগুড়া ক্যান্টনমেন্ট পাবলিক স্কুল ও কলেজ

Location
- Bogura Cantonment, Bogura 5801; Bangladesh; 24.7604°N 89.3961°E

Information
- Type: Non-government
- Motto: رب زدنى علما (O Lord, give me wisdom)
- Established: 1979; 47 years ago
- Founder: Ziaur Rahman
- School board: Board of Intermediate and Secondary Education, Rajshahi
- Chairman: Md Bellal Ahmed
- Principal: Md Mokkel Rana
- Teaching staff: 177
- Employees: 168
- Grades: SSC, HSC
- Gender: Male, Female
- Enrollment: 6000+
- Language: Bengali, English
- Campus size: 17 acres
- Colors: School Branch: White Sky Blue; Navy Blue; College Branch: White Grey; Navy Blue
- Nickname: BCPSC
- Yearbook: প্রতিভা
- Affiliation: Bangladesh Army
- EIIN: 119251
- School Code: 4350
- College Code: 4500
- Website: bcpsc.edu.bd

Bogura Cantonment Public School and College (Bengali: বগুড়া ক্যান্টনমেন্ট পাবলিক স্কুল ও কলেজ) is an educational institution located at Shajahanpur upazila of Bogura district in Bangladesh. It was established in 1979 by the then president of Bangladesh, Ziaur Rahman.

As of 2019, it has a student body of 6,130. It has been identified as one of the top institutions under Rajshahi Education Board several times in the previous years.

== Academic activities ==
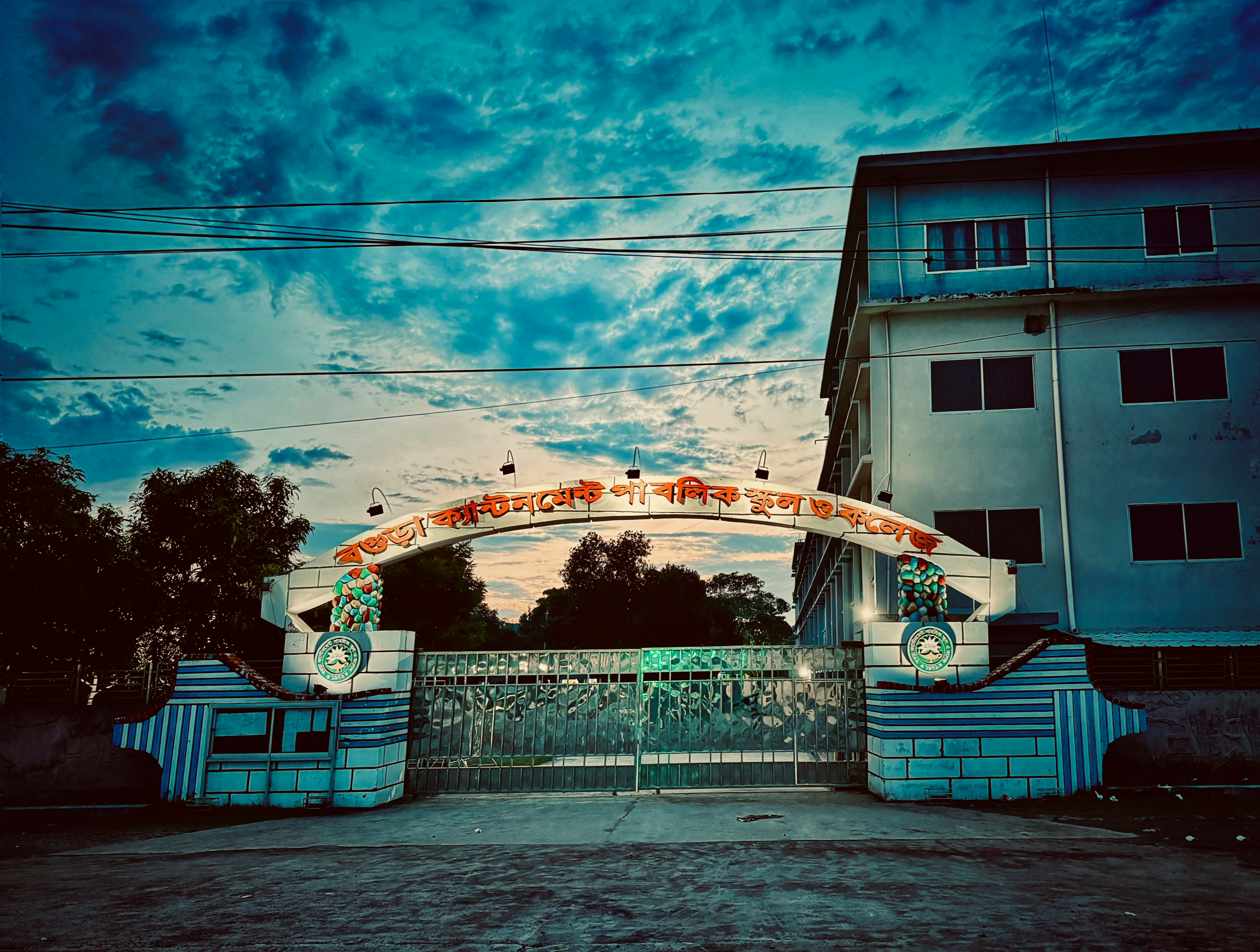
Main entrance of BCPSC

Major General S M Asadul Haque, ndc, psc, general officer commanding of 7th Infantry Division and Bogura Area Commander, is currently the chief patron of the institution. Besides, the commander of 111 Infantry Brigade, Md Raju Ahmed is the chairman of the and Md Masud Rana is serving as the principal.

== Co-curricular activities ==
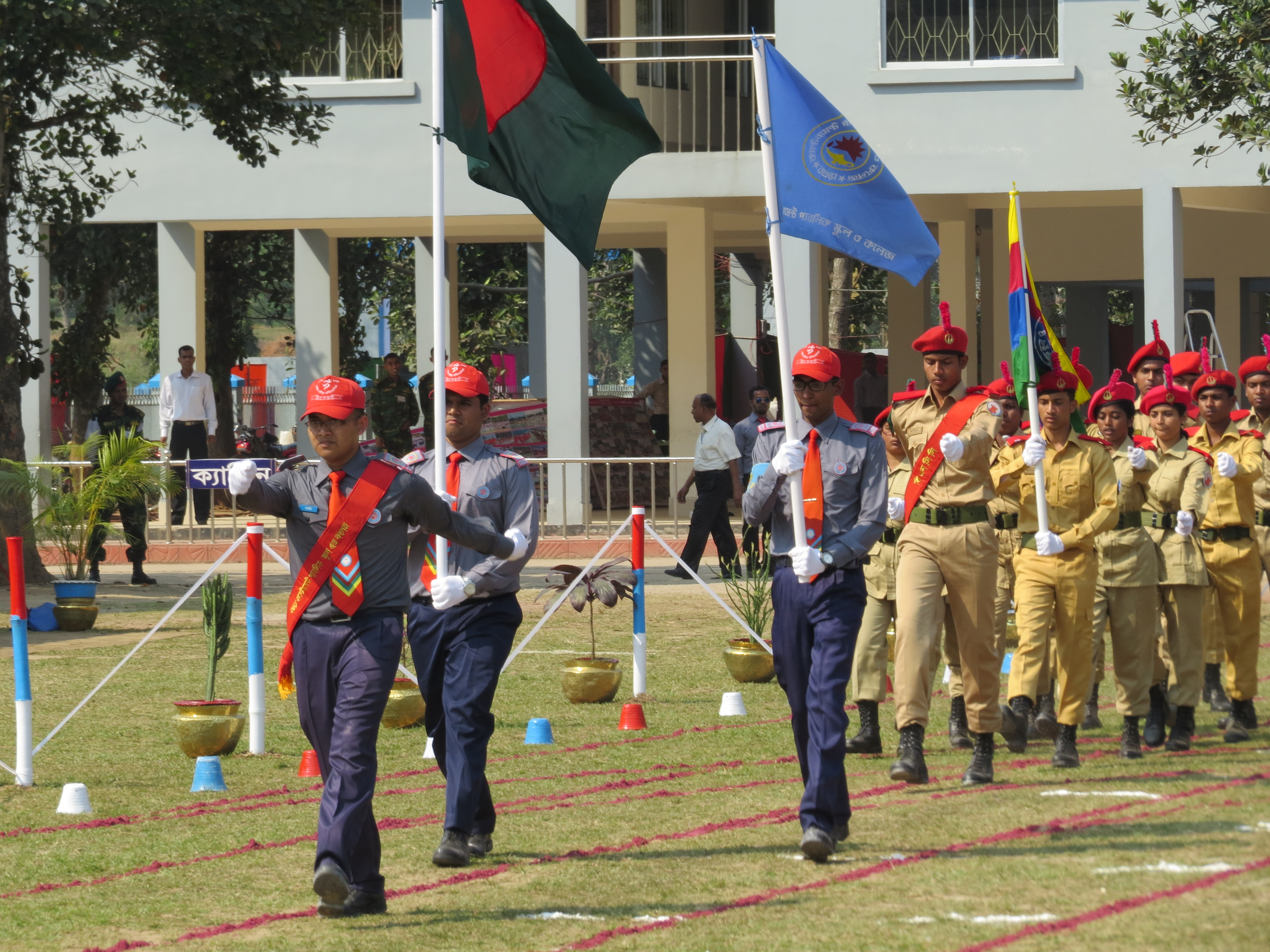
Annual Sports March-past

For the co-curricular activities of the institution, there are various clubs such as Debate, General Knowledge, Math Olympiad, Science Club, Language Club, Taekwondo, Handwriting, Painting, Public Speaking, Dance, Singing, Poetry Recitation etc.

Though these co-curricular activities are held very rarely and half of the co-curricular activities are abandoned by the school as of 2026.

== Achievements ==
In the year 2024, the school branch of this institution was ranked 1st as Best School and the college branch was ranked 2nd as 1st Runner-up among all cantonment public schools and colleges.

In addition, the school branch secured the 1st position as Best School and the college branch secured the 2nd position as 1st Runner-up in the years 2020 and 2019 previously.

In 2021, two students of Bogura Cantonment Public School and College, Md. Oman Zafar and Sneha Mahjabin, won the first and second prizes in the World Quiz Competition of the International Virtual Debate Festival, held in Bangladesh and organised by National Debate Federation Bangladesh (NDFBD). Md. Noman Zafar and Sneha Mahjabin secured the first and second position among 400 students from 36 countries of the world respectively.

Shajedur Rahman Shahed, who was selected as the Best Banglabid in the 3rd season of the Ispahani Mirzapore Banglabid competition, aired on Channel i in 2019, was a student of this institution.

In the year 2022, in the International Talent Hunt Competition organized by NASA (a part of the NASA Artemis Program), Zabeer Zarif Akhter, a student of the institution, got the opportunity of training and scholarship in the United States by winning the 1st place among the entire Bangladesh and 38th position internationally. He was also the global finalist in the 'Stockholm Junior Water Prize' competition in 2024 and 2025 two consecutive year.

In 2024, a team of young students from Bogura Cantonment Public School and College achieved the 1st place in the school-based quiz competition Sobjanta, aired on Duronto TV. They achieved the winners' title by defeating Holycross Girls' High School in the final.

In public exams like JSC, SSC and HSC examinations, the institution has stood first in 'Rajshahi Education Board' several times. In the recent SSC and HSC examinations in 2024 the institution has a result of 100% pass with 26.96 and 1.26 A+ grades respectively.

== Notable alumni ==
- Mohammad Rafiqul Islam, Vice Chancellor, Islamic University of Technology
- Zabeer Zarif Akhter, Researcher & Scientist
- Zinia Zafrin Luipa, Singer

== Gallery ==
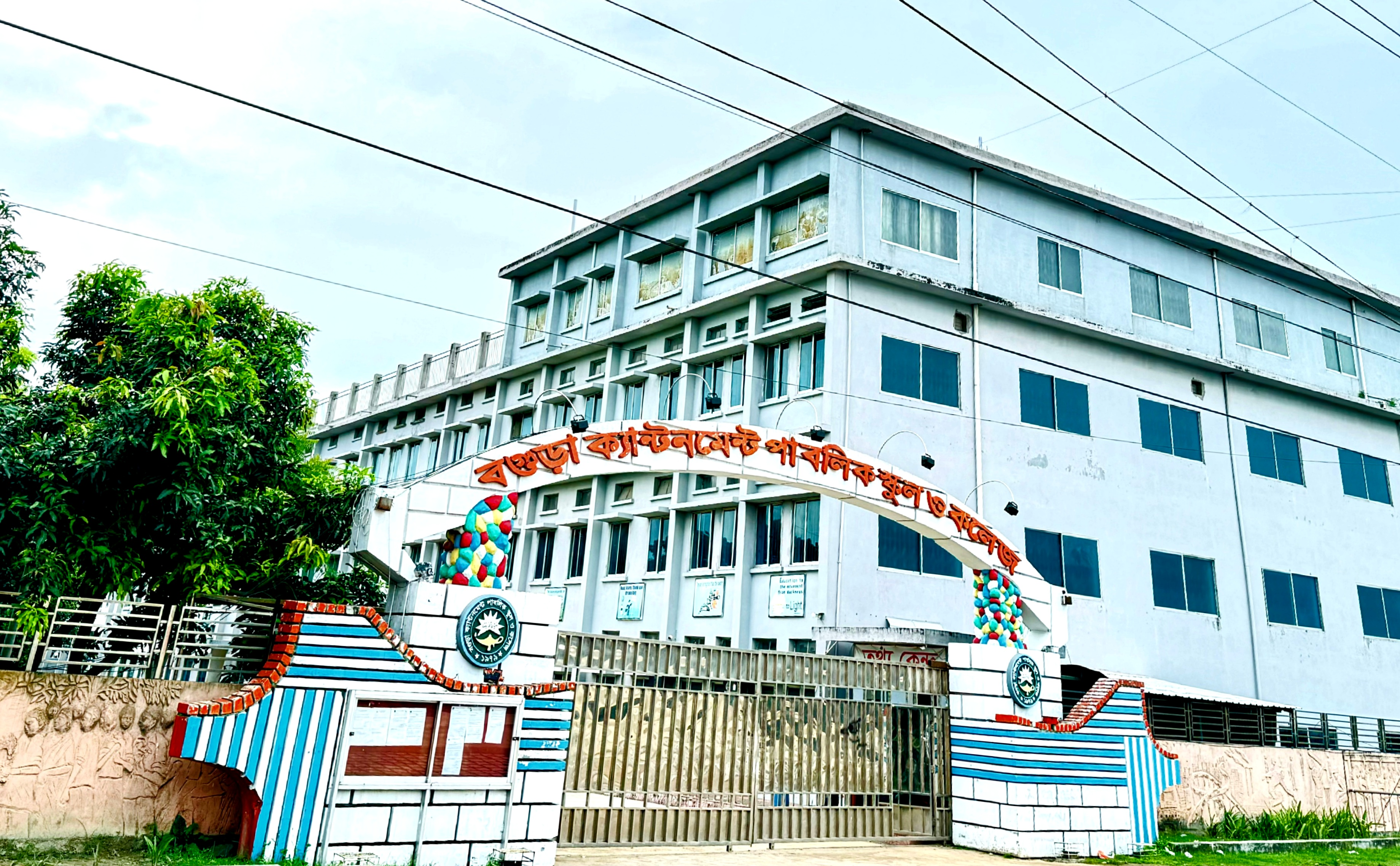
Main Gate

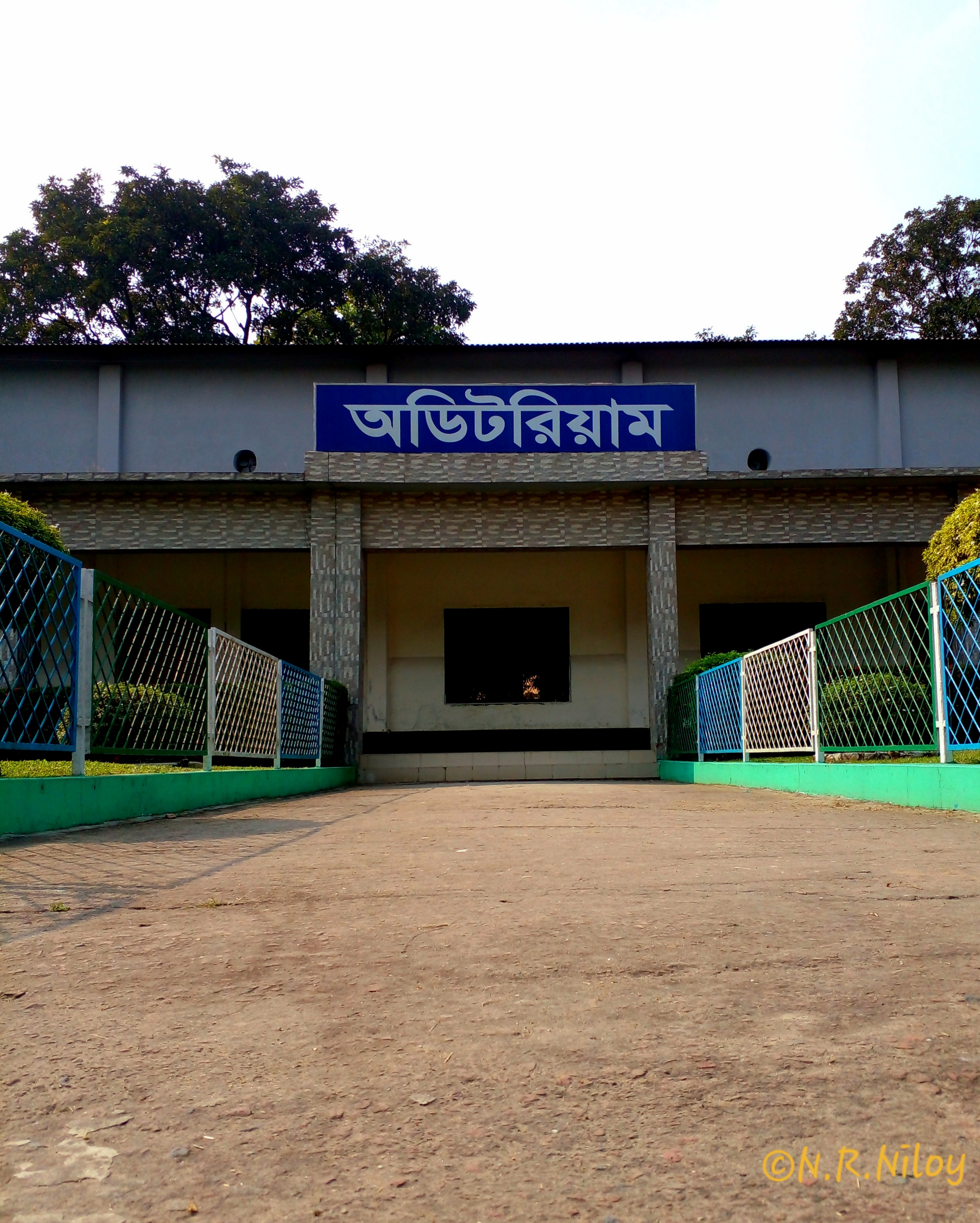
Auditorium
