= Swedish Baltic Sea Water Award =

The Swedish Baltic Sea Water Award was a regional award by the Swedish Ministry for Foreign Affairs now discontinued. It had been administrated by Stockholm International Water Institute (SIWI) till 2010 and later handed over to the Swedish Institute (SI). Established in 1999 by the Swedish Ministry for Foreign Affairs, the award recognised direct and practical efforts by individuals, corporations, non-governmental organisations and municipalities to help improve the water environment of the Baltic Sea. Currently Swedish Institute operates "Cooperation in the Baltic Sea region" by providing Swedish organisations with funding, useful advice and help in finding partners in collaborating countries.

Up till 2010, the award had been presented each August during the World Water Week in Stockholm. The winner received a SEK 250,000 prize sum, a crystal sculpture, and travel and accommodation to participate at the World Water Week in Stockholm .

== Past winners ==
2010 Prof. Maciej Nowicki and Prof. Marek Gromiec, Poland In recognition of their respective efforts to reduce the Polish nutrient loads to the Baltic Sea.

2009 Helsinki Commission (HELCOM), Finland HELCOM works to protect the marine environment of the Baltic Sea from all sources of pollution through intergovernmental co-operation between Denmark, Estonia, the European Community, Finland, Germany, Latvia, Lithuania, Poland, Russia and Sweden. HELCOM is governing the "Convention on the Protection of the Marine Environment of the Baltic Sea Area" (the Helsinki Convention) and has shown exemplary commitment to improving the Baltic Sea through the adoption of the Baltic Sea Action Plan.

2008 Prof. Krzysztof Edward Skóra, Hel Marine Station at the University of Gdańsk, Poland Professor Skóra received the award for his research which exposes the impacts of new invasive species on the sensitive coastal water ecosystems in Poland. Among Professor Skóras achievements is also the establishment of the Hel Marine Station at the University of Gdansk. The marine station generates, facilitates and spreads research on the ecology of fish and marine mammals and the protection of rare species in the Baltic. It also educates and engages the public through study visits, specialist courses and seminars.

2007 Ecodefense, Kaliningrad, Russia Ecodefense received the award for its efforts to increase knowledge on and awareness of the Baltic Sea water environment. One of the most notable successes has been the "Clean Rivers – Clean Baltic Sea” campaign. Since 1999, this Ecodefense effort has aimed to protect water resources, limit pollution of the water system from the industry, and educate young people and teachers in Kaliningrad. This has involved, among other things, education and broadening of knowledge among the general public, government departments, authorities, politicians and companies by means of reports, hearings and campaigns in a region with severe environmental problems.

2006 Mr. Björn Carlson, Sweden Björn Carlson received the award for his contributions to the Baltic Sea marine environment. His efforts included donating 500 million Swedish kronor to establish the Baltic Sea Foundation, appointing The Royal Swedish Academy of Sciences as trustee to oversee the foundation's scientific initiatives. The donation was intended to support new methods and unconventional measures by regional policy-makers, organization, and industry stakeholders to improve marine environmental quality across the Baltic Sea region.

2005 Vodokanal St. Petersburg and its General Director, Mr. Felix Karmazinov Vodokanal, which is the municipal water utility for St. Petersburg, and Mr. Karmazinov have been the driving forces behind completion of the Southwest Wastewater Treatment Plant (SWTP), which will be inaugurated in September 2005. Once it does, 1.5 million citizens of the city will no longer on a daily basis send 330,000 cubic metres of untreated wastewater – enough to fill 330 Olympic-size swimming pools – straight into the Neva River and from there, the Gulf of Finland and thus the Baltic Sea.

2004 Nature Management and Water Environment Division of Fyn County, Denmark The Nature Management and Water Environment Division of Fyn County, Denmark, received the award for its monitoring and analysis of the water environment and pollution discharge and long-term efforts that have laid the foundation for cost effective point and non-point source pollution prevention measures in pursuit of an improved Baltic Sea marine environment.

2003 Frantschach Swiecie SA, Poland Frantschach Swiecie SA, a pulp and paper industry in Poland, received the award for contributions which have had a clear and positive effect on the environment and the Baltic Sea. Through facility improvements utilising best available technologies (BATs), Frantschach Swiecie achieved considerable reduction in pollutants discharged to the Vistula River and the Baltic Sea.

2002 The Lithuanian Housing and Urban Development Foundation The Lithuanian Housing and Urban Development Foundation was honored for its innovative programs and projects that have contributed to a considerable reduction of Lithuania’s organic pollution to the Baltic Sea. The overall approach can serve as a model for other regions in the Baltic Sea area.

2001 Mr. Leonid Korovin from St. Petersburg, Russia Mr. Korvin was honored for his commendable contribution to the development of a series of activities aiming to safeguard the water environment in the part of the Baltic Sea nearest to the St. Petersburg area, which emits very large amounts of pollutants into the Baltic Sea.

2000 The City of Gdansk, Poland The City of Gdansk was honored for being the driving force behind the establishment of the Wschod wastewater treatment works, which receives and cleans wastewater from Gdansk and four other Polish cities and populated areas. The Wschod works has had a very clear, positive effect on the water quality in the Bay of Gdansk, a part of the Baltic Sea.

1999 PURAC of Poland PURAC of Poland won the first Swedish Baltic Sea Water Award by building several new, advanced wastewater and water treatment plants along major rivers running into the Baltic Sea. These projects have helped to improve the marine environment in the Baltic Sea.

== See also ==
- List of environmental awards
