= Prince Albert II of Monaco Foundation =

Environmental charity

- Founded: 2006
- Founder: Prince Albert II of Monaco
- Type: Non-profit
- Purpose: Biodiversity, Sustainable Development, Environmental Protection
- Headquarters: Saint Michel, Monaco
- Website: www.fpa2.org

The Prince Albert II Foundation (Official name: Fondation Prince Albert II de Monaco) is a Monaco-based charity which has donated millions in various environmental projects. The foundation was initially created in 2006 by Prince Albert II of Monaco and it concentrates on environmental protection, sustainable development, climate change and the promotion of renewable energies as well as biodiversity. The foundation supports also projects which develop water resource management or desertification control technologies.

The foundation is part of the Foundations Platform F20, a global network of foundations and philanthropic organizations.

== Background ==
In 1906, Prince Albert I, a pioneer in oceanography who paved the way as far as environment protection is concerned, explored the unknown regions of Spitsbergen. In harsh weather conditions, the Prince and scientists aboard his vessel made an inventory of marine life and took meteorological readings and photographs in order to study the movements of the sea ice and glaciers. In 2006, Prince Albert II of Monaco, in the footsteps of his great-great-grandfather, visited the Arctic, reaching the North Pole on 16 April so that he could assess the effects of global warming on the weakening ice. Following this expedition, the Prince decided to create a foundation dedicated to environmental protection.

== Purpose ==
The foundation has set itself into three specific goals:

To form partnerships in order to conduct projects in its priority areas for action. To raise the awareness of the population and public authorities regarding the impact of human activities on the natural environment in order to encourage more environmentally friendly behaviour. To promote outstanding initiatives and innovative solutions, in particular by awarding prizes and grants.

== Geographical areas of activity ==
The foundation implements a wide range of projects in its three priority geographical areas of activity.

The Mediterranean Basin is a natural priority area due to the geographical location of the Principality. The foundation is keen to take action with the players concerned, in order to preserve the wealth of the marine and land ecosystems, to curb the extinction of the most endangered species and to develop access to water resources. The Polar Regions, privileged witnesses to the world environment. The effects of global warming, pollution, the extinction of species and the threats to the indigenous people are considerable. The Least Developed Countries, particularly exposed to major environmental issues, are affected by desertification, water scarcity and deforestation. The foundation devotes part of its efforts to these countries not only to find a solution to these scourges, but also to contribute towards their action in support of sustainable development.

== Projects ==
The foundation is involved in various projects such as:

=== Saving of the Bluefin Tuna ===
On the initiative of its president, Prince Albert II, the Prince Albert II of Monaco Foundation and the WWF set up a partnership in January 2008 to take action with a view to saving the bluefin tuna from ecological extinction. Since 2008, a large number of restaurant owners in the Principality of Monaco have responded to the appeal jointly launched by the Prince Albert II Foundation and the MC2D association to stop serving bluefin tuna, and thus raise awareness of the need to save this symbolic species of the Mediterranean, while there is still time. Consequently, a moratorium has been implemented in cooperation with food retailers and professionals and Monaco has become the first “bluefin tuna free” country. Since then, many other countries have followed suit. Monaco's government departments, supported by the Prince Albert II of Monaco Foundation, subsequently initiated a procedure to add the bluefin tuna to Appendix I of CITES (Convention on the international trade in endangered species of wild fauna and flora). For many months, the listing, which would have resulted in the ban on international trade of this fish, has been the topic of debate in several countries. On 3 March 2010 during the Doha Conference, the Obama administration announced that it was in favor of adding the bluefin tuna to appendix I of CITES. The European Union officially endorsed this decision on 10 March by announcing that it would vote in favor of this listing. Despite such support, the Doha Conference rejected Monaco's proposal on 18 March. Japan, the main consumer of thunnus thynnus, in addition to the developing countries, was strongly opposed to the ban. However, this is the first time that a debate on the preservation of an endangered species has made the headlines of the international press.

=== Foundations for the Mediterranean Meeting ===
The Prince Albert II of Monaco Foundation organizes international meetings between foundations involved in environmental issues and their impact on the people and companies of the Mediterranean. The event brings together a hundred or so participants including over 40 international foundations and NGOs working on environmental issues and sustainable development in the Mediterranean. The aim is to create a forum to promote dialogue between the heads of these foundations, making it possible for them to expand their scope of activity, whilst at the same time fostering new partnerships and developing new networks.

=== Monaco makes a commitment against deforestation ===
The MC2D association, with the support of the Prince Albert II of Monaco Foundation, has decided to launch a campaign, in Monaco, to promote the use of wood harvested from sustainably managed forests. This campaign is entitled “Monaco makes a commitment against deforestation”. Deforestation of the tropical rainforests accounts for more than 20% of greenhouse gas emissions and moreover leads to soil degradation, loss of biodiversity and the exclusion of the local populations. One of the most effective ways of combating this scourge is to give these forests an economic value through the development of sustainable management. Such management enables us to target certain species of tree and of a certain age only, whilst at the same time respecting biodiversity-rich areas and the people living there. Rational forestry practice enables forest regeneration and generates economic value for the parties concerned, foresters and the indigenous people alike. One of the concrete catalysts for change resides in the production, marketing and utilisation of certified wood under the FSC (Forest Stewardship Council) label, which is currently the most important forest certification label for the tropical rainforests. With this initiative, the Principality aims to set an example for the protection of the tropical rainforests and the fight against global warming.

== Media events ==
- Polar Expedition

On 5 January 2009, the Prince set off on a second 17-day polar expedition to Antarctica travelling from the West to the East. Initiated on the invitation of the international scientific community, Prince Albert II's 2009 Antarctic mission had three main objectives:

1. To alert international public opinion on the dangers of global warming and urge everyone to reduce their greenhouse gas emissions,
2. To promote scientific research in the Polar regions by lending support to the men and women working there,
3. To bring attention to article 2 of the Madrid protocol to the Antarctic Treaty, which entered into force on 14 January 1998, and which stipulates that “the Antarctic is a natural reserve devoted to peace and science”.
- Exhibitions focused on the environment

The Prince Albert II of Monaco Foundation is the instigator of many exhibitions focused on the environment.

1. Jane Goodall: Face To Face
2. Laurent Ballesta: Planète Mers
3. Vinaj, Robion, Gouron: Nos Montagnes
4. Jacques Perrin and Jacques Cluzaud: Oceans
5. Thierry Bisch: "Delete?"
- The Prince Albert II of Monaco Foundation Awards

Since 2008, the prince has presented awards to key figures for their exemplary action in favour of the environment and the protection of the planet, in each of the foundation's three priority fields of activity: climate change, the preservation of biodiversity, access to water and the fight against desertification. “I wanted to create these Awards to lend my support to the exceptional women and men who have made a personal commitment to save our planet.” declared the Prince at the first edition of the event.

Prizewinners have been:

- 2008: Alain Hubert, Jane Goodall and Sunita Narain
- 2009: Edward Osborne Wilson, Marine Silva and Pan Yue
- 2010: James Lovelock, Peter Hamilton Raven and Malin Falkenmark
- 2011: Gretchen Daily, Andràs Szollosi-Nagy and David Suzuki
- 2012: Jean Jouzel, Sir David Attenborough and the Stockholm International Water Institute (SIWI)
- 2013 International Council for Science (ICSU); the Scientific Committee on Antarctic Research (SCAR); John Antony Allan and Jane Lubchenco
- 2014: Ove Hoegh-Guldberg (Climate Change award)); International Union for Conservation of Nature (IUCN) Red List of Threatened Species (Biodiversity award); Ma Jun (Water award)
- 2015: Bill McKibben (Climate Change award);Emmanuel de Merode (Biodiversity award); Loic Fouchon (Water award)
- 2016: Laurance Tubiana (Climate Change award);Luc Hoffman (Biodiversity award); South African Water Research Commission (Water award)

== Organization ==
The Prince Albert II of Monaco consists of a board of directors, an executive board, a scientific and technical committee, an ethics commission and a development committee.

=== Board of directors ===
The board of directors ensures that the foundation's goals are achieved by taking all the measures necessary. It is entrusted with:

1. Ensuring that all the foundation's goals are taken into consideration,
2. Enacting the general principles and provisions necessary for the foundation's activity,
3. Establishing and evaluating the annual action program,
4. Managing the budget.

=== Executive board ===
The foundation has an executive board composed of a president, a vice president, a secretary general, a treasurer and two administrators nominated by the board of directors. The purpose of the executive board is to supervise the foundation's activities. It administers day-to-day business and implements the decisions of the board of directors.

=== Scientific and technical committee ===
The scientific and technical committee ensures that the foundation's positioning is transcendent, and furnishes its expertise when selecting projects to be supported by the foundation. It is entrusted with:

1. Ensuring scientific and technical monitoring in conjunction with its network of partners.
2. Establishing requests for proposals and taking part in the project selection process.
3. Organizing leadership processes for project managers and project evaluation.

=== Ethics commission ===
The ethics commission provides the guarantee that all the foundation's activities respect the basic values of the foundation and the ethical requirements that any organization of public interest managing capital flow has to fulfil. It is entrusted with:

1. Defining the foundation's priorities based on universal ethical values.
2. Taking part in the evaluation of the action programme.

=== Development committee ===
The development committee helps to raise the financial resources necessary to develop the foundation's action programme and to ensure its sustainability. It is entrusted with organising and managing an international fundraising network.

== See also ==
- List of environmental awards
