= Macinley Butson =

Inventor and scientist

- Education: The Illawarra Grammar School
- Awards: Stockholm Junior Water Prize (2019) NSW Young Australian of the Year (2018)
- Website: www.macinleybutson.com

Macinley Butson is an inventor and scientist who won the 2018 NSW Young Australian of the Year and 2019 Stockholm Junior Water Prize. Their (Note: Butson uses they/them pronouns.) recognition include the InStyle 2019 Woman of Style and Next-Gen Award, and the 2019 Marie Claire Glass Ceiling Awards Future Shaper.

Their inventions gear towards supporting radiotherapy breast cancer patients and ensuring provision of safe drinking water for developing communities. They became a part of BBC 100 Women 2020 because of their contributions and inspirational role in science, technology, engineering, and mathematics and 2020 Forbes 30 Under 30 Asia under Healthcare and Science.

== Early life and education ==
Butson hails from Wollongong, New South Wales. They began inventing when they were six years old. They attended high school at The Illawarra Grammar School.

== Career ==
Butson invented the SODIS ultraviolet radiation sticker at the age of 18 in 2018. The SODIS sticker tests whether water is safe to drink. They also invented the SMART (Scale Maille Armour for Radiation Therapy) Armour which aims to protect breast cancer patients from the effects of excess radiation during radiotherapy treatment. They currently are working at the Australian Nuclear Science and Technology Organisation as a Health Physics Surveyor. In 2021 they co-founded Passionately Curious, a not-for-profit providing equal access to STEM.
