= Malin Falkenmark =

Swedish hydrologist (1925–2023)

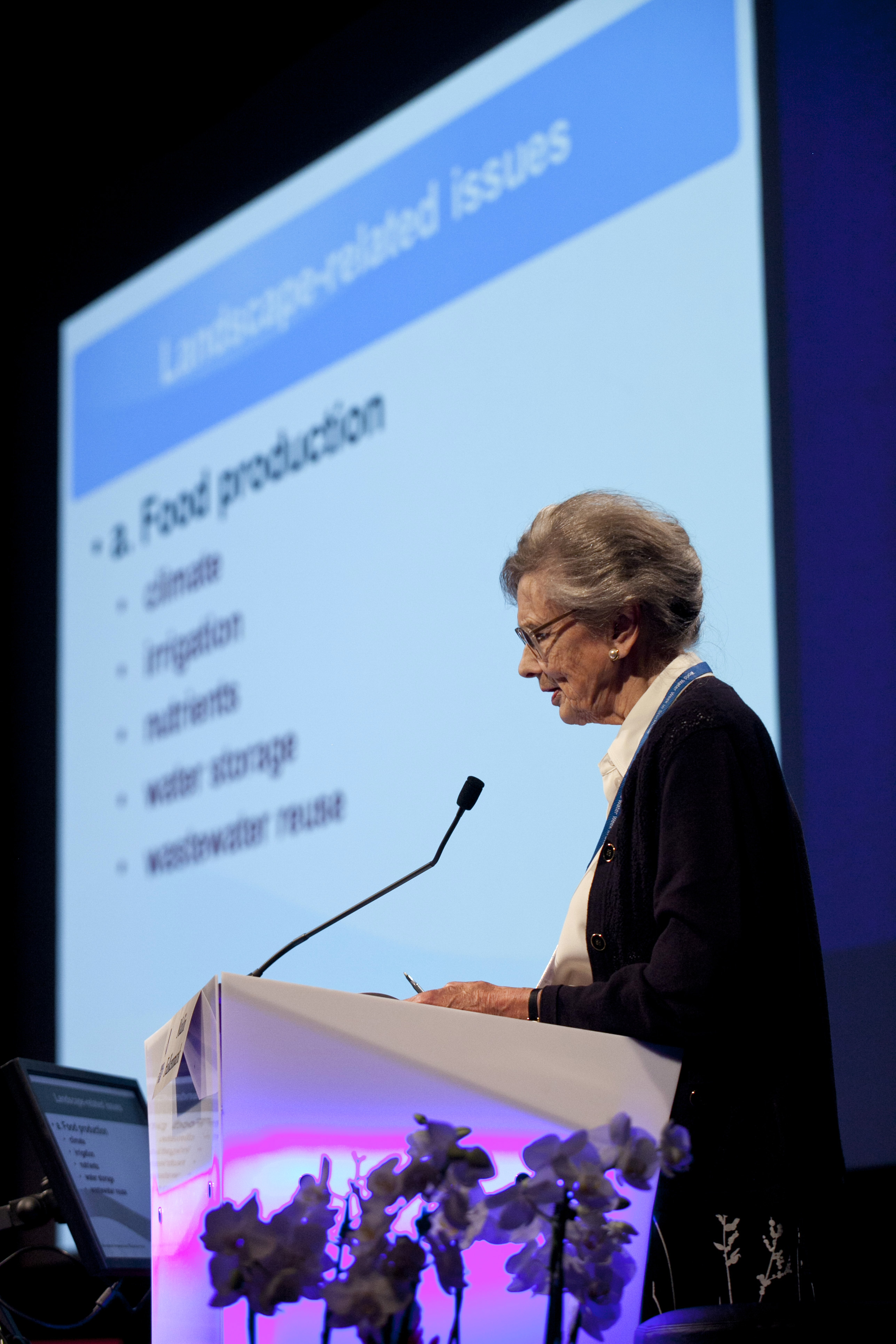
- Falkenmark in 2012
- Born: Malin Fredrika Sofia Sundberg-Falkenmark; 21 November 1925; Stockholm, Sweden
- Died: 3 December 2023 (aged 98)
- Occupations: Hydrologist, professor and author
- Writing career
- Subjects: Water resources, sustainability

Malin Fredrika Sofia Sundberg-Falkenmark (21 November 1925 – 3 December 2023) was a Swedish hydrologist. Falkenmark is best known for her long-standing work and expertise on the sustainable use of water resources to meet human and ecosystem needs. Her work is characterized by an integration of both natural- and social-science approaches. She is particularly known for developing what is now known as the Falkenmark Water Stress Indicator, an indicator used to measure and describe the water available for human use (water scarcity). She was the daughter of Halvar Sundberg.

== Life and career ==
Falkenmark graduated as a Fil. Mag. (Swedish equivalent to a master's degree) in mathematics, physics, chemistry and mechanics at Uppsala University, in 1951. In 1964, she became the first Fil. Lic. (Swedish equivalent of PhD at the time) of hydrology in Sweden, where she studied the “Bearing capacity of an ice sheet”. Later in 1975, she was awarded the title of PhD Honoris causa at Linköping University.

Falkenmark's professional history includes holding positions as State Hydrologist at the Swedish Meteorological and Hydrological Institute (1950s-60's), and later at the Swedish Natural Science Research Council (1965–95), where she became Executive Secretary, and later Chair of the Swedish National Committees for UNESCO’s International Hydrological Decade/Programme.

As the Chair of the Scientific Program Committee at the Stockholm International Water Institute (SIWI) (1991–2003), Falkenmark led the establishment of the annual Stockholm World Water Week (initially named Stockholm Water Symposium), which grew to be the "annual focal point for the globe’s water issues".

Falkenmark held numerous posts on international boards and committees, including as General Rapporteur of the United Nations Water Conference Mar del Plata (1977); World Bank Consultant with special responsibility regarding the looming water scarcity (1988–92); member of the UN Committee on Energy and Natural Resources for Development and the UN Millennium Project Task Force for Environmental Sustainability; member of the Technical Advisory Committee of the Global Water partnership; and Scientific Advisor to the Global Environment Facility and the Comprehensive Freshwater Assessment of the World.

Falkenmark was a Professor of Applied and International Hydrology. Between 1976 and 1979, she led the planning and development of the Department for Water and Environment Studies at Linköping University; after her formal retirement, in 1991, she became part of Stockholm University’s Department of Systems Ecology.

In 2007, she joined the Stockholm Resilience Center as a senior researcher. She was also the senior scientific advisor at the Stockholm International Water Institute (SIWI).

In 2018, she shared the Blue Planet Prize with ecologist Brian Walker.

Falkenmark died on 3 December 2023, at the age of 98.

== The Falkenmark Water Stress Indicator ==
In an article published in 1989, Falkenmark introduced an indicator for water stress that expresses the level of water scarcity in a certain region as the amount of renewable freshwater that is available for each person each year. It eventually became known as the Falkenmark Indicator, and is not only one of the earliest, but also one of the most used indicators to measure and describe water availability for human use.

The level of water scarcity in a certain country was determined based on thresholds: If the amount of renewable water in a country is below 1,700 m^{3} per person per year, that country is said to be experiencing water stress; below 1,000 m^{3} it is said to be experiencing water scarcity; and below 500 m^{3}, absolute water scarcity.

== The Blue and Green Water Paradigm ==
The concepts of green and blue water were first introduced by Falkenmark in 1995, and defined green water as "the rainwater that infiltrates into the root zone and is used for biomass production", and blue water as "the water that either runs off from the soil surface or percolates beyond the root zone to form groundwater".

In a later publication, green water was defined as the soil water held in the unsaturated zone, formed by precipitation and available to plants, while blue water refers to liquid water in rivers, lakes, wetlands and aquifers, which can be withdrawn for irrigation and other human uses. Both resources are important for food production; rainfed agriculture uses green water only, while irrigated agriculture uses both green and blue water.

== Selected awards and recognition ==
- IWRA Ven Te Chow Memorial Award (1991)
- KTH Stora Pris (1995)
- Volvo Environment Prize (1998)
- International Hydrology Prize (1998)
- Rachel Carson Prize (2005)
- Crystal Drop Award (2005)
- Prince Albert II of Monaco Water and Desertification Award (2010)
- Blue Planet Prize (2018)
