= Sarphati Sanitation Awards =

- Description: Global sanitation and public health through entrepreneurship
- Country: Netherlands (International)
- Presented by: World Waternet and partners
- Reward: €25,000 (Promising Entrepreneurs)

The Sarphati Sanitation Awards were created in 2013 to honour individuals or organisations having made contributions to global sanitation and public health, notably through entrepreneurship. They are awarded every two years, and named in honour of Samuel Sarphati, a Dutch sanitation engineer. They were created by World Waternet, the Netherlands Water Partnership and Aqua for All, and are endorsed by the Dutch Ministry of Foreign Affairs through its Directorate-General for International Cooperation. In 2018 the WSSCC joined them. They are usually awarded during the Amsterdam International Water Week.

Originally a single award, from 2015 the awards were split into the Sarphati Sanitation Award for Lifetime Achievement and the Sarphati Sanitation Award for Promising Entrepreneurs. The latter is accompanied by a €25,000 prize.

== List of awards ==
- 2013 : Sanergy, a Kenyan company using container-based sanitation as an alternative to sewers.
- 2015:
  - Life Time Achievement : Dr. Kamal Kar of the CLTS Foundation
  - Young Entrepreneurial Award : Aart van den Beukel, director of Safi Sana, a Dutch held company operating sanitation services in developing countries to produce energy from waste.
- 2017 :
  - Lifetime Achievement : Sasha Kramer, co-founder of SOIL, which provides sanitation services in Haiti.
  - Young Entrepreneur : FINISH Society, which provides sanitation together with financial inclusion, health care and waste management.
- 2019 :
  - Lifetime achievement : Jockin Arputham, co-founder and president of Slum Dwellers International, a global grassroots movement of the urban poor.
  - Promising entrepreneur : Tie between x-runner in Peru and Tiger Toilet in India; Live Clean Zambia was also nominated.

== See also ==
- List of environmental awards

== Links ==
- Official website
