= Paleis voor Volksvlijt =

Former exhibition hall in Amsterdam, Netherlands

Coordinates: 52°21′34″N 4°53′59″E

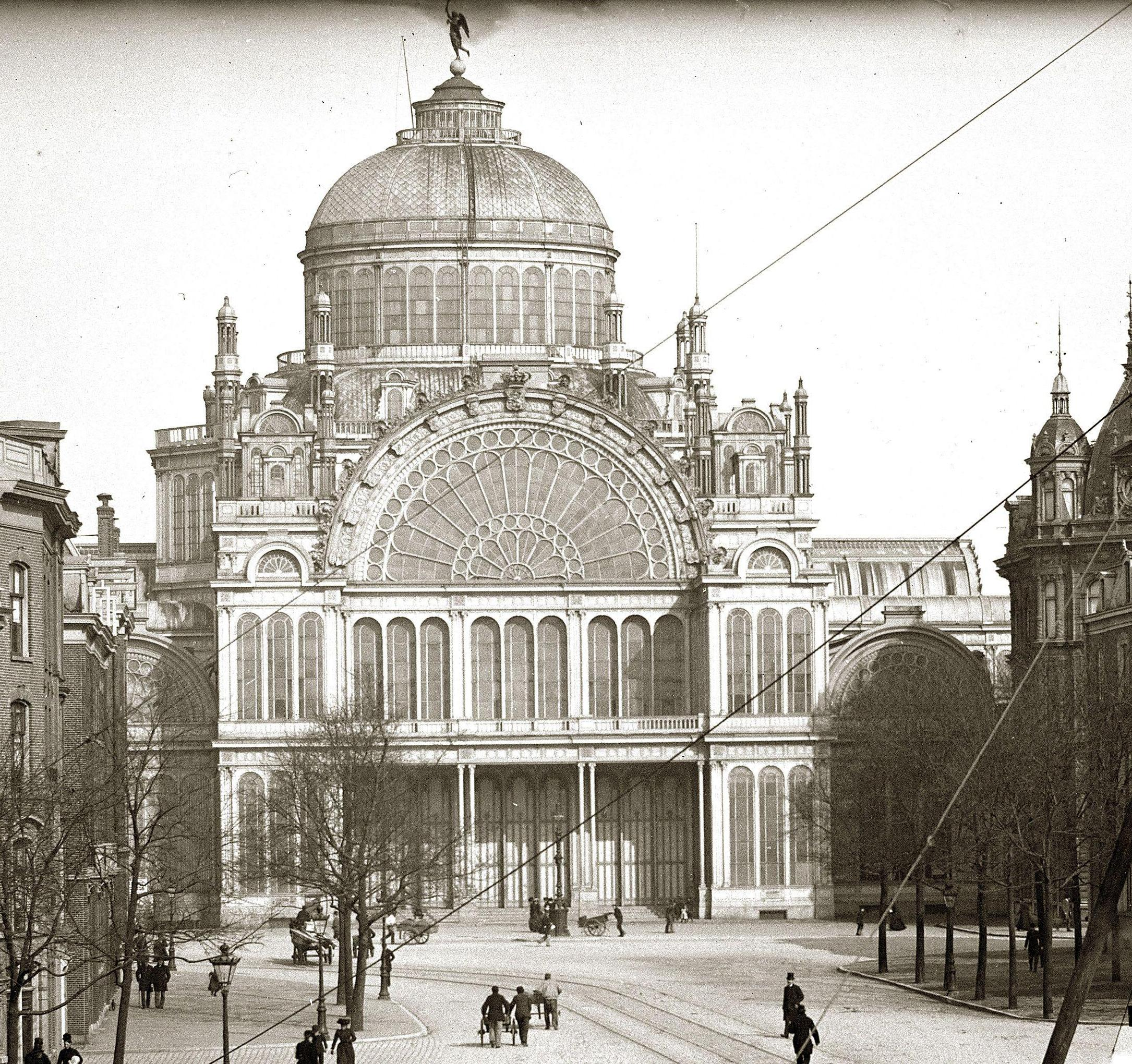
The Palace in 1890

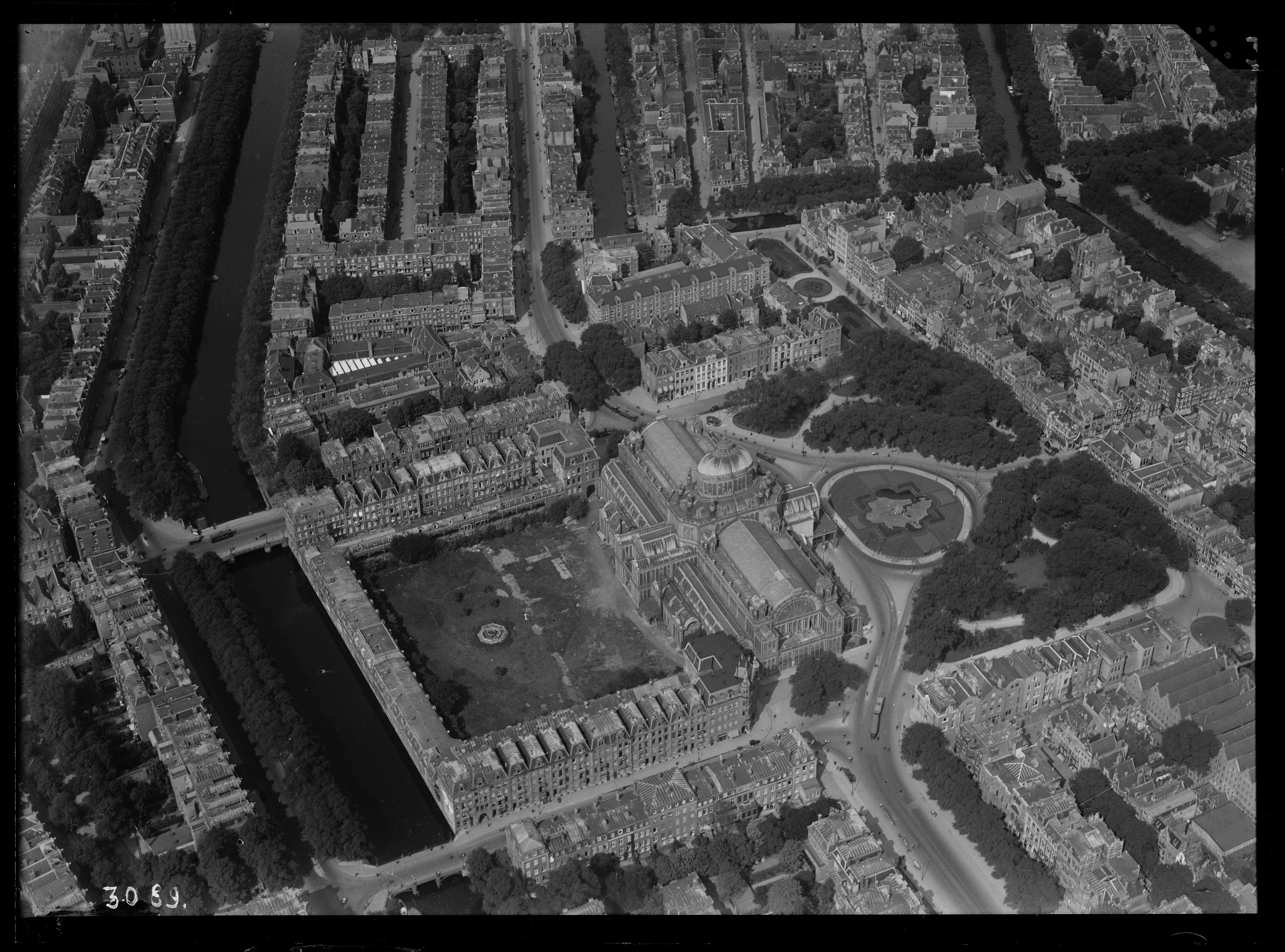
Paleis voor Volksvlijt aerial view, before the fire of 1929

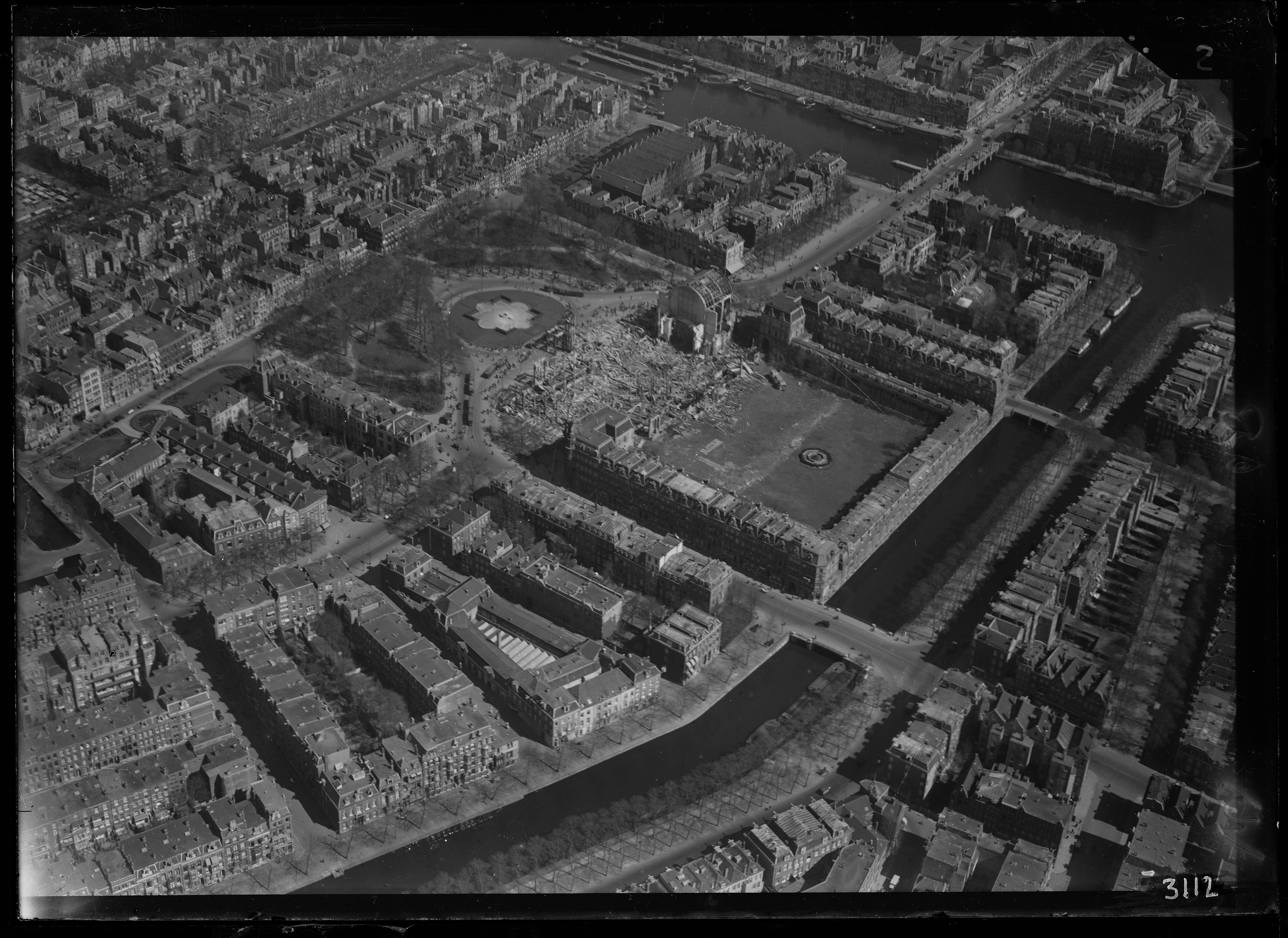
Paleis voor Volksvlijt aerial view, after the fire of 1929

The Paleis voor Volksvlijt (Palace of Industry) was a large exhibition hall in Amsterdam, located on the Frederiksplein, near the current location of De Nederlandsche Bank. The building was constructed between 1859 and 1864. It was designed by architect Cornelis Outshoorn, inspired by the Crystal Palace in London. In 1929, it was destroyed by fire.

== History ==
After Samuel Sarphati had visited The Great Exhibition, he decided to found the Vereeniging voor Volksvlijt (Association for Popular Diligence) with the goal of erecting a building similar to the Crystal Palace in London. In 1853, he petitioned the municipality. His new Palace was to be part of an extensive plan of expansion of the city, which also included construction on the banks of the Amstel and in what is now De Pijp. In 1855, municipal authorities agreed to Sarphati's plan.

A prize was offered for building designs in 1856, but not awarded to any contestant. The Association then contacted Outshoorn. On September 7, 1859, construction was officially started in the presence of king William III. The building was opened on August 16, 1864. Starting 1865, it hosted weekly concerts by its own Palace Orchestra, directed by Johannes Meinardus Coenen until 1891, then by Richard Hol. The famous French constructor of organs, Aristide Cavaillé-Coll, put in place a large concert organ in 1875. This organ was first played by Alexandre Guilmant on October 26, 1875. It was later played by Charles-Marie Widor (1886), Louis Vierne (1895) and Camille Saint-Saëns (1897). The Palace's regular organist, from 1879, was the Belgian Jean-Baptiste de Pauw.

It soon turned out that exploitation of the building as an exhibition hall was infeasible. The Palace, instead, turned into an entertainment center, and part of its garden was sold off. The ground was to house a luxury shopping gallery designed by Adolf Leonard van Gendt in 1881–1883.

Under the directorate of Johannes George de Groot, his operatic troupe performed in the Palace, until it went bankrupt in 1895. The Palace orchestra and organ player were laid off in the same year and the Palace gradually lost its position as a cultural center. The placing of an organ in the Concertgebouw drew the crowd away from the Cavaillé-Coll organ, which was sold to the Haarlem municipality (sponsored by the business men Adriaan Stoop and Julius Carl Bunge). In 1922 it was moved to the Philharmonie Haarlem, where it still resides.

== Destruction by fire ==
A fire destroyed the Palace on the night of April 17, 1929. The gallery or arcade, housing shops and apartments, was spared, but the main building was lost and never reconstructed. Writer Gerard Reve lived in one of the apartments in the gallery in the 1950s. The gallery was finally torn down in 1960 to make way for the new Nederlandsche Bank building.

== Sources ==
- Rudy Kousbroek, Hans van der Meer and Fred Schmidt: Het Paleis in de Verbeelding. Het Paleis voor Volksvlijt 1860-1961. Amsterdam: Boekhandel de Verbeelding, 1990. ISBN 9789074159029.
- Martin Pruijs: Een monument voor dr. Samuel Sarphati. Het Sarphatimonument gerestaureerd. Amsterdam: Gemeentelijk Bureau Monumentenzorg, 1994.
- Emile Wennekes: Het Paleis voor Volksvlijt (1864-1929): 'Edele uiting eener stoute gedachte!' The Hague: Sdu Uitgevers, 1999. ISBN 9789012088138.
