= Samuel Sarphati =

Dutch physician, city planner (1813–1866)

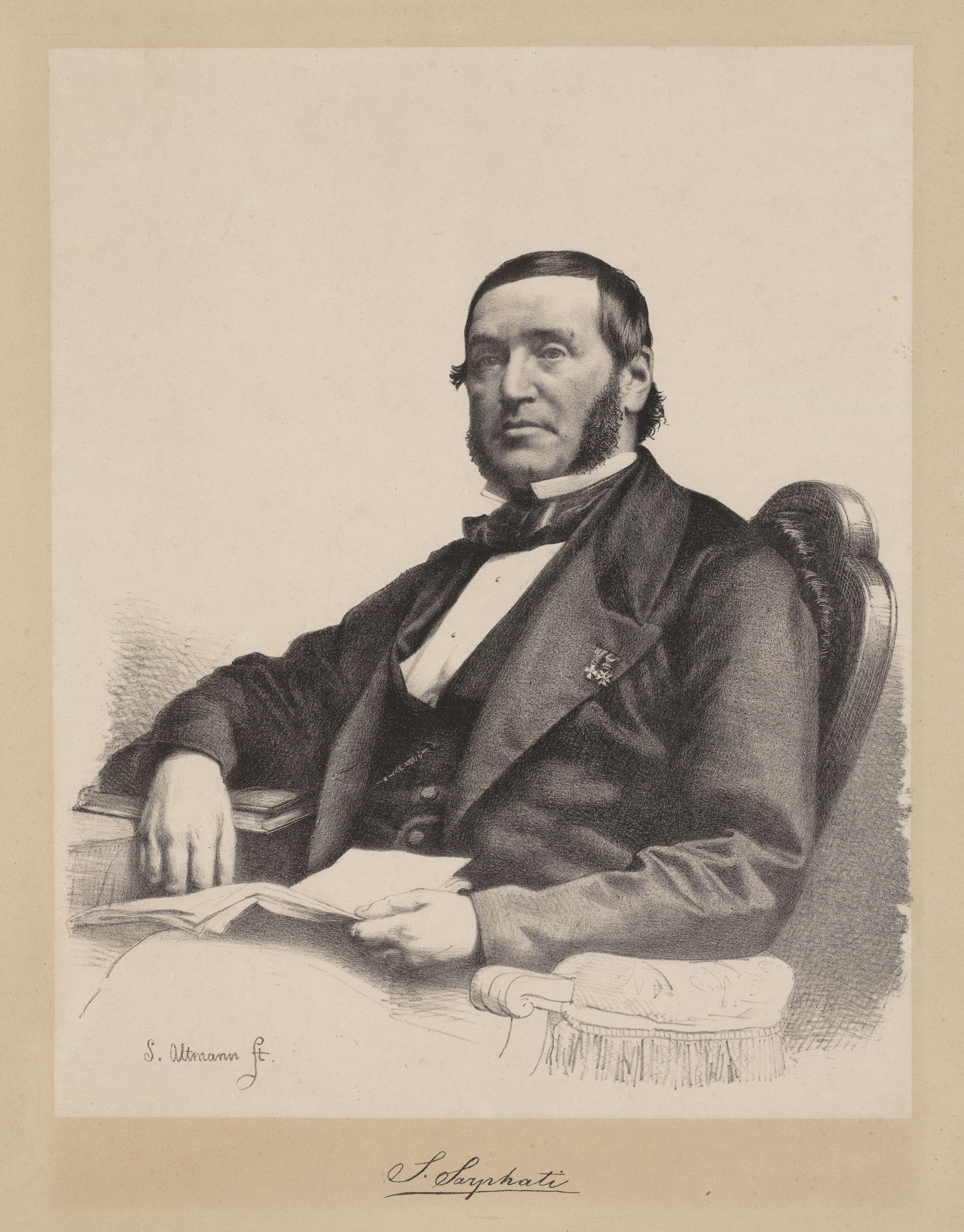
- Samuel Sarphati (by Sybrand Altmann)
- Born: Samuel Sarphati; 31 January 1813; Amsterdam, The Netherlands
- Died: 23 June 1866 (aged 53)
- Education: Leiden University
- Occupations: physician, city planner, entrepreneur
- Years active: 1840-1866
- Spouse: Abigaël Mendes de Leon

Samuel Sarphati (31 January 1813 – 23 June 1866) was a Dutch physician and Amsterdam city planner.

== Biography ==
Sarphati's ancestors were Spanish and Portuguese Jews who arrived in the Netherlands in the 17th century. Though middle-class, his parents were able to let him attend a Latin school. At the age of 20, Sarphati started studying medicine in Leiden, which he finished with a promotion in 1839.

During his work thereafter as a doctor in Amsterdam (he lived at the house #598 Herengracht), Sarphati encountered the bad hygiene among the poor in Amsterdam. His compassion for his patients led him to initiate several projects to improve the quality of life in the city and the health of its inhabitants. This included a bread factory producing wholesome, affordable bread, and a refuse collection service.

Sarphati played an important role in the initiation of waste transport in 1847. He became involved in politics, particularly as a project developer in city planning. Beside public health, he initiated improvements in education and industrialization. He wanted to enhance Amsterdam's dignity and standing by constructing impressive buildings like the Amstel Hotel and the Paleis voor Volksvlijt.

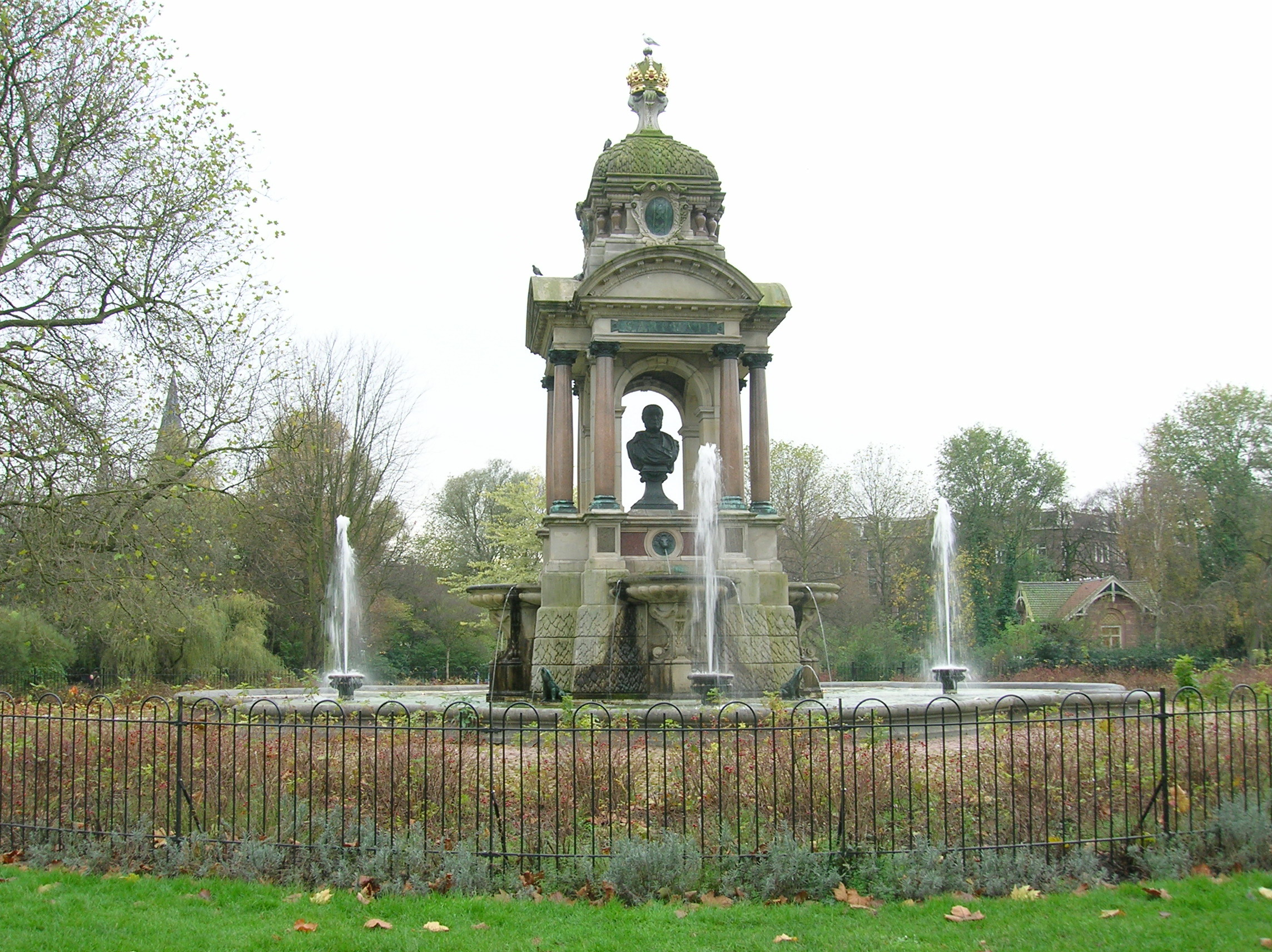
Sarphati monument in the Sarphati park, Amsterdam

After his death, Sarphatipark in Amsterdam was designed and named after him in 1885.

The Sarphati Sanitation Awards have been named in his honour.

== Buildings built on Sarphati's initiative ==
- The first trade school
- A bread factory (Maatschappij voor Meel-en-Broodfabrieken)
- Palace of National Industry (Paleis voor Volksvlijt), destroyed by fire in 1929
- InterContinental Amstel Amsterdam (Amstel Hotel)
