= Heyerdahl Award =

Environmental award

The Thor Heyerdahl International Maritime Environmental Award was established in 1999 by the explorer and scientist Thor Heyerdahl (1914–2002) and the Norwegian Shipowners' Association. The prize recognizes candidates from the shipping industry that have made an outstanding contribution to the environment. To qualify for the award, candidates must have demonstrated exceptional technical innovation and environmental work in correspondence with Thor Heyerdahl's spirit for the conservation of the marine environment.

== Award recipients (2001–2009) ==
Since the first award in 2001, five winners have received the prize:

- Green Award Foundation (2001)
- International Tanker Owners Pollution Federation Limited (ITOPF) (2003)
- NYK Line (2005)
- Wallenius Wilhelmsen Logistics (2007)
- Farstad Shipping (2009)

Eligible candidates are legal entities, organisations and individuals worldwide. Government agencies cannot receive the prize. All proposals are considered by an expert committee and the prize for 2011 will be presented to the winner at the NSA Annual Conference Oslo, Norway. The prize is awarded biennially.

Among previous committee members are Prince Philip, Duke of Edinburgh and Mikhail Gorbachev, the former Soviet statesman, as well as several established names from the shipping industry.

Anyone can nominate candidates to The Thor Heyerdahl International Maritime Environmental Award, but most nominations come from academia, science, government, NGO's and the maritime industry. It is possible to submit nominations online at www.heyerdahlaward.com.

The Thor Heyerdahl Environmental Award is additionally supported by Gard, Skuld, Det Norske Veritas and Trade Winds.

== See also ==
- List of environmental awards
