= Sustainable City Awards =

UK eco business awards

The Sustainable City Awards are a national "green business" awards scheme administered by the City of London Corporation. They aim to "recognise and reward best practice in environmental management and sustainable leadership" across twelve categories.

== Categories ==
- Sustainable Finance
- Sustainable Travel and Transport
- Responsible Waste Management
- Resource Conservation
- Sustainable Building
- Sustainable Food
- Entrepreneurship (social)
- Entrepreneurship (commercial)
- Tackling Climate Change
- Farsight Award
- Greening the Third Sector
- Air Quality
- Sustainable Fashion
- The Sir Peter Parker Award for leadership in sustainability is also awarded to one of the companies shortlisted in one or more of these categories.

== History ==
The awards were established in 2001 attract around 250 applications per year, from SMEs and charities to multi-national banks and corporations. They launch each September and close for entry in November, entry details are on the City of London Corporation's website. The awards are free to enter and no charge is made for attending the awards ceremony, which takes place at Mansion House.

== Accreditation ==
The awards are RSA accredited and winners are submitted for consideration as UK representatives in the "European Business Awards for the Environment" and are run in partnership with numerous other organisations.

== See also ==
- List of environmental awards
