= Global Environmental Citizen Award =

- Description: Awarded to individuals working to restore and protect the global environment
- Country: United States
- Presented by: Harvard Medical School Center for Health and the Global Environment

The Global Environmental Citizen Award is an environmental award created by the Harvard Medical School Center for Health and the Global Environment and bestowed annually upon an individual working to restore and protect the global environment.

== Award recipients ==
In 2003, primatologist Jane Goodall received Harvard's annual Global Environmental Citizen Award. Goodall founded a program called "Take Care", aimed at creating microcredit banks and educating conservation methods to inhabitants near the forest and national park.

In 2004, the award was given to journalist Bill Moyers who has created discussion around the relation between the environment and various political trends, such as the discourse between environmental policy and religious right. Moyers's acceptance made a connection between the rising Christian fundamentalism movement and environmental policies of the post-Columbine era.

Al Gore, the 45th Vice President of the United States, was the 2005 award recipient. Al Gore has long voiced his interests in the role of technology in environmental issues—from biomedical and genetic engineering to the socio-ecological effects of greenhouse gases.

In 2007, Charles, Prince of Wales, (now King Charles III), was presented with the Global Environmental Citizen Award for his work towards preserving the environment. In 1990, Prince Charles started Duchy Originals, a company dedicated to providing small farmers new markets to sell their goods and delivering high-quality organic goods through more sustainable production methods. Since then, Duchy Originals has rapidly grown to profit more than £1 million annually, becoming one of the most well-known and prosperous natural brands in the United Kingdom. For decades, the prince has voiced concerns about the dangerous risks of genetically modified foods, advocated for research into chemical farming and its effects on human health, launched numerous development projects in rural communities, and fostered corporate responsibility toward the environment. The prince has actively called for the improvement of energy efficiency and reduction of toxic discharge. In his award speech, he addressed the role of the British government in recognizing climate change as an utmost global priority.

In 2008, Kofi Annan and Alice Waters received the award for their contributions to sustainable living and agricultural production. Annan has led the Millennium Ecosystem Assessment as Secretary-General of the United Nations, served as the President of the Global Humanitarian Forum and now serves as Chair of the Alliance for Africa's Green Revolution. Waters, founder of Chez Panisse Foundation, has established an organic classroom, the Edible Schoolyard in Berkeley, California, providing a space for students of all ages to tend land, harvest their crops and prepare food fresh from the garden. As a chef, she has long advocated for sustainably produced local goods and empowerment of youth through educational food programs.

== List of winners ==
Source: Harvard College

- Barbara Kingsolver (2013)
- Alec Baldwin (2012)
- Gisele Bündchen (2011)
- The Honorable John Kerry & Teresa Heinz (2010)
- Her Majesty Queen Noor and Edward Norton (2009)
- Kofi Annan and Alice Waters (2008)
- His Majesty Charles III (2007)
- Al Gore (2005)
- Bill Moyers (2004)
- Jane Goodall (2003)
- Harrison Ford (2002)
- E. O. Wilson (2001)

== See also ==
- Global 500 Roll of Honour
- Goldman Environmental Prize
- Grantham Prize for Excellence in Reporting on the Environment
- Heroes of the Environment
- Tyler Prize for Environmental Achievement
- List of environmental awards
