= National Debate Federation Bangladesh =

Debating organization at Bangladesh

- Company type: Non Profit Organisation
- Headquarters: Dhaka, Bangladesh
- Key people: AKM Shoaib, Chairman, Md. Ashiqur Rahman Akash, Secretary General

National Debate Federation Bangladesh (NDF BD) is one of the largest debate associations in Bangladesh. NDF BD organize National Debate festivals, Medical Debate Festivals, Debate Competition, Debate Workshops, Career and Debate School, Quiz competition and leadership skills development workshops. The main objective of NDF BD is taking debate to the districts and beyond to create social awareness among students on various social, political and economic issues to enhance and facilitate the development of value-based human resources. More than sixty public & private universities, two hundred school & colleges and ten non-educational debating organizations are working in the same platform.

== Competition ==
- National Debate Competition Core 0.2- 2022
- 1st International Virtual Debate Festival, 2021
- Bangladesh Bater National School Debate Championship 2020
- NDF BD -Counter Termism Unit Rangpur Divisional Debate Festival,20
- 2020 Pepsodent Expert 1st National Dental College Virtual Debate Championship
- 1st NDF BD Virtual Debate National Debate Championship, 2020
- All Division Virtual Debate Competitions, 2020
- NDF BD Gala Night With Debate Schooling Prize Given Ceremony Shahitto Bikash Center
- BRB 12th NDF BD National Debate Festival 2019; Total Participants: 2000
- Trust Bank 11th NDF BD National Debate Festival 2018; Total Participants: 2000
- 10th NDF BD National Debate Festival 2017; Total Participants: 2000
- Northern University 9th NDF BD National Debate Festival 2016; Total Participants: 2000
- Anantex 8th NDF BD National Debate Festival 2014; Total Participants: 2000
- Trust Bank 7th NDF BD National Debate Festival 2013; Total Participants: 1000
- Janata Bank 6th NDF BD National Debate Festival 2012; Total Participants: 1000
- Trust Bank 5th NDF BD National Debate Festival 2010; Total Participants: 1000
- Pepsi 4th NDF BD National Debate Festival' 08 At Dhaka; Total Participants: 800
- Brb Cables 3rd NDF BD National Debate Festival' 07 At Kushtia; Total Participants: 1500.
- Daffadil University 2nd NDF BD National Debate Workshop & Festival 2006 at Chandpur; Total: Participants: 1200
- 1st NDF BD National Hill Debate Festival' 05 At Rangamati; Total Participants: 1500
- 4th NDF BD Khulna Divisional Debate Festival 2018.
- 3rd NDF BD Sylhet Divisional Debate Festival 2018.
- 5th NDF BD Rangpur Divisional Debate Festival 2018.
- 4th NDF BD Rajshahi Divisional Debate Festival 2018.
- 2nd NDF BD Khulna Divisional Debate Festival 2016; Total Participants: 700
- Mercantile Bank Limited 2nd NDF BD Rajshahi Divisional Debate Festival 2016; Total Participants: 700
- Mercantile Bank Limited 2nd NDF BD Chittagong Divisional Debate Festival 2016; Total Participants: 1000
- Mercantile Bank Limited 5th NDF BD-BDa Barisal Divisional Debate Festival 2016; Total Participants: 1000
- Unimed & Unihealth 6th NDF BD-Kmc Dc National Medical College Debate Festival 2016; Total Participants: 800
- Unimed & Unihealth 5th NDF BD-Rmc Dc National Medical College Debate Festival 2016; Total Participants: 800
- Sk+F 4th NDF BD-Dmc Dc National Medical College Debate Festival 2015; Total Participants: 800
- Sk+F 3rd NDF BD-Cmc Dc National Medical College Debate Festival 2014; Total Participants: 800
- Sk+F 2nd NDF BD-Dmc Dc National Medical College Debate Festival 2012; Total Participants: 800
- Sk+F 1st NDF BD-Dmc Dc National Medical College Debate Festival 2011; Total Participants: 800
- 2nd NDF BD Inter Cadet Parliamentary Debate Workshop 2014; Total Participants: All The Cantonment College Of Bangladesh
- 1st NDF BD Inter Cadet Parliamentary Debate Workshop 2013; Total Participants: All The Cantonment College Of Bangladesh
- NDF BD Inter College Debate Competition 2013; Total Participants: 16 Colleges
- 1st NDF BD Bandorban District Debate Festival 2013; Total Participants: 1000
- Ab Foundation 1st NDF BD Rangpur Divisional Debate Festival 2012; Total Participants: 1200
- 1st NDF BD Jhalakathi District Debate Festival 2012; Total Participants: 1000
- 1st NDF BD Chittagong Divisional Debate Festival 2012;Total Participants: 1000
- Prof. Mojaffor Ahmed Memorial 1st NDF BD Rajshahi Divisional Debate Festival 2012; Total Participants: 500
- Journalist Shagor-Runi Memorial 1st NDF BD Khulna Divisional Debate Festival 2012; Total Participants: 500
- Tareque Masud-Mishuk Munir Memorial Inter University Debate Championship & Inter School Public School Public Speak Competition 2011; Bgmea Auditorium. At Dhaka; Total Participants: 16 Teams & 38 Schools
- Noakhali Science & Technology University Regional Debate Festival, Noakhali 09; Total Participants: 600.
- Hypertension Center 1st NDF BD Rangpur Regional Debate Festival 09; Total Participants: 500
- Channel1- NDF BD 2nd Khulna Divisional Debate Festival At Khulna; Total Participants: 500.
- NDF BD Kishorgonj Regional Debate Workshop 2009; Total Participants: 500
- Channel1- NDF BD 2nd Women Debate Festival At Khulna, 2009; Total Participants: 800.
- NDF BD Annual Leadership Development Program' 08 At Bandarban; Total Participants: 100.
- Maymenshigh Regional Debate Workshop' 08 At Bangladesh Agriculture University, Maymensingh; Total Participants: 1000
- Inter School & College Debate Competition' 07 At Pabna; Total Participants: 35 Teams
- 1st Grameen Debate Festival' 07 At Khoksha At Kushtia; Total Participants: 500.
- Comilla Regional Debate Workshop' 07 At Comilla; Total Participants: 1000
- Rajshahi Divisional Debate Workshop' 07 At Rajshahi; Total Participants: 800
- 1st Women Debate Workshop' 07 At Home Economics College, Dhaka; Total Participants: 1000
- 1st Women Debate Festival' 07 At Eden Women College At Dhaka; Total Participants: 1000
- Inter University & Medical College Debate Championship' 06 At Jahangirnagar University, Savar; Total Team: 60
