= Environmental award =

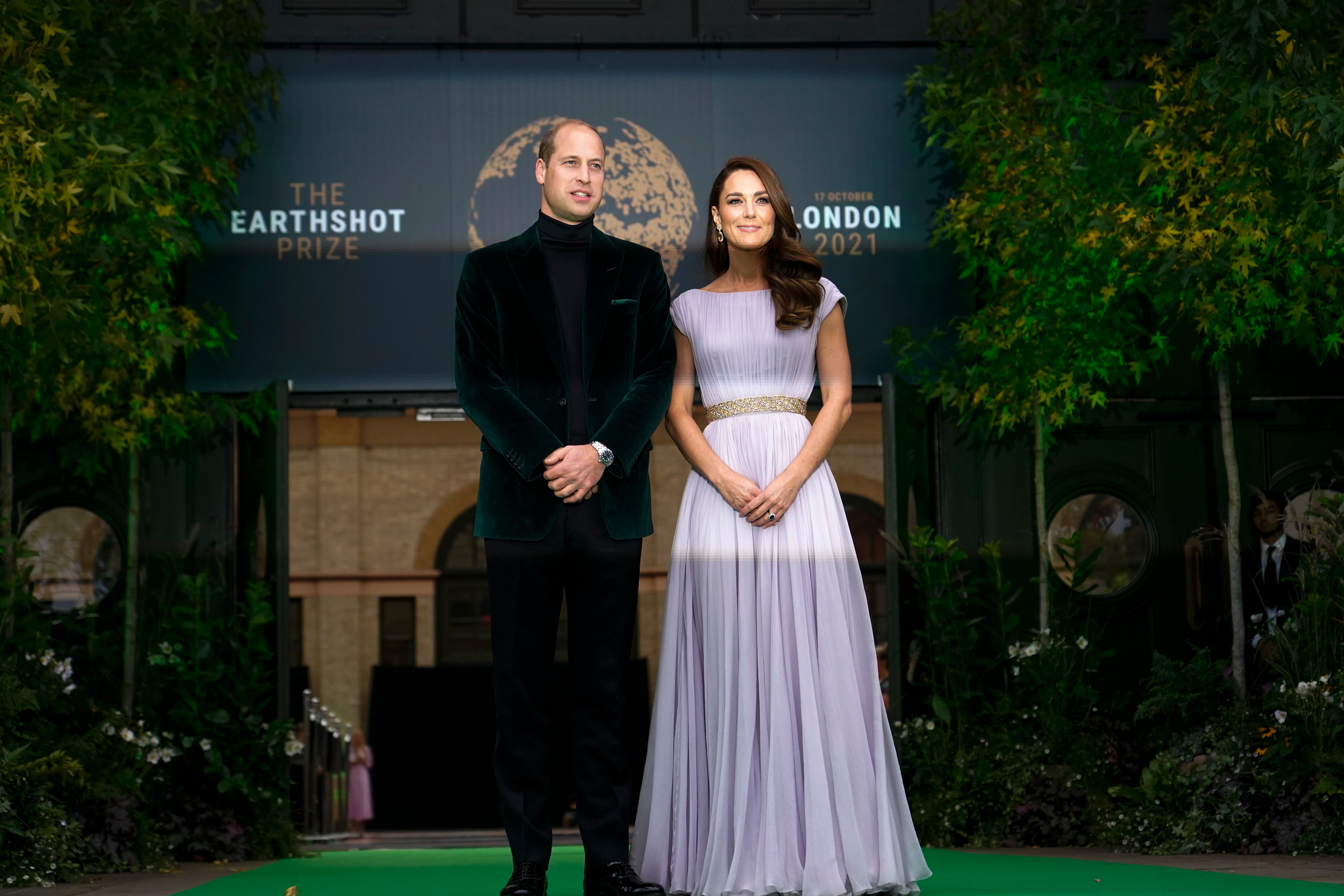
The Duke and Duchess of Cambridge at the inaugural Earthshot Prize awards in London in 2021

An environmental award is usually awarded for activities that lead to the protection of the environment. The awards may be open to the global community or only within a particular country or field of work.

== Notable global environmental awards ==
- The United Nations Environment Programme (UNEP) established the Global 500 Roll of Honour in 1987 to recognise the environmental achievements of individuals and organizations around the world.
- Ramsar Wetland Conservation Award
- Goldman Environmental Prize
- Earthshot Prize established in 2021 by The Royal Foundation.

== See also ==
- Environmental issue
- Environmentalism
- List of environmental awards
- Sustainability
