= JouleX =

Software company

- Type: Division
- Industry: Energy Management
- Founded: 2009
- Fate: Acquired by Cisco Systems
- Headquarters: Atlanta and Kassel, United States and Germany
- Key people: Tom Noonan (Founder and CEO)
- Products: Joulex Energy Manager (JEM)
- Number of employees: 25-50
- Parent: Cisco Systems
- Website: JouleX.net

JouleX was a software company that specializes in monitoring and control of the power consumption of computers and associated devices attached to networks. Founded in 2009, with headquarters in Atlanta, USA, it was acquired by Cisco in 2013.

== History ==
JouleX was founded in 2009 by two former Internet Security Systems employees, Tom Noonan and Rene Seeber, and Josef Brunner, a security specialist in Germany. The company received capital investments from Target Partners and TechOperators. The company is headquartered in Atlanta, Georgia, USA, and has offices in Germany, Japan, China and France. In July 2013, the company was acquired by Cisco.

== Products ==
JouleX Energy Manager is a software energy management platform that allows monitoring, analysis and management of electrical power consumption by devices and systems across a local or wide area network, including in distributed offices, data centers and facilities. It works with personal computers (including Microsoft Windows, Mac OS X, and Linux derivatives), monitors, servers, network-attached printers, wireless access points, network switches, routers, IP-based HVAC and lighting systems, power distribution units (PDU), and smart meters. It requires no agent software to be installed on the device.

== Target market ==
JouleX Energy Manager is primarily intended to allow medium-sized and large organizations to reduce their spending on electricity and to bring down their carbon footprint. A 2009 report estimated that nearly half of all corporate PCs in the US are not regularly switched off at night, costing US businesses around $2.8 billion in electricity and equating to approximately 20 million tons of carbon emissions, roughly the equivalent environmental impact as 4 million cars.
