= Harvard Medical School Center for Health and the Global Environment =

The Center for Health and the Global Environment is located at the Harvard T.H. Chan School of Public Health. The mission of the center is to help people understand that our health, and that of our children, depends on the health of the environment, and that we must do everything we can to protect it. It bestows the Global Environmental Citizen Award annually upon an individual working to protect the environment.

The center was founded in 1996, at Harvard Medical School, to promote a wider understanding of the human health consequences of global environmental change. The Center moved to the Harvard Chan School in October 2012.

To realize the mission and catalyze change, the center:

- Conducts research and translate knowledge into concrete, personal terms that everyone can relate to.
- Informs policy by bringing the latest and best science into legislative decisions.
- Convenes today's thought leaders to advance strategies for creating a healthy world.
- Educates and inspires tomorrow's leaders so that they may influence the direction of their chosen fields towards a more sustainable future.
- Empowers key stakeholders to make decisions that will protect for our health and the health of the environment.

In May 2018, it launched the Center for Climate, Health, and the Global Environment (Harvard Chan C-CHANGE), directed by former EPA Administrator Gina McCarthy. The center is now directed by Dr. Aaron Bernstein.

== Programs ==
- Climate, Energy, and Health
- Corporate Sustainability and Health
- Executive Education for Sustainability Leadership
- Healthy and Sustainable Food
- International Sustainable Tourism Initiative
- Nature, Health, and the Built Environment
- Sustainable Technologies and Health
