= World Water Week in Stockholm =

World Water Week in Stockholm is a week-long global water conference held each year in late August or early September. Known as World Water Week, the event is organized and led by the Stockholm International Water Institute (SIWI). Events and conference sessions address a wide range of the world's water, development and sustainability issues and related concerns of international development.

Around 1500 on-site and online participants attended the conference in 2023. The week feature experts and representatives from business, governments, water management and science sectors, intergovernmental and non governmental organisations, research and training organisations, and United Nations agencies. The conference features plenary sessions, workshops, and seminars as well as on-site exhibition.

In 2023, more than 500 organisations from 190 countries and territories participated in World Water Week both on-site and online.

Functioning as an open platform, World Water Week aims to link practice, science, policy and decision-making. It enables participants to exchange views and experiences, form partnerships and shape joint solutions to global water challenges. During the week, the Stockholm Water Prize, and the Stockholm Junior Water Prize are given out.

== History ==
The World Water Week in Stockholm originally began as the Stockholm Water Symposium in 1991 and has been convened annually ever since. In 2001, the official name became World Water Week in Stockholm. SIWI identifies a conference theme to place a specific focus on one aspect of the world's escalating water crisis. Initially, one theme was promoted for 4–5 years. Since 2008, a different theme has been selected for each year.

== Earlier World Water Week Themes ==
- 1992-1997: "Minimising Harmful Fluxes From Land to Water"
- 1998-2002: "Water is the Key to Socio-economic Development and Quality of Life"
- 2003-2007: "Drainage Basin Security: Prospects for Trade Offs and Benefit Sharing in a Globalised World"
- 2008: "Progress and Prospects on Water: For A Clean and Healthy World." Special attention was given to sanitation issues as part of the International Year of Sanitation 2008.
- 2009: "Responding to Global Changes: Accessing Water for the Common Good with Special Focus on Transboundary Waters"
- 2010: "Responding to Global Changes: The Water Quality Challenge — Prevention, Wise Use and Abatement"
- 2011: "Responding to Global Changes: Water in an Urbanising World"
- 2012: "Water and Food Security"
- 2013: "Water Cooperation — Building Partnerships"
- 2014: "Energy and Water"
- 2015: "Water for Development"
- 2016: "Water for Sustainable Growth"
- 2017: "Water and Waste: Reduce and Reuse"
- 2018: "Water, Ecosystems and Human Development"
- 2022: "Seeing the unseen: The value of water”"
- 2023: "Seeds of Change: Innovative Solutions for a Water-Wise World"
- 2024: "Bridging Borders: Water for a Peaceful and Sustainable Future"

== See also ==
- World Water Day
