= Stockholm International Water Institute =

Swedish research institute

Stockholm International Water Institute (SIWI)
- Founded: 1991
- Type: Policy Institute
- Purpose: Improving water governance
- Headquarters: Stockholm, Sweden
- Region served: Worldwide
- Method: Research, policy support and recommendations, partnerships
- Website: siwi.org

The Stockholm International Water Institute (SIWI) is an independent, non-profit organization based in Stockholm and working globally to improve how societies manage and make decisions about water. It helps create knowledge, develop capacity, and offer policy advice to countries, communities, and companies.

== Activities ==
SIWI initiates research, manages projects and carries out investigations on a wide range of water-related issues.

The organization works to influence decision-makers through its power to convene, its expertise in water governance, building dialogue, and improving policies to change water governance practice

It regularly publishes reports, articles and policy briefs on a wide range of water and development issues. Staff members have expertise on water management, environmental science, strategy or technical support.

The Swedish Water House (SWH) is an initiative funded by Swedish government departments and directed within the SIWI organization. Serving as a network for Swedish stakeholders within different parts of the water sector, SWH aims at focusing Swedish competence in water-related issues and connecting that competence to international processes.

== World Water Week ==
SIWI arranges the World Water Week in Stockholm, an annual week-long conference for professionals from around the globe working in the field of water and development. Each August, World Water Week typically convenes approximately 2500 participants in from government, academia, civil society, the private sector and international and regional organisations.

== See also ==
- Centre for Water Economics, Environment and Policy
- Stockholm Water Prize
