= Stockholm Junior Water Prize =

Annual environmental award

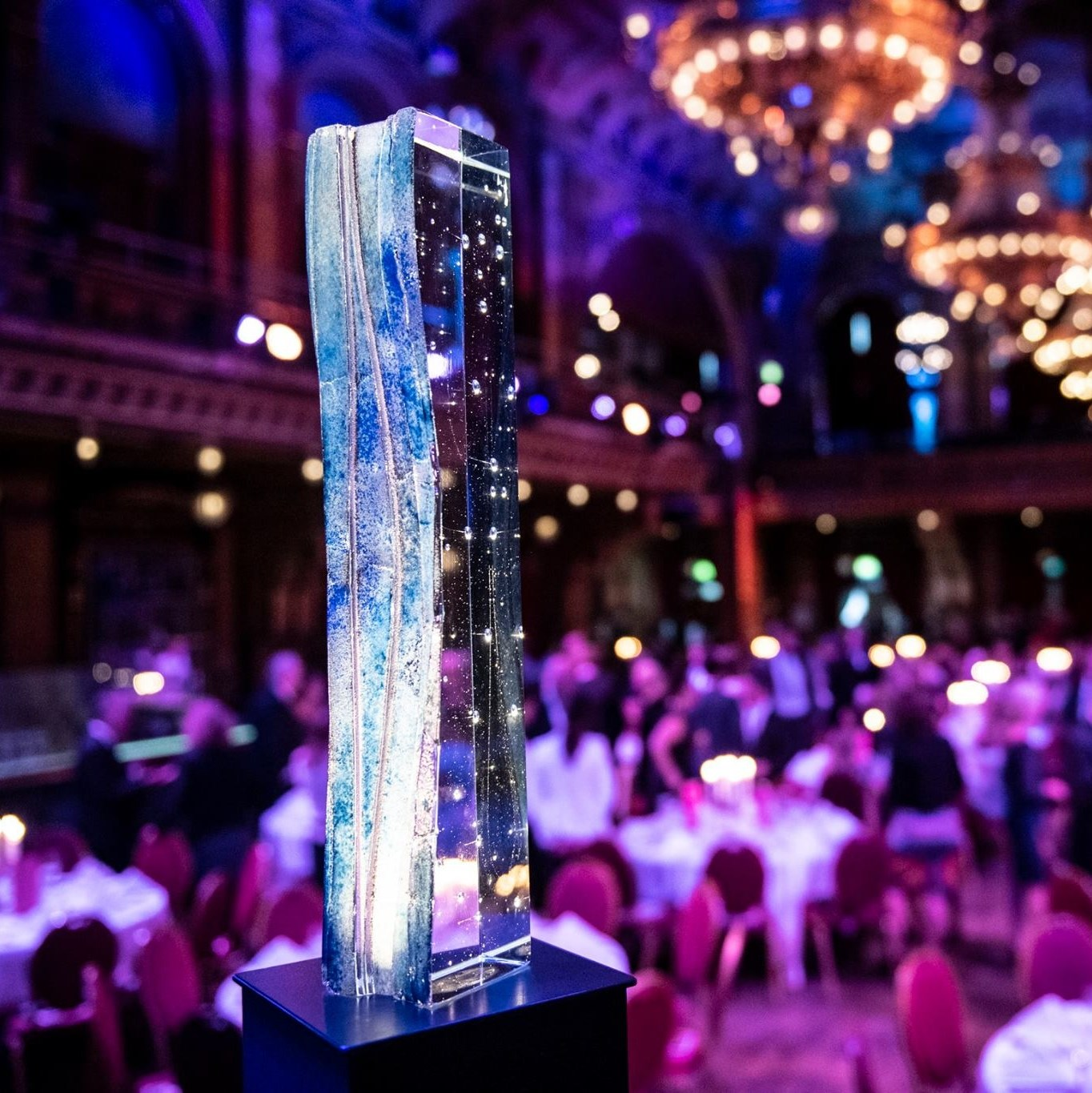
- The modern Stockholm Junior Water Prize trophy[1] is designed by Linda Röjås and Jonas Torstensson at Torstensson Art & Design[2], a Swedish design and architecture studio.
- Native name: SJWP
- Description: Encouraging youth research in water and environment
- Country: Sweden (International)
- Presented by: Stockholm Water Foundation
- Rewards: $15,000 scholarship and a crystal sculpture

The international Stockholm Junior Water Prize (SJWP) is a competition that encourages young people's interest in water and environment issues. Beginning in 1995, the award is given annually for an outstanding water project by a young person or a small group of young people at a ceremony held during the World Water Week in Stockholm. The first two years the competition was held on a national level in Sweden. From 1997 onward the competition has been held in its current international format. The international Stockholm Junior Water Prize winner receives a US$15,000 scholarship and a blue crystal sculpture.

The finalists at the international Stockholm Junior Water Prize are the winners of their national contests, drawing over 10,000 entries from over 30 countries. The national and international competitions are open to pre-university young people ages 15–20 who have conducted water-related projects on topics on environmental, scientific, social, or technological importance. The national competitions have helped students around the world become active in water issues.

Crown Princess Victoria of Sweden is the Patron of the Stockholm Junior Water Prize, and has been since its foundation. Stockholm Water Foundation administers the Stockholm Junior Water Prize.

== Past winners ==
Past winners are as follows.

Year	Country	Competitor name/s	Project	Other notes
2024	United Kingdom	Christopher M. Whitfeld, Jonathan Zhao	Work in low-cost detection and filtration mechanisms for the carcinogenic PFAS chemicals.	In this year, 30 countries were represented at the competition, with 40 participants.
2023	United States	Naomi Park	Work in the concurrent removal of soluble ocean carbon dioxide and oil-in-water contaminants.	In this year, 38 countries were represented at the competition, with 58 participants.
2022	Canada	Annabelle M. Rayson	Research on how to prevent and treat harmful algae blooms.	
2021	United States	Eshani Jha	Research on how to remove contaminants from freshwater in simple and cost efficient ways.	
2020	Japan	Hiroki Matsuhashi, Takuma Miyaki	Developed a new method to increase food production and control soil runoff, using Tataki, the traditional Japanese soil solidification technology.	
2019	Australia	Macinley Butson	Developed an innovative ultraviolet sticker to accurately measure large UV exposures for solar disinfection of water.	
2018	Singapore	Caleb Liow Jia Le, Johnny Xiao Hong Yu	Produced reduced graphene oxide from agricultural waste products, a material that can be used to purify water.	
2017	United States	Rachel Chang, Ryan Thorpe	Created a novel approach to rapidly and sensitively detect and purify water contaminated with E. coli, Shigella, Cholera, and Salmonella.	
2016	Thailand	Sureeporn Triphetprapa, Thidarat Phianchat and Kanjana Komkla	Developed water retention device that mimics the water retention of the Bromeliad plant.	
2015	United States	Perry Alagappan	Invented a method that uses nanotechnology to remove electronic waste from water.	Research experiments conducted with support from the members of the Barron Lab of Rice University, Houston, Texas.
2014	Canada	Hayley Todesco	Invented a method that uses sand filters to treat oil contaminated water and recover water for reuse.	
2013	Chile	Naomi Estay and Omayra Toro	Work on how living organisms can help clean oil spills in extremely low temperatures.	
2012	Singapore	Luigi Marshall Cham, Jun Yong Nicholas Lim and Tian Ting Carrie-Anne Ng	Research on how clay can be used in a low cost method to remove and recover pollutants from wastewater.	
2011	United States	Alison Bick	Developed a low-cost portable method to test water quality using a mobile phone.	
2010	Canada	Alexandre Allard and Danny Luong	Research on readily available bacteria able to degrade polystyrene and decontaminate polystyrene-contaminated water.	
2009	Turkey	Ceren Burçak Dag	Developed a high tech solution that used PVDF, a smart material with piezoelectric properties, to transfer the kinetic energy of raindrops into electrical energy.	
2008	United States	Joyce Chai	Developed a novel technique to quantifying the potential toxicity of silver nanoparticles to the world's water sources and the environment, and in doing so repudiating the assertion that consumer products that contain nanosilver are more reliable and less environmentally hazardous than alternatives.	
2007	Mexico	Adriana Alcántara Ruiz, Dalia Graciela Díaz Gómez and Carlos Hernández Mejía	Researched the elimination of Pb(II) from water via bio-adsorption using eggshell.	
2006	China	Wang Hao, Xiao Yi and Weng Jie	Development of low-cost, ecologically friendly technology to restore a polluted urban river channel. Displayed "originality, ingenuity and tenacity"	
2005	South Africa	Pontso Moletsane, Motebele Moshodi and Sechaba Ramabenyane	Solution to minimize the need for water in small-scale irrigation. They developed a low-current electric soil humidity sensor which uses light detection to control water pipe valves and improve irrigation efficiency.	
2004	Japan	Tsutomu Kawahira, Daisuke Sunakawa and Kaori Yamaguti	Development and application of an environmentally friendly organic fertiliser for the Miyako Island. The method is applicable to many places around the world.	
2003	South Africa	Claire Reid	Research into an innovative, practical, easily applicable technique for planting and successfully germinating seeds in water-scarce areas to improve rural and peri-urban livelihoods.	
2002	United States	Katherine Holt	Research that looked at how foreign species could be introduced to benefit the Chesapeake while preserving the Bay's native oyster species and meeting national environmental goals.	
2001	Sweden	Magnus Isacson, Johan Nilvebrant and Rasmus Öman	Research on the use of natural materials to remove metals in leachate from landfills.	
2000	United States	Ashley Mulroy	Investigation into how inefficient waste water treatment processes can lead not only to antibiotic contamination in American waterways, but also to progressive resistance among harmful bacteria to those same antibiotics that once controlled them.	
1999	Spain	Rosa Lozano, Elisabeth Pozo and Rocío Ruiz	Research that used sea urchins, starfish and sea cucumbers to measure the effectiveness of an EU beach protection program on Spain's western Mediterranean coast.	
1998	Germany	Robert Franke	Design of the Aquakat, a solar-powered, flow-through reactor for the treatment of industrial wastewaters.	
1997	United States	Stephen Tinnin	Investigation into the correlation between the reproductive rate of sea urchins and water pollution.	
1996	Sweden	Maria Bergström, Katarina Evans, Anette Gustafsson and Elin Sieurin	Proposal of the establishment of a wetland area to reduce the outflow of nutrients into the Baltic Sea, and thereby also creating a recreational park for the enjoyment of the citizens in Nyköping municipality.	
1995	Sweden	Mattias Wiggberg	Research into overfertilization and its effect on Lake Kvarnsjön in Södertälje municipality, as well as his proposed actions to mitigate the problems he found.	The local government acted on his research.

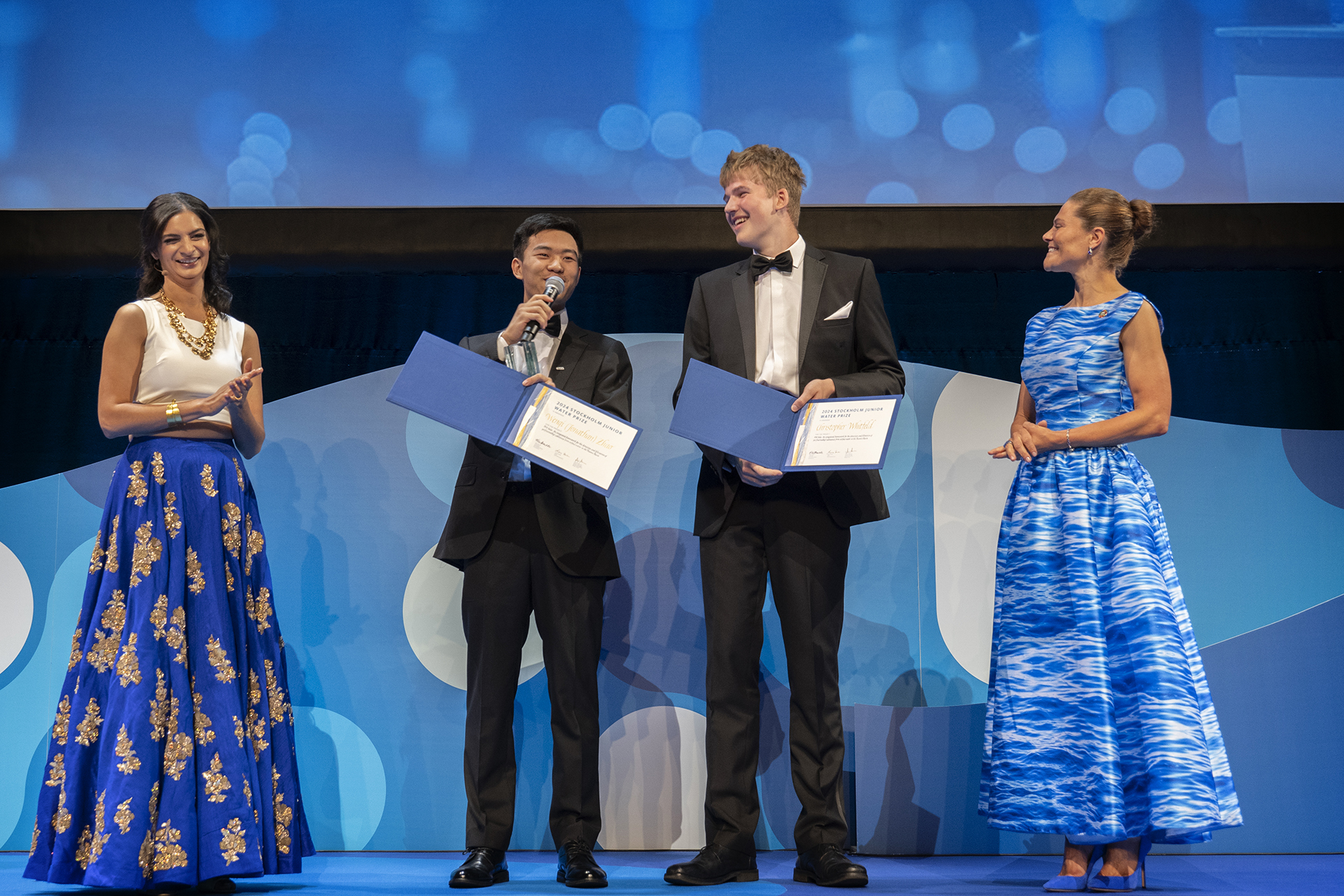
The 2024 Winners (Whitfeld and Zhao, United Kingdom) with Crown Princess Victoria

== SJWP experience at World Water Week ==
National winners who attend the SJWP, participate in a six day program that is filled with social, cultural, and environmental activities.

=== Prize ceremony ===
One unique component of SJWP is the prize-giving ceremony. Crown Princess Victoria is in attendance, along with the Chairman of the Stockholm City Council. Participants are then introduced by their country, in alphabetical order. Participants stand on stage and fly their national flag. Speeches are given by the competition organiser, Chairman of the Stockholm City Council, and figures from the competition sponsor's Xylem Inc. There are musical intermissions.

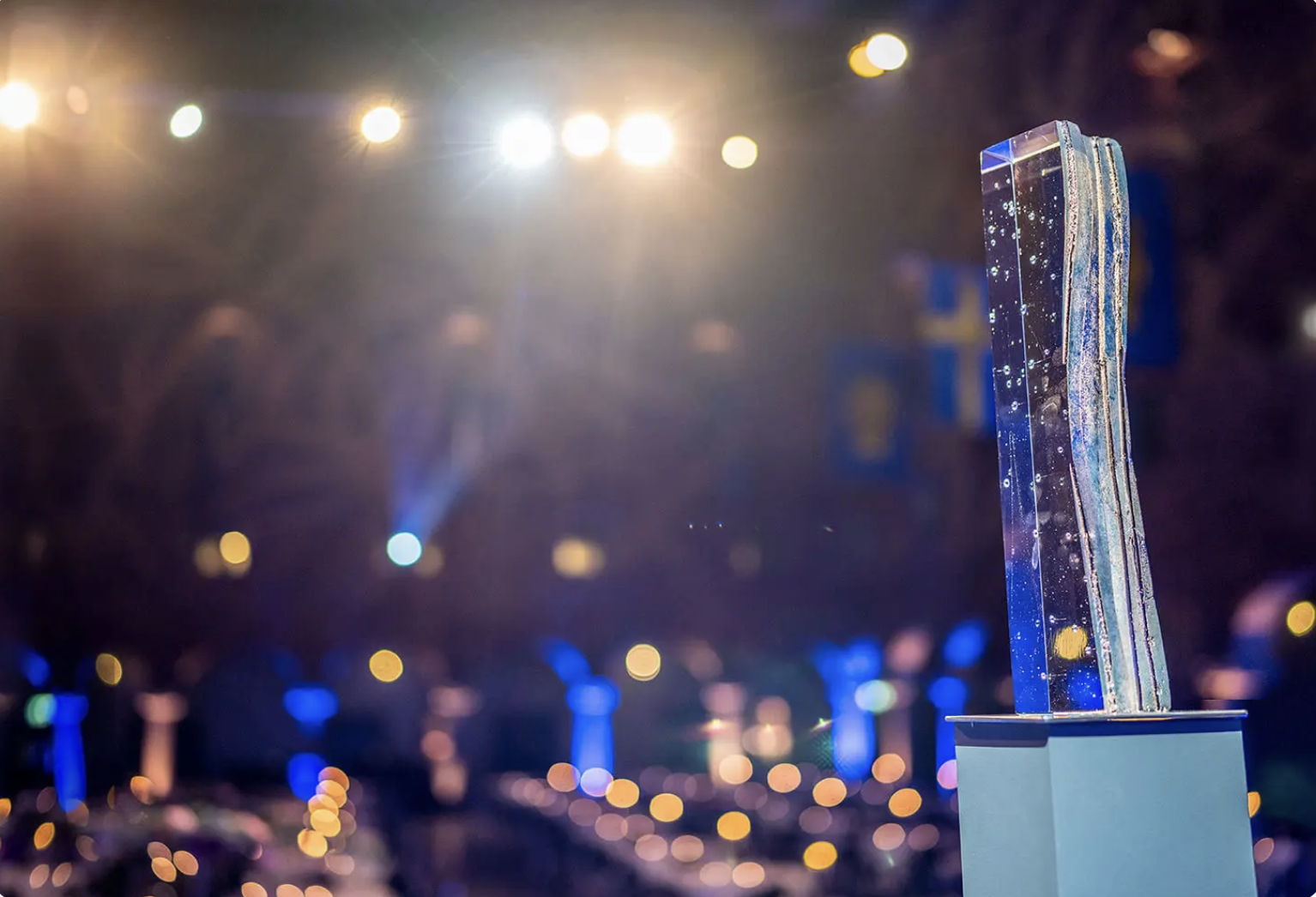
2015 the new Stockholm Water Prize statue was designed by Jonas Torstensson and Linda Röjås at Torstensson Art & Design

Awards are given out in relatively quick succession. The People's Choice Award is presented by the organiser Ania Andersch, and the winner is interviewed. A video produced by the participant explaining their idea is then played. The Diploma of Excellence is handed out by the Crown Princess, and the winner is given an interview as well. Their video is also played. The ceremony closes with the announcement of the Winner of the Stockholm Junior Water Prize. The Stockholm Junior Water Prize statue is handed out by the Crown Princess, their video is played, and then they are given a more extensive post-win reaction interview on stage. When the ceremony ends, the winners follow behind the Crown Princess and have a private conversation with her for five minutes.

The statue has the same design as the Stockholm Water Prize statue.

=== Cultural experiences ===
The old Stockholm Junior Water Prize sculpture

The highlight of the trip for many participants is the banquet hosted at the Stockholm City Hall, the venue of the Nobel Prize dinner. The King or Queen of Sweden, or both, are in attendance, and guests are treated to a reception, three-course meal, and coffee. Musicians perform throughout the evening as well, with tributes to ABBA contrasted by thematic pieces like Ravel's Ondine. The Stockholm Water Prize Laureate gives a speech, as well as the chair of the Stockholm Water Prize Jury. Guests are expected to wear black tie or a national costume. The banquet occurs on the last night (Wednesday) of the SJWP week, although World Water Week continues until the Friday. The banquet invites leading figures involved in the organisation of the WWW, typically about 200 people.

=== Environmental activities ===
Participants spend half a day at the headquarters of Xylem, the competition sponsors. There, they are given insights into Xylem's research into pumps and fluid dynamics, career opportunities at Xylem, and an inspirational talk from environmental activists. In 2024, Mina Guli, an ultramarathon runner from Australia who raises awareness about the water crisis, spoke to the finalists.

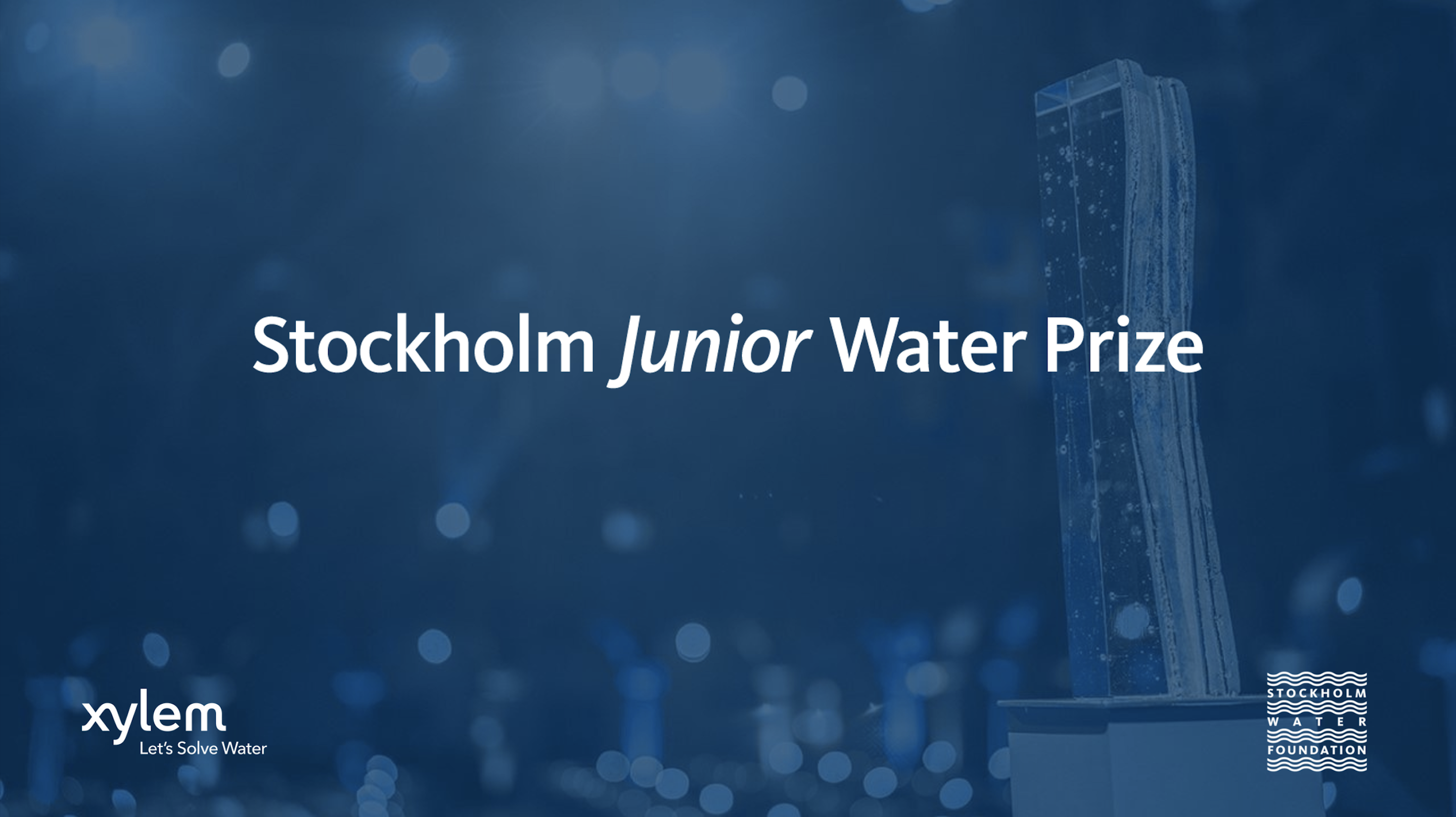
Stockholm Junior Water Prize

As part of WWW, finalists are given the chance to engage in some of the events that are on offer. In 2024, finalists participated in a workshop promoting gender equality in the water sector.

=== Social activities ===
One aim of SJWP is to connect the diverse international cohort together, to foster lifelong connections. Participants usually stay at the Scandic Klara Hotel in central Stockholm. There, they are provided breakfast and accommodation. In previous years, the cohort has been given city tours of Gamla stan and the Central Business District, and been allowed to visit the range of museums and monuments in the area, such as the Avicii Experience. Speed-networking sessions, a party, games, and karaoke have all been part of the program in the past. These informal sessions culminate with a visit to Skansen, where participants and those connected to the prize are hosted for a traditional meal, and tour of the museum after the SJWP ceremony.

== Structure of submission ==
=== International submission ===
To compete at the international SJWP, countries must submit a paper no longer than 20 pages (excluding references and a title page). They must then prepare a presentation, which is limited to 6 slides, and a video for the People's Choice Award. In Stockholm, each team will present three times on the same day, to three juries composed of hydrologists and other water experts. These presentations are strictly limited to five minutes in length. This is followed by a 10 minute Q&A.

=== National Submission ===
To compete at the SJWP, participants must win the finals in their own country first. More than 40 countries have participated in the prize, which means there is much variation in how the prize is dealt with at a national level. The following table summarises the nature of these competitions. All information has been collected from national organisers directly.

Country	Opens/Closes	National Finals	Prize money	Regional	Submission Type	Jury	Venue	Webpage	Additional Notes
Cyprus	October	April	-	-	Presentation	Single	Water Museum of Lemesos	https://eoalemesos.org.cy/en/water-competition	
Mexico	November	May	US$3000	February	Poster	Rotating	Embassy of Sweden in Mexico	https://premiojuvenildelagua.cershi.org/	
Republic of Korea	July/Early November	Late November	US$1500-3000	-	Varies	Rotating	Daegu Korea, Korea International Water Week	https://kjwp.org/	
Switzerland	May/End of October	End of April	Varies	Late January	Poster	Rotating	Varies, part of larger national science contest hosted at a University	https://sjf.ch/	
Türkiye	December	May	32.500 ₺	-	Poster	Single	Online	https://www.dsi.gov.tr/	
United Kingdom	January/Mid-May	Late May	GBP£1000	-	Presentation	Single	Online	https://www.ciwem.org/events/awards/	
United States			US$10,000					https://www.wef.org/membership--community/students--young-professionals/sjwp/	
