= Menachem Elimelech =

American engineer

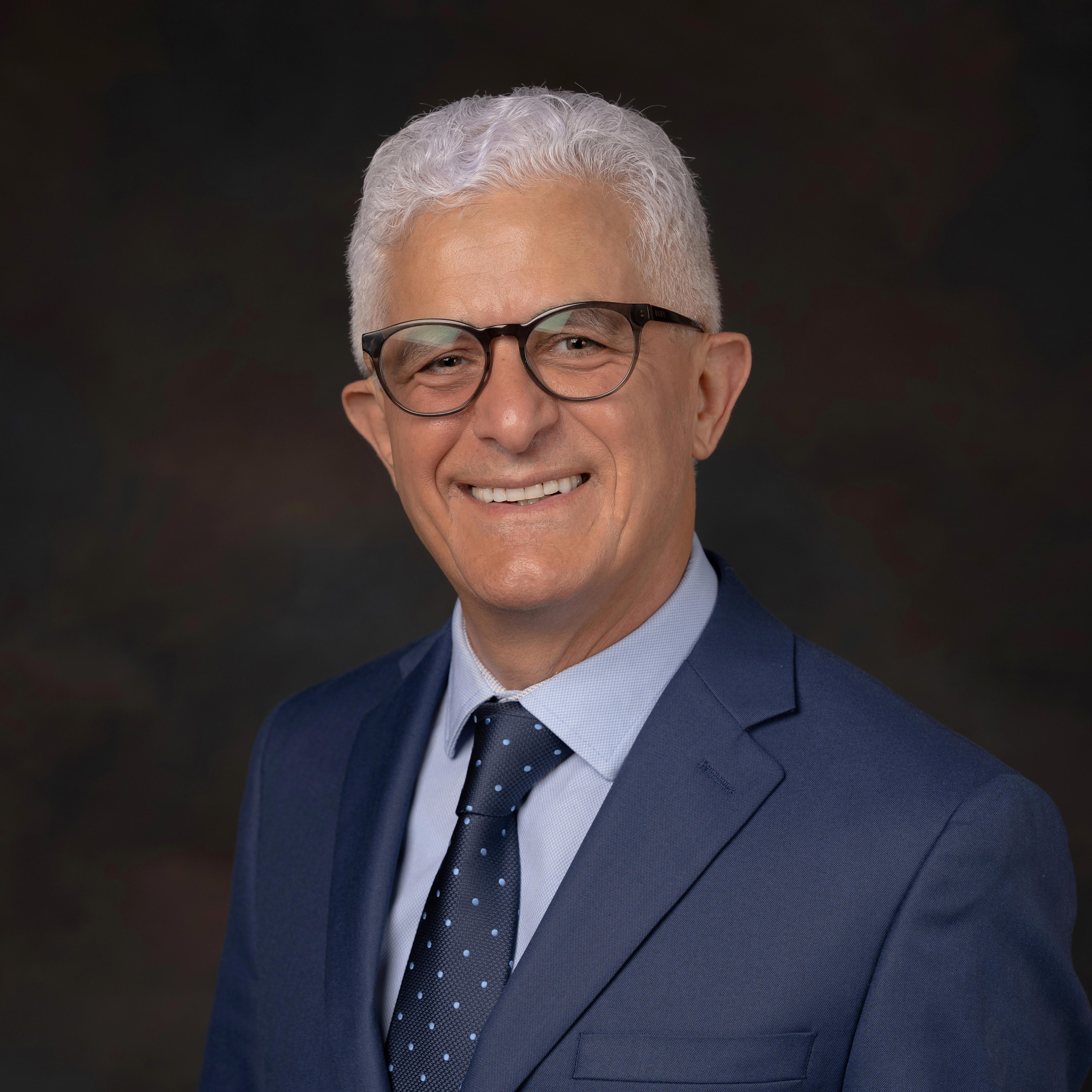
- Menachem Elimelech
- Born: Israel
- Education: Johns Hopkins University; Hebrew University of Jerusalem
- Awards: Member of National Academy of Engineering, Foreign member of Chinese Academy of Engineering, Elected member of Australian Academy of Technology and Engineering, Elected member of Canadian Academy of Engineering, Athalie Richardson Irvine Clarke Prize, ENI award, Prince Sultan bin Abdulaziz International Prize for Water, Lawrence K. Cecil Award of the American Institute of Chemical Engineers, Walter L. Huber Civil Engineering Research Prize of the American Society of Civil Engineers, Honorary doctorate Ben-Gurion University
- Scientific career
- Fields: Environmental engineering; Membrane technology; Desalination; Water-energy nexus
- Workplaces: Rice University; Yale University; University of California, Los Angeles
- Doctoral advisor: Charles R. O'Melia
- Doctoral students: Nathalie Tufenkji; Sharon Walker; Amy Childress; Eric Hoek

Menachem Elimelech (Hebrew: מְנַחֵם אֱלִימֶלֶךְ) is the Nancy and Clint Carlson Professor at Rice University, with joint appointments in the Department of Civil & Environmental Engineering and the Department of Chemical & Biomolecular Engineering. Prior to his appointment at Rice University, he was the Sterling Professor of Chemical and Environmental Engineering at Yale University. Elimelech moved from the University of California, Los Angeles (UCLA) to Yale University in 1998 and founded Yale's Environmental Engineering program.

Menachem Elimelech was elected a member of the National Academy of Engineering in 2006, and a foreign member of the Chinese Academy of Engineering in 2017, the Australian Academy of Technology and Engineering in 2021, the Canadian Academy of Engineering in 2022, and the National Academy of Engineering of Korea in 2022. He is recognized for his pioneering work on membrane processes for desalination and water reuse, materials for next-generation desalination and water purification membranes, membrane-based brine and wastewater management technologies, particle and microbial pathogen filtration, and environmental applications of nanotechnology. Several of his findings have become textbook materials and are applied to engineered systems.

== Early life and education ==
Elimelech was born in Israel to an immigrant family from Morocco. His parents had no formal education. His mother's family were Berber Jews who moved to Casablanca from the Sahara Desert. He grew up in the southern city of Beer Sheva in an immigrant absorption camp (Ma'abarot) and later in government subsidized housing. He attended elementary schools in the city and high school at the Ben Shemen Youth Village, an agricultural boarding school in central Israel.

Elimelech graduated with high distinction from the Hebrew University of Jerusalem with Bachelor of Science (BSc) in 1983 and Master of Science (MSc) in 1985. He earned his PhD in environmental engineering at the Johns Hopkins University in 1989 under the direction of Professor Charles R. O'Melia. His dissertation was titled "The Effect of Particle Size on the Kinetics of Deposition of Brownian Particles in Porous Media."

== Academic career ==
Following his PhD studies at the Johns Hopkins University, Elimelech accepted a faculty position as assistant professor in the Department of Civil and Environmental Engineering at UCLA. He rose to the rank of Associate Professor in 1994 and Full Professor in 1997. At UCLA, he also served as a Department Vice Chair.

In 1998, Elimelech accepted a position at the Chemical Engineering Department at Yale University as the Llewellyn West Jones Professor. After moving to Yale, he founded the Environmental Engineering Program. In 2005, he was appointed the Roberto Goizueta Professor and as the Chair of the Chemical Engineering Department (from 2005 to 2010). The Environmental Engineering program founded by Elimelech is currently part of the Department of Chemical and Environmental Engineering. In 2021, Elimelech was appointed the Sterling Professor of Chemical and Environmental Engineering. The Sterling professorship is the highest academic rank at Yale University. In January 2025, Elimelech joined Rice University as the Nancy and Clint Carlson Professor with joint appointments in the Department of Civil & Environmental Engineering and the Department of Chemical & Biomolecular Engineering.

== Contributions to science and technology ==
Elimelech is the author of over 600 refereed journal publications. He is the most cited and impactful scholar in the field of environmental and water quality engineering, with over 191,000 citations and an h-index of 229 (Google Scholar). Elimelech ranks first in the world in the field of Civil and Environmental Engineering in the latest (2025) ScholarGPS Highly Ranked Scholars list, which is based on research productivity and long-term scholarly impact.

=== Shaping the research agenda for desalination and water purification ===
Elimelech authored invited perspective articles that helped to shape the research and engineering practice in water purification and desalination. One example is an article in Nature (2008) on the state-of-the-art and future research on water purification. The article highlighted the science and technology being developed to improve the decontamination of water, as well as efforts to increase water supply through the safe reuse of wastewater and efficient desalination of seawater and brackish groundwater. Another example is an article in Science (2011) on the future of seawater desalination. The article analyzed the possible reductions in energy demand by state-of-the-art seawater desalination technologies, the potential role of advanced materials and innovative technologies in improving performance, and the sustainability of desalination as a solution to global water shortages. Another article published in Nature Reviews Materials (2016) focused on materials for next-generation desalination and water purification membranes. The article discussed the state-of-the-art existing membrane technologies for water purification and desalination, highlighted their inherent limitations, and established the urgent requirements for next-generation membranes.

=== Development of innovative membrane-based desalination technologies ===
Elimelech made contributions to the development of technologies for desalination and for the management of brines from inland desalination plants and industrial wastewaters, such as those produced in the oil and gas industry. Specifically, he advanced the use of ultrahigh-pressure reverse osmosis (UHPRO) as a technology to displace energy-intensive thermal evaporators that are commonly used for brine management). Elimelech has developed a membrane-based technology for concentrating brines, referred to as low-salt-rejection reverse osmosis (LSRRO). Through detailed process engineering modeling he has shown that LSRRO can concentrate brines up to approximately 240 g/L total dissolved solids (TDS), which is the feed brine concentration for brine crystallizers. UHPRO and LSRRO have attracted industrial interest as they are expected to revolutionize low-energy, low-cost brine management. Elimelech's pioneering research on another desalination technology, the forward osmosis (FO) process, has also impacted the water industry. The development of the FO process resulted in new commercial activity, as evidenced by the large number of FO patents and companies.

=== Advancing the field of membrane science ===
Elimelech provided molecular level understanding of fouling phenomena, which led to the development of fouling mitigation techniques. He introduced the concept of cake-enhanced osmotic pressure and biofilm-enhanced osmotic pressure as important mechanisms for water flux decline in salt-rejecting membranes, such as reverse osmosis and nanofiltration. He developed theories and models for concentration polarization in membrane separations, providing analytical expressions for predicting water flux. Professor Elimelech and collaborators also provided a mechanistic understanding of salt transport in reverse osmosis membranes, introducing the solution-friction model to describe the coupled transport of salt and water in reverse osmosis membranes. He has shown that the five-decades solution-diffusion mechanism for water transport in reverse osmosis membranes is fundamentally flawed. He has shown that water transport in reverse osmosis membranes is governed by a pore flow mechanism driven by a pressure gradient within the membrane, not by a concentration gradient of water as proposed by the solution-diffusion model. This finding has implications for the design of next-generation reverse osmosis desalination membranes.

=== Advancing the field of particle filtration and aggregation ===
Elimelech co-authored the book Particle Deposition & Aggregation: Measurement, Modeling and Simulation. Elimelech advanced the understanding of the transport of colloidal particles and microbial pathogens in subsurface porous media. The paramount role geochemical heterogeneity in the form of iron oxide coatings on mineral grains was introduced, verified in laboratory and field experiments, and incorporated in transport models. With Nathalie Tufenkji, Elimelech developed a predictive equation for particle removal in granular filtration, which is applicable to deep-bed filtration in water treatment, riverbank filtration, and transport of particles in subsurface environments. This equation, commonly referred to as the Tufenkji and Elimelech equation, has become textbook material and has been widely used in academia, industry, and government agencies.

=== Applications of nanomaterials to develop water filtration systems ===
Elimelech addressed challenges in water filtration and supply through the engineered application of nanomaterials. Specifically, he demonstrated the incorporation of nanomaterials into membrane technologies for fouling control, performance enhancement, and energy savings, as well as the development of point-of-use filters for virus removal and inactivation. Notable among his works is the demonstration and elucidation of the mechanisms of bacterial inactivation by carbon nanotubes and graphene oxide, which was later applied to membranes and water filtration. Elimelech also demonstrated that nanotechnology can offer solutions to water problems facing the developing world. Elimelech and his group developed a multiwalled carbon nanotube filter for the removal and inactivation of pathogenic viruses and bacteria from polluted waters. The carbon nanotube filter demonstrated complete removal of bacteria by sieving and over 99.99% removal and inactivation of viruses by depth-filtration.

=== Steering the membrane community to the right path ===
Elimelech has steered the membrane community to more relevant research that has direct impact on industry and humanity. He was the first to point out that research on ultrahigh water permeability reverse osmosis membranes will have negligible impact on energy consumption in desalination. Elimelech has shown that increasing water-salt selectivity (or salt rejection) would be much more beneficial. Elimelech demonstrated the relative insignificance of advanced materials in enhancing the energy efficiency of desalination technologies, while proposing more effective materials-based and process-level research directions. In addition to seawater desalination, Elimelech established the sweet spots for electrodialysis and reverse osmosis in brackish water desalination. Elimelech developed performance metrics for processes for harvesting energy from salinity gradient (blue energy), showing that such processes are viable only for very high salinity waters, much more than seawater. The conclusions of these studies and other related research had direct impact on funding agencies, thus directing research funds to more relevant research.

== Awards and honors ==
Year	Award	Awarding body	Notes	Ref
1989	Environmental Engineering and Chemistry Graduate Student Award	American Chemical Society	Division of Environmental Chemistry	
1990	Research Initiation Award	National Science Foundation		
1994	Engineering Teaching Excellence Award	W. M. Keck Foundation		
1996	Walter L. Huber Civil Engineering Research Prize	American Society of Civil Engineers		
2002	Outstanding Publication Award	Association of Environmental Engineering and Science Professors	With Charles O'Melia	
2004	Excellence in Review Award	Environmental Science & Technology		
2004	Graduate Mentor Award	Yale University		
2005	Athalie Richardson Irvine Clarke Prize	National Water Research Institute		
2006	Frontier of Research Award	Association of Environmental Engineering and Science Professors		
2006	Elected membership	National Academy of Engineering		
2007	Elected membership	Connecticut Academy of Science and Engineering		
2008	Lawrence K. Cecil Award in Environmental Chemical Engineering	The American Institute of Chemical Engineers		
2009	World Class University Professor	Korea University		
2009	Distinguished Visiting Fellowship	Royal Academy of Engineering	At the University of Edinburgh	
2010	Liza Cariaga-Lo Faculty Award for Diversity in Scholarship and Service	Yale University		
2011	The Simon W. Freese Environmental Engineering Award and Lecture	American Society of Civil Engineers		
2012	Outstanding Publication Award	Association of Environmental Engineering and Science Professors	With Amy Childress	
2012	Super Reviewer Award	Environmental Science & Technology		
2012	Postdoctoral Mentoring Prize	Yale University		
2012–present	Highly Cited Researcher	Clarivate (Web of Science)		
2014	Charles R. O'Melia Distinguished Educator Award	Association of Environmental Engineering and Science Professors		
2015	Eni Award: Protection of the Environment Prize	Eni		
2015	Distinguished Scholar	Chinese Academy of Sciences	Formerly known as "Einstein Professorship"	
2015	Elected Fellow	Association of Environmental Engineering and Science Professors		
2016	Distinguished Lecturer	Association of Environmental Engineering and Science Professors	2016-17 academic year	
2017	Elected membership	Chinese Academy of Engineering		
2019	Outstanding Publication Award	Association of Environmental Engineering and Science Professors	With Nathalie Tufenkji	
2019	Fulbright Scholar	Bureau of Educational and Cultural Affairs	At Ben Gurion University	
2021	Perry L. McCarty AEESP Founders' Award	Association of Environmental Engineering and Science Professors		
2021	Elected membership	Australian Academy of Technology and Engineering		
2022	Outstanding Achievements in Environmental Science and Technology Award	American Chemical Society		
2022	Prince Sultan bin Abdulaziz International Prize for Water: Alternative Water-Resources Prize	Sultan bin Abdulaziz		
2022	Elected membership	Canadian Academy of Engineering		
2022	Elected membership	National Academy of Engineering of Korea		
2023	Honorary doctorate	Ben-Gurion University		
2023	Membrane Technology Award	International Water Association (IWA)		
2024	Connecticut Medal of Technology	Connecticut Academy of Science and Engineering		
2024	Laureate Distinguished Fellow	International Engineering and Technology Institute (IETI)		
2025	Sydney Loeb Award	European Desalination Society		
2025	Distinguished Scholar	Membrane Society of Australasia		
2026	Honorary Professor	Tsinghua University		
2026	Honorary Professor	Tongji University		
2026	Elected membership	European Academy of Sciences and Arts		

== Mentoring of graduate students and postdocs ==
Elimelech has advised 58 PhD students and 60 postdoctoral researchers. In recognition of his excellence and dedication in teaching and mentoring, he received the W. M. Keck Foundation Engineering Teaching Excellence Award in 1994, the Yale University Graduate Mentoring Award in 2004, and the Yale University Postdoctoral Mentoring Prize in 2012.

Several of his advisees have won awards for their dissertations:

- Association of Environmental Engineering and Science Professors Outstanding Doctoral Dissertation Award (Doctoral Student Eric M.V. Hoek) (2002)
- American Water Work Association (AWWA) First Place Best Doctoral Dissertation Award (Doctoral Student Nathalie Tufenkji) (2006)
- American Water Work Association (AWWA), First Place Best Doctoral Dissertation Award (Doctoral Student Meagan Mauter) (2012)
- Association of Environmental Engineering and Science Professors Outstanding Doctoral Dissertation Award (Doctoral Student Ngai Yin Yip) (2015)
- Association of Environmental Engineering and Science Professors Outstanding Doctoral Dissertation Award (Doctoral Student Cody L. Ritt) (2023)

== Visiting professorships ==
- California Institute of Technology, 1996
- Swiss Federal Institute of Technology (ETH Zurich), 1997
- National University of Singapore, 2001, 2002
- Korea University, 2009, 2010
- University of Edinburgh, 2009
- Ben-Gurion University, Israel, 2019

== Representative advisory boards and committees ==
- Scientific Advisory Board, Zuckerberg Institute for Water Research, Ben-Gurion University, Israel, (2003-2020)
- National Academies Committee on Advancing Desalination Technologies (2006-2008)
- External Review Committee, Faculty of Civil and Environmental Engineering, Technion – Israel Institute of Technology, (2010)
- National Academies (Institute of Medicine) Committee on Blue Water Navy Vietnam Veterans and Agent Orange Exposure (2010-2013)
- Scientific Advisory Board, Singapore Centre on Environmental Life Sciences Engineering (SCELSE) (2010-2016)
- Chair, Scientific Advisory Board, Water Desalination and Reuse Center, KAUST (2012-2016)
- External Review Committee, Nanyang Environment & Water Research Institute (NEWRI), Nanyang Technological University, Singapore (2016)
- External Review Committee, Wetsus, European center of excellence for sustainable water technology, The Netherlands (2017)
- Scientific Advisory Board, Moroccan Foundation for Advanced Science, Innovation and Research (MAScIR), Morocco (2020–present)
- External Advisory Council, Andlinger Center for Energy and the Environment, Princeton University (2021–present)
