= George Tchobanoglous =

American environmental engineer

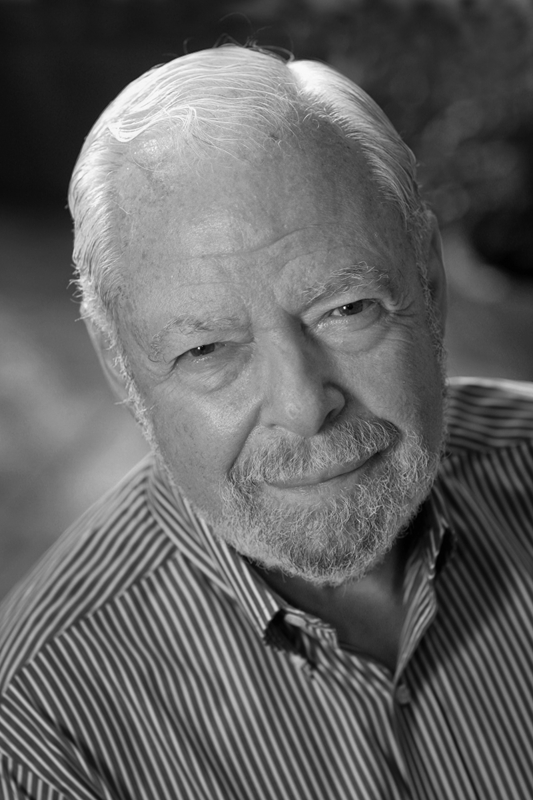
- Tchobanoglous in 2009
- Born: May 24, 1935 (age 91)
- Citizenship: US
- Education: BS from University of the Pacific; MS from UC Berkeley; PhD from Stanford University
- Known for: His textbooks and engineering reference books.
- Spouse: Rosemary Tchobanoglous
- Awards: Athalie Richardson Irvine Clarke Prize, 2003; National Academy of Engineering, 2004; Frederick George Pohland Medal, 2007; Elected Corresponding Member of the Academy of Athens, 2019
- Scientific career
- Fields: Environmental engineering
- Workplaces: University of California, Davis campus

Notes
- former-president of Association of Environmental Engineering and Science Professors

George Tchobanoglous (born May 24, 1935) is an American civil and environmental engineer, writer and professor.

== Biography ==
George Tchobanoglous was born in the United States to Greek immigrant parents. He received a BS in civil engineering from the University of the Pacific, an MS in sanitary engineering from the University of California, Berkeley, and a PhD in environmental engineering from Stanford University. Rolf Eliassen was his PhD adviser at Stanford.

He joined the faculty of the University of California, Davis, in 1970 and remained there for the rest of his professional career, teaching courses on water and wastewater treatment and solid waste management. He has said "the University has basically been my life." He is now a professor emeritus in the university's Department of Civil and Environmental Engineering.

He is a former president of the Association of Environmental Engineering and Science Professors.

Tchobanoglous and his wife, Rosemary Ash Tchobanoglous, are the parents of three daughters.

== Research ==
Tchobanoglous' principal research interests are in the general areas of wastewater treatment, water reuse, and solid waste management.

In the 1970s he studied the use of constructed wetlands for wastewater treatment. One application of his findings was in his assistance to the city of San Diego in establishing an aquaculture facility that remained in use for more than 20 years. For the California Department of Transportation (Caltrans) he directed the development of a series of four regional guidance manuals on the restoration, rehabilitation, and creation of salt marshes.

Tchobanoglous' investigations of filtration technologies for wastewater treatment led to California state approval of five alternative technologies in addition to the two conventional technologies that had been approved as of the early 1970s.

His work in the use of ultraviolet radiation for wastewater disinfection began in the early 1990s, when he investigated the potential to use UV to disinfect wastewater in order to reclaim it for reuse. Guidelines for UV disinfection that he helped to draft in 1993 became "the standard" U.S. resource on this topic and helped foster the acceptance of UV disinfection as a technology for water reuse.

In the 2000s, Tchobanoglous focused his attention on decentralized wastewater management, delivering numerous speeches on the challenge of providing effective systems to collect, treat, and reuse or disperse wastewater produced in locations where it is not practicable to provide sanitary sewers and centralized wastewater treatment.

== Students ==
Tchobanoglous has advised many of the students that have become thought leaders on their own, including:

Harold Leverenz, (PhD 2008) - currently a researcher at UC Davis
David Austin, (MS 1996) - currently with Jacobs Engineering Group
Dave Maciolek, (MS 1995) - currently with Aqua Nova Engineering

== Publications ==
Tchobanoglous is the author or coauthor of over 650 publications, including 27 textbooks, and 8 engineering reference books. His textbooks are in use in more than 225 U.S. educational institutions.

He also provided editorial consulting for the book series Water Resources and Environmental Engineering, from McGraw-Hill and provides national and international consulting for governments and private companies.

== Presentations ==
He has given more than 675 technical presentations, with more than 450 as an invited or keynote speaker, in the United States and abroad, including Africa, Asia, Europe, the Middle East, and South America. During the last 10 years most of the presentations have been invited lectures or Keynote Addresses.

== Awards ==
Tchobanoglous received the Athalie Richardson Irvine Clarke Prize from National Water Research Institute in 2003. In 2004, he was awarded the Distinguished Service Award for Research and Education in Integrated Waste Management from the Waste-to-energy Research and Technology Council and was inducted into the National Academy of Engineering. In 2005, he was awarded an honorary doctorate by the Colorado School of Mines. In 2006, he was the Distinguished Lecturer for the Department of Civil, Architectural and Environmental Engineering, University of Texas, Austin, Texas. In 2007, he received the Frederick George Pohland Medal awarded by American Academy of Environmental Engineers and the Association of Environmental Engineering and Science Professors. In 2017, he received Honorary Doctor of Engineering Degrees from the Technical University of Crete, Greece and Aristotle University of Thessaloniki, Greece. In 2019, he was elected Corresponding Member of the Academy of Athens.

=== George and Rosemary Tchobanoglous Fellowship ===
In 1999, the University of California, Davis, established an endowed fellowship for graduate students in environmental engineering, named for George and Rosemary Tchobanoglous. The fellowship is awarded to students working toward master's degrees without an expectation of candidacy for a doctorate. Tchobanoglous has supported the fellowship through donations. The focus on master's degree students is based on Tchobanoglous' concern that these students often lack access to the financial resources that are available to PhD students who can obtain funding by writing their own research proposals.

== Selected books ==
Sole author

- Wastewater management. Gale Research Co., 1976
- Solid wastes. McGraw-Hill, 1977
- Solutions manual to accompany Metcalf & Eddy, Inc. McGraw-Hill, 1979
- Wastewater engineering, treatment, disposal, reuse Solutions manual to accompany Metcalf & Eddy, Inc. McGraw-Hill, 1979
- Wastewater engineering, treatment, disposal, reuse. McGraw-Hill, 1979
- Water quality. Addison-Wesley, 1985
- Wastewater Engineering. Mcgraw-Hill College, November 1990
- Integrated solid waste management. McGraw-Hill, 1993

With others

- Wastewater Engineering Treatment Disposal Reuse by George Tchobanoglous and Metcalf & Eddy. McGraw-Hill Companies, 1991
- Wastewater Engineering by George Tchobanoglous and H. David Stensel. McGraw-Hill Science/Engineering/Math, 2002
- Handbook of Solid Waste Management by George Tchobanoglous and Frank Kreith. McGraw-Hill Professional, 2002
- Water Reuse by George Tchobanoglous, Metcalf & Eddy, Inc. an AECOM Company, Takashi Asano, Franklin L. Burton, Harold L. Leverenz and Ryujiro Tsuchihashi. McGraw-Hill Professional, 2007
