= Lynskey =

Lynskey is an Irish surname. Notable people with this surname include:

- Aoife Lynskey (born 1980), Irish camogie player
- Alice Lynskey, Irish musician
- Brendan Lynskey (born 1956), Irish former athlete
- Dorian Lynskey, British author and podcaster
- Ed Lynskey, American poet, critic, and novelist
- George Lynskey (1888–1957), English judge
- Jeffrey Lynskey (born 1977), Irish hurling manager
- Melanie Lynskey (born 1977), New Zealand actress
- Michael Lynskey, New Zealand academic

Companies with this name include:

- Lynskey Performance Designs

== See also ==
- Linskey
