= Amy Childress =

American civil and environmental engineer

- Occupations: Professor of Civil and Environmental Engineering

Academic background
- Education: University of Maryland (BS) University of California, Los Angeles (MS) University of California, Los Angeles (PhD)

Academic work
- Discipline: Civil and Environmental Engineering
- Sub-discipline: Desalination, water treatment, and water reuse
- Institutions: University of Southern California

Amy Childress is an American professor. She is Dean's Professor of Civil and Environmental Engineering at the University of Southern California's Viterbi School of Engineering, Director of USC's ReWater Center and Academic Lead for the Water Reuse Consortium. Childress is recognized for her work on membrane technologies used for desalination and wastewater reuse and her ability to translate research results and other scientific and engineering knowledge into guidance on implementation of advanced water projects in the U.S. and abroad. She is a Fellow of the Association of Environmental Engineering and Science professors (AEESP) and a Fulbright U.S. Scholar. In 2024 Childress was named the Athalie Richardson Irvine Clarke Prize Laureate by the National Water Research Institute (NWRI).

== Early life and education ==
Childress graduated from the University of Maryland in 1992 with a B.S. degree in civil engineering. A paper based on her undergraduate research at the USDA Agricultural Research Service Hydrology Laboratory won the Journal of the American Water Resources Association William R. Boggess Award in 1994. Upon graduation, Childress was awarded a fellowship from the University of California, Los Angeles where she earned a master's degree and PhD in civil and environmental engineering. Her PhD research on the characterization of nanofiltration and reverse osmosis membranes was carried out under the supervision of Professor Menachem Elimelech. A paper from this research was awarded the 2012 AEESP Outstanding Paper Award as a "landmark environmental engineering and science paper that has withstood the test of time and significantly influenced the practice of environmental engineering and science."

== Career ==
Childress joined the faculty of the Department of Civil and Environmental Engineering at the University of Nevada, Reno in 1997 where she was tenured in 2002. She rose to the rank of Professor and became chair of the department in 2008. Her accomplishments during her time at the University of Nevada, Reno include a National Science Foundation CAREER Award, and being selected as a speaker at the US National Academies Frontiers of Engineering Symposium in 2007. Childress served as President of AEESP from 2008 to 2009 and was a founding member of the AEESP Foundation. In 2011 she spoke at the First Arab-American Frontiers of Sciences, Engineering, and Medicine Symposium in Kuwait City.

In 2013, Childress accepted a position in the Sonny Astani Department of Civil and Environmental Engineering at USC's Viterbi School of Engineering as Professor and Director of environmental engineering. In 2014 she was an invited speaker at the US National Academies Roundtable on Science and Technology Sustainability. She was Gabilan Distinguished Professor In Science and Engineering from 2019 to 2022. Childress was appointed to the USEPA Science Advisory Board in 2021 after having served on the Drinking Water Committee. In 2023 she became the founding Director of USC's Center for Water Resource Recovery (the Rewater Center). She currently serves on expert advisory panels for U.S. water infrastructure projects and previously served on the Singapore Public Utilities Board's external audit panel.
