= Linskey =

Linskey is a surname. Notable people with the surname include:

- Frank Linskey (1913–1999), American basketball player and coach
- Howard Linskey (born 1967), British novelist and former journalist

== See also ==
- Liney
- Linsky
- Lynskey
