= Hans van Leeuwen =

Educator, engineer and inventor (born 1946)

- Born: 1946 (age 79–80); Gouda, South Holland, Netherlands
- Other names: J. van Leeuwen, Johannes van Leeuwen
- Education: University of Pretoria
- Employer: Iowa State University
- Known for: Research

Johannes "Hans" van Leeuwen (born 1946 in Gouda, South Holland) is an educator, engineer, inventor, researcher, and entrepreneur. He is an emeritus professor of Civil, Construction and Environmental Engineering at Iowa State University and an entrepreneur in ethanol co-product development. His research and innovations have worked to solve various engineering problems including, new water purification methods, a way of creating food and animal feed from waste, prevention of introducing feral species to coastal waters and a process in making the purest alcohol ever made.

== Early life and education ==
van Leeuwen was born in 1946 in Gouda, South Holland, Netherlands. He grew up in South Africa. His experience growing up in South Africa helped him understand the plight of the underprivileged living in developing countries and inspired his later work. He studied at University of Pretoria in South Africa and received his B.S. in 1975 in Chemical Engineering, his M.S. in 1979 in Engineering and Water Utilization, a Graduate Diploma of Tertiary Education in 1983 and a Doctorate in Environmental Engineering in 1988.

== Research ==
van Leeuwen's early research was focused on water reclamation from wastewater. His research included the recovery of byproducts from liquid wastes and sediments, fungal treatment of food processing wastewater, and reuse applications of residues from water softening. He has several patents to his name. He was able to extend the life of activated carbon at least 7 times by using a microbial process. As of 2009, this process was being used at the Goreangab Walter Reclamation Plant in Windhoek, Khomas Region, Namibia and at the South Caboolture Water Reclamation plant in Caboolture, Queensland, Australia.

He worked on a ships ballast water treatment project with Darren Oemcke at James Cook University, Australia, Jake Perrins and Bill Cooper of the University of California, Irvine; and Russ Herwig of the University of Washington, Seattle. They developed a way to keep exotic species (such as zebra mussels) out of coastal waters through the disinfestation of ballast water with bromine produced from bromide naturally occurring in seawater through rapid ozonation to avoid spreading feral species. As of 2009, this innovation is now being used in international shipping. More than 400 ships worldwide have now been equipped with technology using the patents of van Leeuwen et al. tankers.

Van Leeuwen's MycoMax process works by cultivating microbial filamentous fungi on leftovers from ethanol fermentation and distillation in order to create a high quality animal feed. Growing fungus on the leftover corn found in ethanol production, provides for good energy feed for livestock animals (such as pigs and chickens), but can also reduce energy costs. More importantly, the fungal biomass can serve as a source of valuable biochemicals, such as chitin, amino acids and bio-oils. Chitin, in turn, can be converted to chitosan and glucosamine, both valuable chemicals used in medicine, agriculture and water treatment.

Van Leeuwen's Mycofuel process is a two-stage bioconversion process in order to create bio-oil or biofuel from leftover plant matter. This process could be a more sustainable and cost-effective alternative process to making ethanol from various plant materials, This was work done in collaboration at Iowa State University with various colleagues and graduate students.

His physical-chemical alcohol purification process has found application in the production of an impurity-free vodka in Iowa, IngeniOz, by Oz Spirits, LLC, a company owned by him.

Van Leeuwen also developed a selective oxidation process for use within activated sludge. Ozone is used to oxidize undesirable compounds, of which the oxidation byproducts are then biodegraded. All this within the same microbial biomass, without upsetting the delicate balance between the various benevolent bacteria that are at the heart of the biological purification process as used in community and industrial wastewater treatment.

== Teaching ==
He is an emeritus professor in the Department of Civil, Construction and Environmental Engineering at Iowa State University (ISU) in Ames, Iowa. He started as a professor at ISU in 2000. Together with professor Balaji Narasimhan, he was awarded a Vlasta Klima Balloun Professorship at Iowa State University in 2010. Previously he had been a professor at the University of New England, Australia, Griffith University, Australia, and the University of Pretoria.

== Awards and honors ==
- 2007 – Ethanol purification with ozonation and activated carbon, Grand Prize University Research, American Academy of Environmental Engineers
- 2008 – MycoMax fungal process for additional ethanol plant coproduct, R&D 100 Awards, R&D Magazine
- 2008 – Fungal process for ethanol plant stillage beneficiation, Grand Prize University Research, American Academy of Environmental Engineers
- 2009 – Bio-oil from an integrated fungal lignocellulosic biorefinery, Grand Prize University Research, American Academy of Environmental Engineers
- 2009 – Innovator of the Year, R&D Magazine
- 2009 – Award for Outstanding Achievement in Research, Iowa State University, Ames, Iowa
- 2009 – Mycofuel fungal process for biodiesel from processing wastes, R&D 100 Awards, R&D Magazine
- 2011 – Honor Award, Fungal pilot plant for animal feed production, Grand Prize University Research, American Academy of Environmental Engineers
- 2012 – Global Grand Prize for Project Innovation Awards in Applied Research, International Water Association (IWA)
