= Charles Haas =

Charles Haas may refer to:

- Charles Haas (1832–1902), French art expert and dandy, role model for Proust's novel hero Charles Swann in In Search of Lost Time
- Charles A. Haas, author and Titanic expert
- Charles F. Haas (1913–2011), American film and television director
- Charles N. Haas (born 1951), American environmental engineering professor
- Charles S. Haas (born 1952), American screenwriter, actor and novelist
- Charlie Haas (born 1972), American professional wrestler
