= Household hazardous waste =

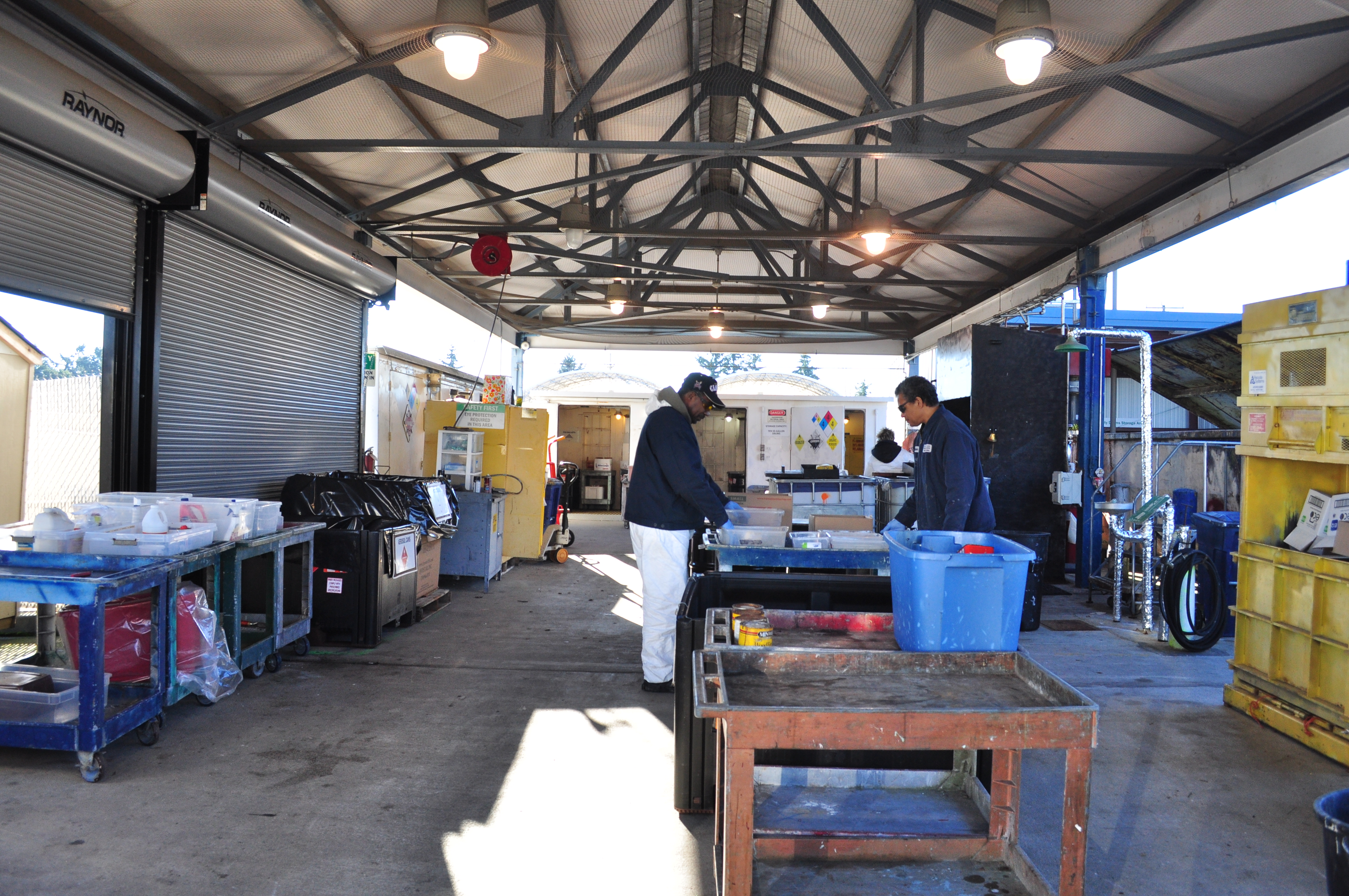
A household hazardous waste collection center in Seattle, Washington, U.S.

Household hazardous waste (HHW) was a term coined by Dave Galvin from Seattle, Washington in 1982 as part of the fulfillment of a US EPA grant. This new term was reflective of the recent passage of the Resource Conservation and Recovery Act of 1976 (RCRA 1976) in the US. This act and subsequent regulations strengthened the environmental protection requirements for landfills, in Subpart D, and created a "cradle to grave" management system for hazardous wastes, in Subpart C. From RCRA 1976 the US EPA promulgated rules in 1980 which explicitly excluded any wastes from household origins from regulation as a hazardous waste at the federal level. Most US states adopted parallel regulations to RCRA 1976 but were allowed to be more stringent. California took advantage of this allowance and chose to not exempt household origin wastes from their state hazardous waste laws. HHW products exhibit many of the same dangerous characteristics as fully regulated hazardous waste which are their potential for reactivity, ignitability, corrosivity, toxicity, or persistence. Examples include drain cleaners, oil paint, motor oil, antifreeze, fuel, poisons, pesticides, herbicides and rodenticides, fluorescent lamps, lamp ballasts containing PCBs, some smoke detectors, and in some states, consumer electronics (such as televisions, computers, and cell phones). Except for California, most states exclude HHW from their hazardous waste regulations and regulate the management of HHW largely under their solid waste regulatory schemes.

Certain items such as batteries and fluorescent lamps can be returned to retail stores for disposal. The Call2Recycle maintains a list of battery recycling locations and your local environmental organization should have list of fluorescent lamp recycling locations. The classification "household hazardous waste" has been used for decades and does not accurately reflect the larger group of materials that during the past several years have become known as "household hazardous wastes". These include items such as latex paint, non-hazardous household products and other items that do not generally exhibit hazardous characteristics which are routinely included in "household hazardous waste" disposal programs. The term "home generated special materials" more accurately identifies a broader range of items that public agencies are targeting as recyclable and/or should not be disposed of into a landfill.

== United States ==
HHW is not regulated by the EPA. Many states and local solid waste management departments have created and funded Household Hazardous Waste collection programs to offer safe disposal options. These programs may include home collection service, permanent facilities and one day collection events.

Most U.S. states and federal regulations continue to permit homeowner disposal of household hazardous waste into the solid waste stream, although some state and local agencies are increasingly banning certain HHW from solid waste disposal.

The most extensive overview of this topic including history, policy and technical issues is contained in the 2018 book Handbook on Household Hazardous Waste (2nd Ed.), Amy Cabaniss, Editor. An additional HHW overview resource is in Chapter 10 of the Handbook of Solid Waste Management, George Tchobanoglous and Frank Kreith, Editors. A more recent (2022) compilation of 30 articles regarding HHW policy and technical issues in the US is found in the Chronicle of the HHW Corner.

The professional organization most focused on HHW issues is the North American Hazardous Materials Management Association, NAHMMA. NAHMMA has chapters in many states, holds an annual conference, provides training and offers professional publications. In collaboration with the Solid Waste Association of North America (SWANA) NAHMMA offers certification to HHW collection program professionals. Occasional or periodic HHW collection events at temporary sites and permanent HHW collection facilities are common in many communities. The HHW Collection Facility Design Guide has been used by many communities to develop permanent collection facilities in the US.

=== State regulation ===
In Florida, and in other United States states, responsibility for proper disposal of HHW falls upon the generator. Some states allow collection of small business hazardous wastes at the same location as household hazardous wastes. However, it is more common for public collection facilities to limit hazardous waste collection to households. In 1992 the US EPA issued a policy that allowed the option to collect and mix household hazardous wastes with conditionally exempt hazardous wastes from small businesses. This has encouraged a trend of local collection programs evolving from household hazardous waste only to also include small business hazardous waste collection.

California has introduced an Electronic Waste Recycling Act. While most states recognize the exemption for home generated hazardous waste in 40 CFR, California has established Section 25218 of the Health and Safety Code to regulate all aspects of home generated special materials (HHW). 25218 details the types of programs e.g. Door-to-Door, Permanent HHW Collection Facilities, Mobile Collection Events, etc. Public agencies must sponsor (as the generator) all HHW programs as their EPA ID number is used. All HHW programs are monitored by DTSC and/or the local CUPA organization. A Permit-by-Rule must be obtained from DTSC or the CUPA before implementing most HHW collection activities.

HHW programs has introduced the Covered Device Recycling Act.

== European Union ==
Similar regulations, such as the Waste Electrical and Electronic Equipment Directive are being introduced in the countries of the European Union.

== See also ==
- Hazardous waste
- Product stewardship
