= Jerome Nriagu =

Nigerian American environmental chemist

Jerome Okon Nriagu
- Born: October 24, 1942 (age 84); Ora-eri Town, Anambra, Nigeria
- Occupations: Environmental chemist, academic and researcher
- Awards: Elected a Fellow of the Royal Society of Canada (FRSC); Miroslaw Romanowski Medal; Distinguished Service Award, International Union of Geosciences; Alexander von Humboldt Distinguished Research Award; Honorary Doctor of Science Degree, University of Alberta

Academic background
- Education: B.Sc. (Honors), Geology; M.S., Geochemistry; Ph.D., Geochemistry; D.Sc., Environmental Biogeochemistry
- Alma mater: University of Ibadan; University of Wisconsin–Madison; University of Toronto

Academic work
- Institutions: Environment Canada; University of Michigan

Jerome Okon Nriagu is a Nigerian-born American environmental chemist, academician, and researcher. He is professor emeritus in the School of Public Health at the University of Michigan. He was formerly a Research Scientist at Environment Canada in the former National Water Research Institute, Burlington, Ontario, and an Adjunct Professor in the Department of Earth Sciences, University of Waterloo, Canada.

His research has included global inventories of atmospheric trace-metal emissions; the biogeochemistry of lead, mercury, arsenic, cadmium and other metals; environmental exposure assessment; and environmental justice. He has authored or edited about 30 books and more than 300 scientific articles. His work was listed among the most-cited research in environmental studies and ecology during the 2000–2008 period and, in 2024/2025, was among the top-ranked researchers in the fields of Trace Metals and Environmental Health Sciences according to an AI analysis by ScholarGPS.com.

== Education ==
Nriagu was born in Ora-eri Town in what is now Anambra State, Nigeria. He completed his high school at Government College Umuahia

Nriagu graduated with a B.Sc. (Honors) degree in geology from the University of Ibadan in Nigeria in 1965. He did his graduate training in low-temperature geochemistry with an MS degree from the University of Wisconsin in 1967 and his Ph.D. in 1970, from the University of Toronto in Canada. In 1987, he received the first academic research D.Sc. degree ever awarded by the University of Ibadan for an outstanding body of work in the field of Environmental Biogeochemistry.

== Career ==
=== Environment Canada ===
After completing his doctorate, Nriagu joined Canada's federal Department of the Environment in 1972 as a research scientist at the National Water Research Institute in Burlington, Ontario. He remained there until 1993 and left as a senior research scientist.

Nriagu began his career in Canada with research on the sources and fate of toxic metals in the Great Lakes and other aquatic systems. His work subsequently expanded to include atmospheric deposition, acid-sensitive lakes, and anthropogenic modification of global cycling of trace metals. He also held adjunct appointments at the University of Waterloo, serving in its Department of Earth Sciences from 1985 to 1995 and its Department of Biology from 2000 to 2005.

Nriagu served on many national and international scientific committees during this period, including panels concerned with lead, trace elements, sulfur cycling and environmental analytical chemistry. He was also involved with the National Academy of Sciences panel on lead in the human environment and served on various Scientific Committees on Problems of the Environment (SCOPE) of the United Nations Environmental Program (UNEP).

=== University of Michigan ===
Nriagu joined the University of Michigan's School of Public Health in 1993 as a professor of environmental chemistry in the Department of Environmental and Industrial Health. He subsequently held a research professorship at the Center for Human Growth and Development as the Director of the Minority Health & Health Disparities Research Training Program (MHIRT) for 12 years. He remains an Affiliate of the university's Center for Afro-American and African Studies.

He directed the Environmental Health Sciences Program in his department from 1996 into the 2000s and later was Director of the Environmental Quality and Health Program from 2010 to 2013. His work at Michigan combined environmental chemistry with public-health research, particularly the assessment of human exposure to metals and the study of environmental health disparities.

Nriagu retired from the University of Michigan in 2013 and was named professor emeritus of environmental chemistry and research professor emeritus at the Center for Human Growth and Development.

== Research ==
Nriagu's contributions to knowledge center on three domains of environmental health science: sources, behavior, and fate of toxic metals in natural and contaminated environments; disproportionate exposure of minority and low-income communities to environmental pollutants (environmental injustice); and specific problems of environmental metal pollution in the developing countries. His research on emissions of trace metals from natural and anthropogenic sources at the local, regional, and global scales is the most widely recognized and cited.

=== Global cycling of trace metals ===
Among Nriagu's most widely cited early contributions were quantitative studies of the global atmospheric cycling of trace metals. In a 1979 paper in Nature, he estimated natural and anthropogenic emissions of trace metals to the atmosphere.

In 1988, Nriagu and Jozef M. Pacyna published a quantitative assessment of worldwide contamination of air, water and soils by trace metals. The study estimated the metal loading rates into major environmental compartments and concluded that human activities had substantially altered the concentrations of many trace elements in environmental media worldwide and were influencing their global and regional cycles. The inventory of atmospheric emissions from natural sources was published the following year.

=== Great Lakes and environmental geochemistry ===
A large part of Nriagu's early research concerned the Great Lakes and contamination of aquatic ecosystems with toxic metals. His work examined the deposition and chemical speciation of metals in lake water and sediments, atmospheric inputs, the effects of industrial emissions, and the retention of contaminants in sediments. He also investigated the use of isotope measurements to identify pollution sources. Nriagu's work on the formation and stability of heavy metal phosphates in soils and sediments during this time contributed to subsequent in-situ approaches for immobilizing lead in contaminated soils and sediments, and reducing lead in tap water by adding small amounts of phosphate ions in the water distribution system.

=== Lead and historical environmental pollution ===
Nriagu has written extensively on the history of human exposure to lead. His book Lead and Lead Poisoning in Antiquity, published in 1983, examined the production and uses of lead in ancient societies and the health consequences of lead exposure.

A chapter in the book was devoted to unusual exposure of Roman aristocrats to lead and the traits that could be symptomatic of lead poisoning. His paper in the New England Journal of Medicine examined the prevalence of gout as being symptomatic of lead exposure among Roman aristocrats and proposed that lead poisoning may have played a role in the decline of the Roman Empire. The proposed connection between lead exposure and the decline of the Roman Empire has remained controversial.Although the Fall of Rome can be attributed to many immediate factors, the consequences of underlying harm from the deeply embedded lead in Roman life and environment remain an active topic of investigation.

Nriagu also studied historical sources of mercury pollution. His 1994 study quantified the release of mercury from silver and gold mining in the Americas during the colonial era and pointed to the fact that the legacy pollution is being redistributed across the Globe.

=== Human exposure and environmental health ===
Beginning in the 1990s, Nriagu's research increasingly incorporated environmental epidemiology and biomarker measurements in blood, urine, saliva, and other biological samples, as well as the chemical forms of arsenic in groundwater and food. His research group has investigated exposure to heavy metals among children of minority and low-income communities in and around Detroit and Saginaw, Michigan, and among disadvantaged populations in South Africa, Mongolia and Nigeria. Nriagu’s research included the relationships between metal exposure, respiratory health, and associated environmental and socioeconomic risk factors among children in Saginaw, Michigan.

His work on arsenic exposome has included determination of the forms of this element in drinking water, groundwater, and food as well as assessments of the biomarkers of exposure and effects. With collaborators in India, he worked on the then-epidemic of arsenic poisoning in West Bengal, with the emphasis being on arsenic intake from drinking water and rice consumption, and the evaluation of arsenic species in saliva as biomarkers of exposure and effect. A 2022 review co-authored by Nriagu examined epigenetic changes associated with arsenic exposure and discussed possible mechanisms linking arsenic exposure to bladder cancer and other health effects.

=== Environmental health in developing countries ===
Nriagu has conducted research and training activities in Africa, Asia, Latin America and the Caribbean. His work in this area has focused on the risks of exposure to toxic metals from industrial, unusual environmental, and traditional sources.

His 1992 paper Toxic Metal Pollution in Africa was the first to comprehensively examine the environmental and public-health implications of increasing contamination of the continent with toxic metals.

In Brazil, Nriagu and collaborators investigated mercury pollution associated with gold mining, while studies of Lake Victoria examined mercury concentrations in water, sediment and biota. His work has also examined lead poisoning of children in Nigeria and South Africa, arsenic exposure in South Asia, mercury pollution associated with artisanal mining in Ghana, and heavy metals as a risk factor for male infertility in Lebanon.

In 2005, Nriagu collaborated with colleagues at the University of California, Santa Cruz in using stable lead isotope technique to assess lead contamination at the cocoa-producing sources and during the chocolate manufacturing process. This was among the first quantitative estimates of the natural background concentration of lead in chocolate candies.

=== Trace metals and infectious diseases ===
In 2015, Nriagu and Eric P. Skaar edited Trace Metals and Infectious Diseases, a volume published by MIT Press as part of the Strüngmann Forum Reports series. The volume brought together work from environmental health, toxicology, microbiology, immunology, nutrition and related disciplines and examined the relationships between metal deficiency or excess and infectious disease. Individual chapters provided comprehensive reviews of the mechanisms of interaction between trace-metal nutrition, metal toxicity, host–microbe infectivity, and resulting pathologies.

=== Later research ===
Nriagu continued to publish and collaborate after he retired from the University of Michigan. In 2023, he published a Nature News & Views article marking 60 years since the publication of research by Clair Patterson demonstrating that environmental lead pollution was a global phenomenon. The article highlighted the paper as a critical step in dismantling the hegemonic control over environmental lead research by the lead industry. He was also a co-author of a 2023 study on strategies for reducing community exposure to arsenic and cadmium in rice by changing the combined effects of irrigation, fertilizer application, and microbial communities on the uptake of the two metals by rice plants.Another 2023 study involving Nriagu investigated the association between cadmium exposure and prostate cancer among Nigerian men and examined whether zinc status modified the association. In 2025, Nriagu co-authored a paper in Science that assessed global soil pollution by toxic metals as a threat to food safety and human health. The study found that 14-17% of the cropland has been affected by metal pollution globally and that 0.9-1.4 billion people live in regions of heightened public health and ecological risks.

== Editorial work ==
Nriagu was the Editor, and then Editor-in-Chief of the Science of the Total Environment for over 20 years, and has served on the editorial boards of many journals. He was the Editor-in-Chief of Encyclopedia of Environmental Health in 7 volumes published by Elsevier in 2019, the founding editor of Advances in Environmental Science & Technology (book series) by Wiley, and Topics in Environmental Health (book series by Elsevier.

== Awards and honors ==
- 1988 – Frank Rigler Medal, Canadian Society of Limnologists
- 1992 – Elected a Fellow of the Royal Society of Canada (FRSC)
- 1992 – King/Chavez/Park Visiting Professorship, University of Michigan School of Public Health.
- 1999 – Miroslaw Romanowski Medal, Royal Society of Canada, shared with Howard Roy Krouse.
- 2002 – Senior Fulbright Fellowship at the University of the West Indies, Jamaica
- 2004 – Outstanding Scientist/Excellence in Research Award, University of Michigan School of Public Health.
- 2005 – Distinguished Service Award, International Union of Geosciences Commission on Geoscience for Environmental Management.
- 2009 – Alexander von Humboldt Distinguished Research Award.
- 2012 – Lifetime Achievement Award, International Conferences on Heavy Metals in the Environment
- 2013 – Distinguished Alumni Award, University of Ibadan.
- 2016 – Honorary Doctor of Science Degree, University of Alberta

== Bibliography ==
- The Biogeochemistry of Mercury in the Environment (1979) ISBN 978-0444801104
- Nickel in the Environment (Advances in Environmental Science and Technology) (1980) ISBN 978-0471058854
- Cadmium in the Environment (1981) ISBN 978-0471064558
- Lead and Lead Poisoning in Antiquity (1983) ISBN 978-0471087670
- Toxic Metals in the Atmosphere (1986) ISBN 978-0471826545
- Chromium in the Natural and Human Environment (1988) ISBN 978-0471856436
- Arsenic in the Environment (1994) ISBN 978-0471112310
- Vanadium in the Environment (19xxx) ISBN 978-0471177784
- Thallium in the Environment (1998) ISBN 978-0471177555
- Mineral Components in Foods (Chemical & Functional Properties of Food Components) (2007) ISBN 978-0849322341
- Trace Metals and Infectious Diseases (2015) ISBN 978-0262029193
