= Debra Reinhart =

American environmental engineer

Debra R. Reinhart is an American environmental engineer specializing in waste treatment, including bioreactors, and sustainability for landfills. She is retired from the University of Central Florida as Pegasus Professor of Engineering Emerita.

== Education and career ==
Reinhart began her university education studying for a mathematics degree at Rollins College in Florida from 1972 to 1974. However, after being inspired to go into engineering by her science classes at Rollins, she transferred to Florida Technological University (now the University of Central Florida) and completed a bachelor's degree in engineering, summa cum laude, in 1976. She went to Georgia Tech for graduate study in sanitary and environmental engineering, earning a master's degree in 1980 and completing her Ph.D. in 1989.

She worked as a civil engineer in Atlanta, Georgia from 1976 until 1986, including a five-year stint as chief of research and development for the Atlanta Bureau of Pollution Control. On completing her doctorate, she became an assistant professor of environmental engineering at the University of Central Florida in 1989. She was promoted to associate professor in 1994 and full professor in 2000, and became the university's assistant vice president for research in 2008. She was named Pegasus Professor in 2009. From 2011 to 2013 she was a program director for environmental engineering at the National Science Foundation. She retired in 2021.

In her retirement, she became a Fulbright Scholar in Kyrgyzstan, providing expertise in waste management to the city of Bishkek.

== Recognition ==
Reinhart is a Fellow of the American Association for the Advancement of Science, a Fellow of the American Society of Civil Engineers, and a Fellow of the Association of Environmental Engineering and Science Professors.

She was the 2014 recipient of the Stanley E. Kappe Award of the American Academy of Environmental Engineers and Scientists (AAEES) and in 2018, she became the first woman to win the AAEES Gordon Maskew Fair Award.
