= Athalie Richardson Irvine Clarke Prize =

- Clarke Prize Medallion
- Description: Recognizing excellence in water science and technology
- Country: United States
- Presented by: National Water Research Institute (NWRI)
- Rewards: Medallion and $50,000
- Website: www.nwri-usa.org/clarke-prize

The Athalie Richardson Irvine Clarke Prize, or “Clarke Prize”, is awarded annually by the National Water Research Institute (NWRI) of Fountain Valley, California. It consists of a medallion and $50,000 award for demonstrated excellence in the fields of water science and technology. It recognizes the highest contributions by an individual engaged in the discovery, development, improvement, or understanding of the issues associated with water quality, quantity, technology, or public policy.

== Nominations and selection ==
The Clarke Prize was established by NWRI in 1993 in honor of the late Athalie Richardson Irvine Clarke, co-founder of NWRI. The Prize was established in collaboration with Joan Irvine Smith, co-founder of NWRI and the daughter of Mrs. Clarke.

Clarke Prize Laureates are active researchers and/or practitioners who demonstrate excellence through their continuous contributions to the body of knowledge related to protecting, maintaining, treating, and reclaiming water resources. The Clarke Prize is one of only a dozen water prizes awarded worldwide and has been distinguished by the International Congress of Distinguished Awards as one of the most prestigious awards in the world.

Nominations for the Clarke Prize, as well as related credentials and letters of recommendation, must be received by April 1 of each year. The Clarke Prize recipient is selected by the Clarke Prize Executive Committee.

== Lecture and award ceremony ==
The Clarke Prize is awarded annually at the Clarke Prize Lecture and Award Ceremony. The black tie dinner includes a presentation of the medallion and the award of the $50,000 prize by members of the Joan Irvine Smith and Athalie R. Clarke Foundation. As part of the award ceremony, the recipient presents the annual Clarke Prize Lecture, which gives the recipient an opportunity to promote his or her area of expertise and to educate the audience on its importance and impact in the field of water research and technology.

== List of Clarke Prize laureates ==
Date	Recipient
2024	Amy Childress, PhD, Professor at University of Southern California.
2023	Charles Driscoll, PhD, Professor at Syracuse University.
2022	Eric M.V. Hoek, PhD, professor at University of California Los Angeles.
2021	Shane Snyder, PhD, Professor at Nanyang Technological University, Singapore.
2020	Karl Linden, PhD, Professor at the University of Colorado in Boulder.
2019	Paul Westerhoff, PhD, professor at Arizona State University.
2018	Janet Hering PhD, Director of the Swiss Federal Institute of Aquatic Science and Technology and Professor at École Polytechnique Fédérale de Lausanne and ETH Zurich
2017	Charles N. Haas Ph.D. BCEEM, LD Betz Professor of Environmental Engineering at Drexel University; Lecture:A Biologist to Engineers, and an Engineer to Biologists
2016	Mark Sobsey Ph.D., Professor of Environmental Sciences and Engineering at the University of North Carolina, Chapel Hill; Lecture:Innovations to Achieve Microbiologically Safe and Sustainable Water by Treatment Processes and Detection Methods
2015	John C. Crittenden Ph.D., P.E., N.A.E, C.A.E., Georgia Institute of Technology; Lecture: Water for Everything and the Transformative Technologies to Improve Water Sustainability
2014	David L. Sedlak, Ph.D., Civil and Environmental Engineering Professor at the University of California, Berkeley; Lecture: Delivering the Fourth Water Revolution
2013	R. Rhodes Trussell, Ph.D., P.E., BCEE, NAE, civil and environmental engineer Chairman and Chief Executive Officer of Trussell Technologies, Inc., based in Pasadena, California. Lecture: How Safe is Safe in the Treatment of Drinking Water for the Public
2012	Pedro J.J. Alvarez, Ph.D., P.E., DEE, environmental engineer George R. Brown Professor of Engineering at Rice University. Lecture: Convergence of Nanotechnology and Microbiology: Emerging Opportunities for Water Disinfection, Microbial Control, and Integrated Urban Water Management
2011	Mark R. Wiesner, Ph.D., P.E., environmental engineer James L. Meriam Professor of Civil and Environmental Engineering at Duke University. Lecture: Nanomaterials, Water, and the Directed Self-Assembly of Environmentally Responsible Industries
2010	Jerald L. Schnoor, Ph.D., civil and environmental engineer Allen S. Henry Chair of Engineering at the University of Iowa. Lecture: Water Sustainability in a Changing World
2009	Bruce E. Logan, Ph.D., environmental biotechnologist Kappe Professor of Environmental Engineering at Pennsylvania State University. Lecture: Energy Sustainability of the Water Infrastructure
2008	Nancy N. Rabalais, Ph.D., aquatic scientist Executive Director and Professor of the Louisiana Universities Marine Consortium in Chauvin, Louisiana. Lecture: Ecosystem Science Informs Sound Policy ... or Does It?
2007	James L Barnard, Ph.D., P.E., environmental engineer Global Practice and Technology Leader for Advanced Biological Treatment at Black & Veatch Corporation in Kansas City, Missouri. Lecture: Elimination of Eutrophication through Resource Recovery
2006	Philip C. Singer, Ph.D., P.E., water quality engineer Professor of Environmental Engineering at the University of North Carolina at Chapel Hill. Lecture: Disinfection Byproducts in Drinking water: Additional Science and Policy Considerations in the Pursuit of Public Health Protection
2005	Menachem Elimelech, Ph.D., water quality engineer Roberto C. Goizueta Professor of Chemical and Environmental Engineering at Yale University. Lecture: The Global Challenge for Adequate and Safe Water
2004	Vernon L. Snoeyink, Ph.D., environmental engineer Director of the Science and Technology Center for Advanced Materials for the Purification of Water with Systems (Water CAMPWS) at the University of Illinois at Urbana-Champaign. Lecture: Public Water Supply: Quantity, Quality, and Distribution Challenges
2003	George Tchobanoglous, Ph.D., wastewater engineer Professor Emeritus in the Department of Civil and Environmental Engineering at University of California, Davis. Lecture: The Importance of Decentralized Wastewater Management in the Twenty-first Century
2002	Harry F. Ridgway, Ph.D., microbiologist President of AquaMem Consultants in Las Cruces, New Mexico. Lecture: Membrane Research: The Quest for Pure Water in a New Millennium
2001	Joan B. Rose, Ph.D., microbiologist Homer Nowlin Endowed Chair for Water Research at Michigan State University. Lecture: The Unseen Challenge to Safe Water: Microbiology of Water.
2000	Charles R. O'Melia, Ph.D., water quality engineer Abel Wolman Professor of Environmental Engineering at Johns Hopkins University. Lecture: a long the river run
1999	James J. Morgan, Ph.D., aquatic chemist Marvin L. Goldberger Professor of Environmental Engineering at the California Institute of Technology (Caltech). Lecture: Health of the Waters and Water for Health
1998	Rafael L. Bras, Sc.D., hydrologist Bacardi and Stockholm Water Foundations Professor and Chair of the Massachusetts Institute of Technology (MIT). Lecture: What Is a Hydrologist?
1997	Perry McCarty, Sc.D., environmental engineer Silas H. Palmer Professor of Civil and Environmental Engineering Emeritus at Stanford University. Lecture: Learning and Listening About Water
1996	Walter J. Weber Jr., Ph.D., DEE, environmental engineer Gordon M. Fair and Earnest Boyce Distinguished University Professor at the University of Michigan at Ann Arbor. Lecture: Fit Water for the Future: The Requisite Exercise of Social Discipline, Competent Technology, Responsible Engineering, and the MEAD AORTA Agenda
1995	David C. White, M.D., Ph.D. (d. 2006) microbiologist Distinguished Professor in the Department of Microbiology, University of Tennessee-Knoxville. Lecture: Clean Water Hardly Anywhere and That Not Safe to Drink
1994	Bruce Rittmann, Ph.D., water quality engineer Director, Center for Environmental Biotechnology, Biodesign Institute at Arizona State University; Lecture: When Water Science Meets Water Technology

== National Water Research Institute ==
The National Water Research Institute (NWRI), a 501c3 nonprofit, was founded by a group of Southern California water agencies in collaboration with the Joan Irvine Smith and Athalie R. Clarke Foundation. Since 1991, NWRI has served as an independent industry expert in water science, technology, and public policy. NWRI's many leading-edge projects and activities have advanced the worldwide understanding in areas such as treatment technologies, potable reuse, salinity and nutrient management, and other factors that influence the quality and availability of water supplies and resources.

Major activities include:

- Funding and guiding scientific research projects.
- Supporting graduate fellowships and other water-related educational programs.
- Developing outreach material, such as reports and videos.
- Holding events like workshops and conferences to promote new issues and technologies.
- Providing peer-review panel services for local and state water agencies.
- Managing projects or programs for water agencies and others.

== Athalie Richardson Irvine Clarke ==
"Nothing is more important than the careful stewardship and development of our water resources", said Athalie Richardson Irvine Clarke, co-founder of NWRI.

Clarke (1903 - 1993) married James Irvine, Jr., in 1929, and along with her daughter, Joan Irvine Smith, ran the Irvine Ranch, one of California's most diverse and productive farms. Both Clarke and her daughter encouraged The Irvine Company to adopt a master plan for what would become the city of Irvine. She also encouraged The Irvine Company and the University of California system to establish the University of California, Irvine, on a portion of the vast Irvine Ranch. She and her daughter also founded the Irvine Museum, which is dedicated to California Impressionism. Clarke knew several of the "plein-air" painters of her generation personally, and the museum's exhibits reflect the California landscape she cherished.

Clarke recognized the vital importance of water and strongly promoted better water science and technology. In 1991, Clarke co-founded NWRI along with her daughter Joan Irvine Smith. In honor of Clarke's vision, NWRI established the Clarke Prize in 1993 to recognize outstanding individuals who have implemented better water science research and technology.

== Joan Irvine Smith ==
Born as Athalie Anita Irvine on May 29, 1933, the great-granddaughter of James Irvine (an immigrant who assembled about 120,000 acres (490 km^{2}) of what is now Orange County to form the Irvine Ranch), Joan Irvine Smith was well known for her philanthropy.

Smith's reverence for California's native plants and animals inspired her to become a leading environmental activist, speaking out about the urgent need to protect the state's precious natural resources and to balance environmental preservation with economic growth. She was also responsible for donating land to what became the University of California, Irvine.

As a leading philanthropist through the Joan Irvine Smith and Athalie R. Clarke Foundation, Smith continued to champion the University of California, Irvine, funding important medical causes, including the Reeve-Irvine Research Center. She also supports NWRI, which was founded by her vision and financial support, as well as numerous other environmental, cultural, and historical endeavors. She died on 19 December 2019.

== See also ==
- List of environmental awards
