= Mrs. International =

Mrs. International may refer to:

- "Mrs. International" (song), by Method Man & Redman, 2009
- Mrs. International, a beauty pageant

== See also ==
- Ms. International, a female bodybuilding contest
- Ms. International (pageant), part of the Ms. America Pageant Inc. system
