= Sharon Walker =

American environmental engineer

Sharon L. Walker is an American environmental engineer whose research concerns the movement of bacteria and nanoparticles through liquid and porous media, and applications to food safety and water quality. She is dean of the Drexel University College of Engineering, a distinguished professor in the Drexel Department of Civil, Architectural and Environmental Engineering, and executive director of the ELATES leadership training program for women in STEM fields.

== Education and career ==
Walker earned a double bachelor's degree in environmental studies and environmental engineering at the University of Southern California in 1998. She went to Yale University for graduate study, and after a 2000 master's degree in chemical engineering she completed a Ph.D. in environmental engineering in 2004. Her dissertation, Mechanisms of Bacterial Adhesion to Solid Surfaces in Aquatic Systems, was supervised by Menachem Elimelech.

She joined the University of California, Riverside as John Babbage Assistant Professor of Environmental Engineering in 2005, where she was promoted to associate professor in 2010 and full professor in 2014. At UC Riverside she was named interim dean of engineering in 2016. In 2018 she moved to her present position at Drexel University as dean of engineering and distinguished professor in the Department of Civil, Architectural and Environmental Engineering, with courtesy appointments in the Department of Chemical and Biological Engineering and the Department of Biodiversity, Earth and Environmental Science. She was the first woman to be dean of engineering at Drexel. She became executive director of the Drexel program in Executive Leadership for Academics in Technology, Engineering and Sciences (ELATES) in 2021.

== Recognition ==
Walker was named as a Fellow of the Association of Environmental Engineering and Science Professors in 2017. She was recognized as a 2019 Fellow of the American Association for the Advancement of Science. She was named to the College of Fellows of the American Institute for Medical and Biological Engineering in 2022, "for contributions in particle fate and transport in water treatment and food safety applications, and engineering education leadership".

In 2021, the National Organization for the Professional Advancement of Black Chemists and Chemical Engineers gave Walker their Winifred Burks-Houck Professional Leadership Award. In 2023, the USC Viterbi School of Engineering gave her their Mark A. Stevens Distinguished Alumni Award.
