= Tustin Branch =

Railway line in California

The Tustin Branch is a Union Pacific Railroad line in Orange County, California. It is the remnant of a longer line which connected Tustin to the Southern Pacific system in the 1880s.

The Southern Pacific Railroad (SP) built south to Anaheim in 1874, and was soliciting subsidies from localities, including Tustin, to be the terminus of further extension. Santa Ana offered the railroad incentives in cash and land and was selected as the end of their extension into Orange County. James Irvine refused to allow the company to lay tracks across his ranch, ceasing progress further south. After the Atchison, Topeka and Santa Fe Railway opened to Tustin in 1887, the SP responded by constructing its own new line to Tustin. Over one weekend the following year, Southern Pacific had workers covertly extended the tracks from Tustin to the edge of the Irvine Ranch property, though were stopped from proceeding further after being met with armed resistance from ranch hands. A court-ordered injunction the following Monday halted Southern Pacific's attempts to reach San Diego from the north. (The Santa Fe would go on to establish a rail route through Irvine with the blessing of the Irvine family.)

Fruit shipments made up the primary traffic on the line. Passenger service along the branch ceased in 1923. As the area developed, fruit orchards gave way to houses and reduced demand for freight rail. Segments of the abandoned line were converted to recreational use as a rail trail. Union Pacific Railroad maintains the remaining line as the Tustin Industrial Lead.
