= Charles Driscoll =

American environmental scientist

Charles Thurston Driscoll Jr. is a University Professor of Environmental Systems and distinguished Professor of Civil & Environmental Engineering in the College of Engineering and Computer Science at Syracuse University. He is known for his work on environmental chemistry, biogeochemistry, environmental engineering, aquatic chemistry, and water quality modeling.

== Education ==
Driscoll earned his bachelor's degree in Civil Engineering at University of Maine in 1974. He earned his MS and PhD at Cornell University. His 1980 PhD thesis was titled "Chemical characterization of some dilute acidified lakes and streams in the Adirondack region of New York State".

== Career ==
Driscoll began his career as professor in 1980 in the L.C. Smith College of Engineering and Computer Science at Syracuse University.

== Awards ==
Driscoll was elected member of the National Academy of Engineering in 2007 for "For leadership in understanding the ecological impact of acid rain and mercury depositions".

In 2017, he was elected member of the American Association for the Advancement of Science for "his seminal contributions on the effect of acid rain and mercury deposition on aquatic and terrestrial communities, and for service to the international scientific community".

In 2023, Driscoll was awarded the Athalie Richardson Irvine Clarke Prize in water science by the National Water Research Institute.
