= Charles N. Haas =

American environmental engineer

- Education: Illinois Institute of Technology; University of Illinois Urbana–Champaign
- Known for: Quantitative microbial risk assessment
- Awards: Clarke Prize (2017); A. P. Black Research Award (2018)
- Scientific career
- Fields: Environmental engineering
- Workplaces: Drexel University

Charles N. Haas is an American environmental engineering professor whose work focuses on quantitative microbial risk assessment (QMRA) and its application to drinking water quality, wastewater reuse, and public health protection. He is a professor of civil, architectural, and environmental engineering at Drexel University and was elected to the United States National Academy of Engineering in 2021 for contributions to quantitative microbial risk assessment for drinking water quality and public health.

== Education and career ==
Haas earned undergraduate and graduate degrees in biology and environmental engineering at the Illinois Institute of Technology, followed by a doctorate in environmental engineering from the University of Illinois Urbana–Champaign.

After completing his doctorate in 1977, he held a faculty position at Rensselaer Polytechnic Institute before returning to the Illinois Institute of Technology. He later joined Drexel University, where he has served as a faculty member in environmental engineering.

== Research ==
Haas's research addresses the assessment and management of health risks associated with exposure to pathogenic microorganisms in water and wastewater systems. According to a biographical profile published in Risk Analysis, he played a central role in the development of quantitative microbial risk assessment, particularly in applying probabilistic dose–response modeling to drinking water regulation and public health decision-making.

His work contributed to a shift away from reliance on indicator organisms alone toward risk-based approaches for managing viral and protozoan pathogens in drinking water, influencing regulatory frameworks in the United States and internationally. His research has also been applied to wastewater reuse, inhalation exposure to waterborne pathogens, and microbial risks relevant to biodefense and emergency response.

== Policy and advisory roles ==
Haas has contributed to public policy through expert testimony and advisory service. He has testified before state regulatory bodies and the United States House of Representatives on issues related to water quality and microbial contamination. He has also served on committees of the National Academies addressing drinking water safety, decontamination of buildings following biological incidents, and biological research oversight.

From 2005 to 2013, Haas co-directed the Center for Advancing Microbial Risk Assessment, a multi-university research consortium supported by the U.S. Environmental Protection Agency and the Department of Homeland Security, which focused on developing and applying QMRA methods to pathogens of public health and security concern.

== Honors and awards ==
Haas received the Athalie Richardson Irvine Clarke Prize from the National Water Research Institute in 2017 for contributions to water science and technology.

In 2018, he received the A. P. Black Research Award from the American Water Works Association for research contributions to water science and engineering.

In 2021, Haas was elected to the United States National Academy of Engineering.

== Selected works ==
Haas has authored and co-authored publications on microbial dose–response modeling, drinking water risk assessment, and quantitative methods in environmental engineering. His work includes contributions to the development of QMRA frameworks used in water quality regulation and risk management.
