= Bruce E. Logan =

American engineer

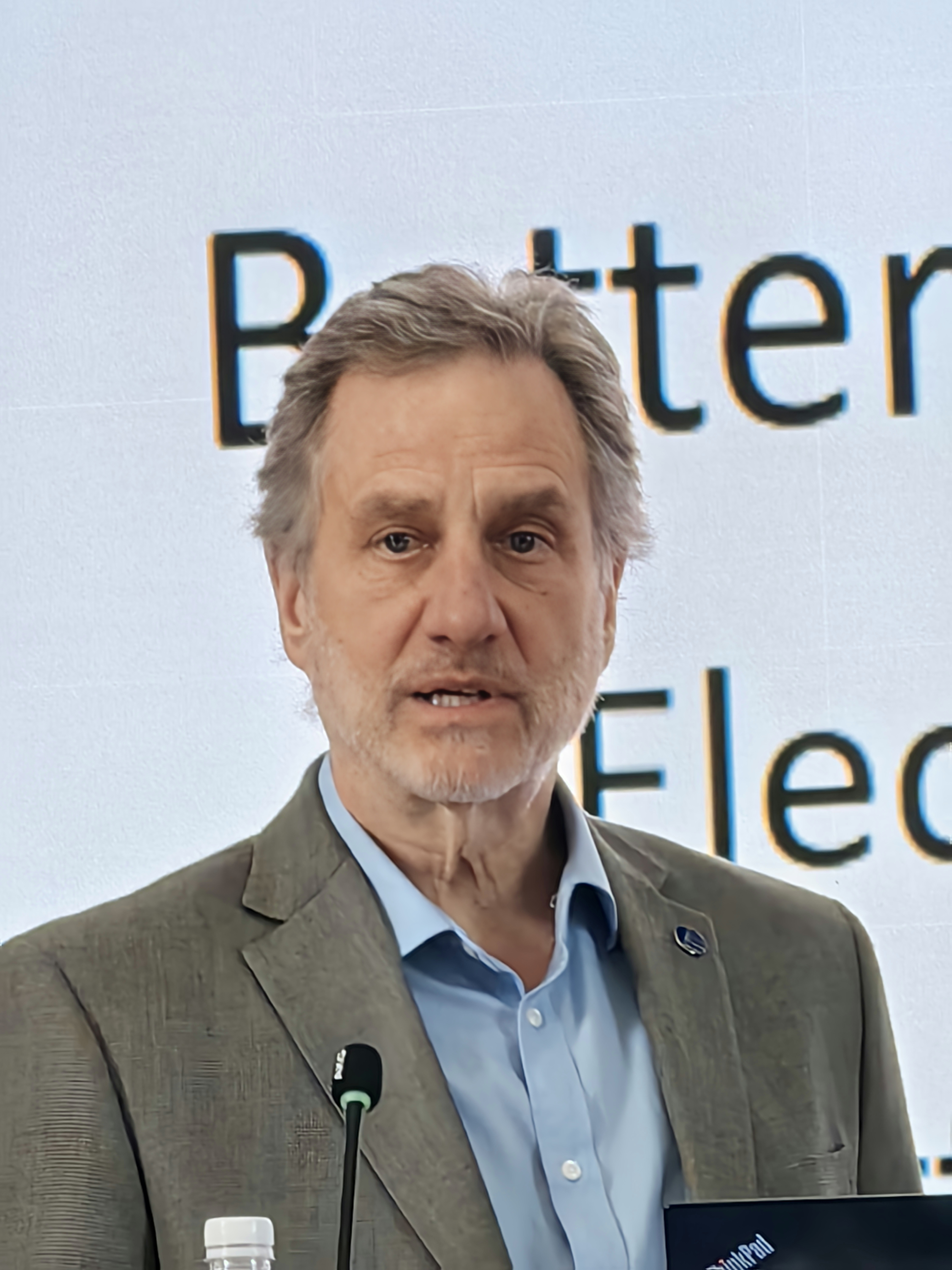
- Education: Rensselaer Polytechnic Institute; University of California Berkeley
- Known for: Wastewater engineering Microbial fuel cells
- Awards: 2009 Athalie Richardson Irvine Clarke Prize; Member of the National Academy of Engineering (since 2013)
- Scientific career
- Fields: Civil engineering Environmental engineering
- Institutions: Pennsylvania State University
- Thesis: Mass transfer models for microorganisms in aggregates and biofilms (1986)

Bruce Ernest Logan is an American civil and environmental engineer who serves as the Kappe Professor of Environmental Engineering and the Evan Pugh University Professor in Engineering at Pennsylvania State University (Penn State). He is also the director of the Institute of Energy and the Environment at Penn State. His main research interest is in the development of water infrastructure technology, and his lab has developed devices that can produce electricity from wastewater. He is also known for his work developing microbial fuel cells. Since 2013, he has been the editor-in-chief of Environmental Science & Technology Letters, and a fellow of the American Association for the Advancement of Science. He is also an elected member of the National Academy of Engineering (2013) for microbial electrochemical technologies for wastewater treatment and sustainable energy generation.
