= Joan Irvine Smith =

American philanthropist (1933–2019)

- Smith in 1937
- Born: Athalie Anita Irvine; 1 July 1933
- Died: 19 December 2019 (aged 86)
- Spouses: Charles Swinden (m.1952); Russell S. Penniman III (m. 1956-1958); Richard Dean Burt (m. 1959); Morton Whister "Cappy" Smith (m. 1963-1979)
- Children: 3
- Relatives: Thurmond Clarke (step-father)
- Family: Irvine

Joan Irvine Smith (1 July 1933 – 19 December 2019), was an American philanthropist, arts patron, horse trainer, and heiress to the Irvine family fortune from their California ranch who served on the Board of Directors of the Irvine Company and was instrumental in the formation of the city of Irvine, California.

== Early life and education ==
Born as Athalie Anita Irvine, she was the only child of James Harvey Irvine, Jr. and Athalie Richardson. She chose the name "Joan" at 4 years old. Her father died when she was 2 years old, and her grandfather, James Irvine II, died in 1947 and she inherited a minority share of the Irvine Company. After her uncle Myford "Mike" Irvine died in 1959 from what coroners deemed three self-inflected gunshot wounds, Joan became the family's main voice on the Board of Directors for The Irvine Company. She donated 10,000 acres to the state of California for what would become University of California Irvine. She lived in Beverly Hills with her mother and her second husband after she remarried in 1938. Her mother married again in 1944 to Judge Thurmond Clarke.

She studied at Westridge School, a private girls school in Pasadena, later dropping out from Marymount College and also attended UC Berkeley for one year.

== Personal life ==
In 1952 she married lifeguard Charles Swinden in Rancho San Joaquin, with the ceremony being officiated by her stepfather, Judge Thurmond Clarke. They had a son together, James Irvine Swinden, born in 1953. After their divorce she married three more times.

She married her second husband, Russell Sylvanus Penniman III, Naval captain and son of a prominent California family Their honeymoon was a year-long flight with stops in South America. Irvine and Penniman were married in 1956, had a child named Russell S. Penniman IV in 1957 who became a lieutenant and aircraft carrier pilot for the US Navy, then divorced in 1958. She cited her husband Penniman being lazy and unemployed, spending all day in bed as the reason she sought a divorce, when their son was only five months old. He went missing in 1991 after swimming near his home on the volcanic Carribean island of St. Vincent.

Joan married contractor Richard Dean Burt on February 28th, 1959, later divorcing him. She was married for a fourth time to a horse breeder, national equestrian champion, and socially prominent Virginian named Morton Whister "Cappy" Smith in 1963. He was 15 years her senior. With Morton, she had a son named Morton Irvine Smith. Joan and Morton were married for 16 years, living on their large Middleburg, Virginia horse farm "The Oaks" until their 1979 divorce. She also had a large horse farm in San Juan Capistrano called "The Oaks."

Joan Irvine Smith died on 19 December 2019.

== Irvine Company ==
Irvine Smith had a complicated relationship with the Irvine Company and the Irvine Foundation, becoming the major shareholder but suing for more shares for herself and three cousins.

In July 1962 she also sued the Irvine Company for $1,200,000 for alleged losses in a real estate transaction where a 146-acre parcel in Orange County was exchanged for agricultural land in Imperial County. She held a press conference to announce the filing of this suit at the Mark Hopkins Hotel in San Francisco.

She pushed for using Irvine Co. lands for urban development.

== University of California, Irvine ==
Joan Irvine Smith played an important role in the creation of the University of California, Irvine (UCI), both in site selection and the donation of 1,000 acres of land from Irvine Co. According to UCI's Chancellor Howard Gillman "without Joan Irvine Smith there likely would not be a University of California, Irvine". Along with the President of the University of California, Dr Clark Kerr, she talked about the progress and the project in industrial conferences, talking about the effort as "directed imagination".

She also helped establish the Reeve-Irvine Research Center at UC Irvine, a spinal cord injury research center named for actor Christopher Reeve, who was paralyzed after a riding accident.

== Philanthropy ==
Joan Irvine Smith contributed to different institutions and causes, such as donating to the building fund of her former school, Westridge, with the new building named the "Joan Irvine Library-Study Hall". Together with her mother she founded the "Joan Irvine Smith and Athalie R. Clarke Foundation" which, for example, gifted $1 million to UC Irvine's School of Law library. One of the main focus of this foundation was conservation, with the establishment of the National Water Research Institute and its yearly Athalie Richardson Irvine Clarke Prize award for leaders in the water sector.

== Patronage of the arts and the Irvine Museum ==
Along with her mother and son, James Irvine Swinden, she created the Irvine Museum in 1992, hiring Jean Stern as its first executive director. In 2016 the museum collection of 1,200 California Impressionist paintings were gifted to UC Irvine, for the establishment of a university museum.

== Horse breeding ==
Joan Irvine Smith learned to ride from a young age and became a recognized breeder, owning three ranches all called The Oaks, in Virginia, San Juan Capistrano, and Valley Center. She bred Holsteiner jumper horses, aiming to create an American sport horse to compete with European ones. When her stallion, called South Pacific, died of a rare disease caused by parasite Halicephalobus deletrix, Irvine Smith claimed it had been purposely infected and hired a private investigator.

== Honors and recognition ==
- Mary Lowther Ranney Distinguished Alumna Award, Westridge School (2001).
