= Linsky =

Linsky is a surname. Notable people with the surname include:

- David Linsky (born 1957), American lawyer and politician
- Freddie Linsky
- Jeff Linsky (born 1952), American jazz guitarist
- Leonard Linsky (1922–2012), American philosopher
- Ronald B. Linsky (1934–2005), American oceanographer
