= Takashi Asano =

20th and 21st-century Japanese engineer

- Takashi Asano in 2019
- Born: February 7, 1937 (age 89); Sapporo, Japan
- Known for: Environmental engineer specializing in water reclamation and reuse
- Spouse: Holly Newcomb Asano (Deceased 2017)
- Awards: The Order of the Sacred Treasure, Gold and Silver Star, Japan, Spring 2009 Stockholm Water Prize, Stockholm, Sweden, 2001 European Academy of Sciences and Arts, Vienna, Austria, 2001

Academic background
- Education: BS Hokkaido University, Sapporo, Japan MSE University of California, Berkeley PhD University of Michigan, Ann Arbor

Academic work
- Institutions: University of California, Davis

Takashi Asano (浅野 孝, Asano Takashi; born 1937) is a Japanese-born environmental engineer and a professor emeritus at the University of California, Davis. Asano has more than 40 years of academic and professional experience in environmental and water resources engineering, specializing in water reclamation, recycling, and reuse. During 1978–1992, he served as the water reclamation specialist for the California State Water Resources Control Board (SWRCB) in Sacramento, during the formative years of water reclamation, recycling, and reuse. Asano has conducted water reclamation and reuse studies at the SWRCB and the University of California, Davis, many of which contributed to the scientific and technical basis for State of California's Title 22 regulations (State of California Water Recycling Criteria). Previously, Asano taught at Montana State University, Bozeman, 1971–75, and Washington State University, Pullman, 1975–78. He has continued to lecture widely and publish on topics current and ancient.

Asano co-authored with Franklin L. Burton, Harold L. Leverenz, Ryujiro Tsuchihashi, and George Tchobanoglous the widely used textbook entitled Water Reuse: Issues, Technologies, and Applications by the McGraw-Hill Companies, Inc., New York, NY.

== Awards and honors ==
For his research on quantitative microbial risk analysis and groundwater recharge, Asano was awarded the 1999 Jack Edward McKee Medal by the Water Environment Federation (WEF), which was shared by Hiroaki Tanaka (Kyoto University, Japan) as well as Asano's colleagues, Edward D. Schroeder and George Tchobanoglous at the University of California, Davis.

Asano was awarded the Stockholm Water Prize in August 2001. That same year, Asano was elected a member of the European Academy of Sciences and Arts. In 2004, Asano was awarded an Honorary Doctorate Degree from his alma mater, Hokkaido University in Sapporo, Japan. The Government of Japan honored him with the Order of the Sacred Treasure, Gold and Silver Star, in Spring 2009. In addition, in 2008, he was awarded the Doctor Honoris Causa distinction by the University of Cádiz, Spain for his contributions in water reuse studies in the Mediterranean region.
