= James Irvine Foundation =

Philanthropic nonprofit to benefit the people of California

- Formation: Tax-exempt since November 1939; 86 years ago
- Type: 501(c)(3)
- Tax ID no.: EIN: 941236937
- Headquarters: San Francisco
- Region served: California
- Net Assets: 3,167,854,058 USD (2023)
- Revenue: 219,761,840 USD (2023)
- Expenses: 224,641,319 USD (2023)
- Website: irvine.org

The James Irvine Foundation is a philanthropic nonprofit organization that provides grants to other organizations in California.

The foundation was created in 1937 by James Harvey Irvine Sr. (1867–1947), as a charitable organization to hold controlling stock in the Irvine Company, because his intended successor, James Harvey Irvine Jr. (1894–1935) died of tuberculosis in 1935. Since 1937 the foundation has provided more than $2.8 billion in grants to nonprofit organizations throughout California. With about $3.3 billion in assets, the foundation made grants of $158.7 million in 2024.

The foundation is based in San Francisco, with an office in Los Angeles. The current president and CEO of the James Irvine Foundation is Don Howard.

== Grantmaking ==
The Foundation's focus is a California where all low-income workers have the power to advance economically. Grantmaking focuses on initiatives, instead of separate program areas, with specific outcome goals, timeline, and budgets.

Irvine's grantmaking also includes the annual the James Irvine Foundation Leadership Awards to honor innovative Californians working to solve some of the state’s biggest challenges.

== History ==
James Irvine's father was an Irish immigrant who arrived in San Francisco in 1849 during the California Gold Rush and established himself as a successful businessman. Later, he branched out geographically and acquired some 110,000 acres (450 km^{2}) of land in what is now Orange County. Upon his father's death, James Irvine inherited the land, which at the time was used as a stock ranch, and turned it into one of the largest, most productive agricultural enterprises in the state.

In response to the Great Depression, James Irvine decided to establish a foundation in 1937 that would promote the "general well-being of the citizens and residents of the state of California." The foundation became the primary stockholder of the Irvine Company, which owned the Irvine Ranch. With the rapid growth of Southern California during the 1940s and 50s, The Irvine Company was under pressure to develop its property. But in contrast to the unplanned sprawl nearby, the company worked to ensure that development was well planned and included a range of uses on its property such as higher education and agriculture.

Eventually, in the 1970s, the Irvine Foundation was forced to sell its shares in the company and diversify its holdings. When James Irvine died in 1947, his gift to the foundation was valued at $5.6 million. By 2024, these assets had grown to about 3.3 billion.
