= Joan Rose =

American microbiologist

Joan Bray Rose (born March 5, 1954) is an American microbiologist.

Rose earned her bachelor's degree in microbiology from the University of Arizona, followed by a master's degree in the same subject from the University of Wyoming. She returned to Arizona to obtain a doctorate, also in microbiology. Rose then taught at the University of South Florida until 2003. She serves as the Homer Nowlin Chair in Water Research at Michigan State University.

Rose won the Athalie Richardson Irvine Clarke Prize in 2001, and used some of the prize money to endow the Rose Water Fellowship at Michigan State University. She was the 2008 recipient of the International Water Association's Hei-jin Woo Award. Rose was elected a member of the United States National Academy of Engineering in 2011 "for contributions to improving water quality safety and public health." In 2015, the government of Singapore granted Rose honorary citizenship to honor her research on the nation's water infrastructure and quality. The next year, Rose was awarded the Stockholm Water Prize.
