= Susan Jeske =

American singer (born 1961)

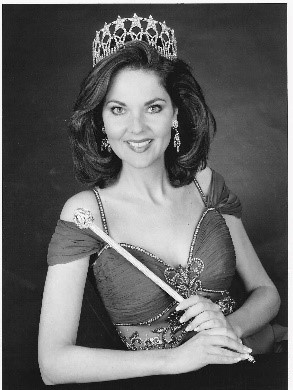
- Jeske in 1997
- Born: November 28, 1961 (age 64); Littleton, Colorado
- Education: Esthetician license in the state of California (#Z 00095318)
- Alma mater: University of the State of New York
- Occupations: Pageant director Pageant titleholder
- Years active: 1983–present
- Organization: Ms. America Pageant Corporation
- Known for: Ms. America 1997
- Height: 5 ft 9.5 in (1.77 m)
- Title: Ms. America 1997; Miss USA 1988 All Nations
- Spouse: James Irvine (2018-present)
- Website: Official website

Susan Jeske (born November 28, 1961) is the current CEO of Ms. America Pageant. In 1997 she was the first winner of Ms. America, a lesser known beauty peagant, which she purchased afterwards, holding a remodeled version of it since 2002. She has been involved in pageantry since 1983 as a competitor, judge, and pageant director at over 200 local, state, national and international pageant competitions. In 2007, Jeske was honored with the Lifetime Presidential Award from the President of the United States, George W. Bush for her lifetime contributions to charity and volunteerism. Other titles of her Ms. America Pageant company include Ms. International, Teen Ms. America, Ms. America Beauty Teen and Ms. America Fitness Pageants.

== Career ==
=== Pageantry ===
Jeske has held multiple pageant titles national and internationally. She was crowned Miss California American Beauty in 1985 and traveled to Europe with USO tour. In 1997 at the Luxor Las Vegas Hotel, she represented Colorado and was crowned Ms. America winning $75,000 in cash and prizes. She has also won the title of Miss USA 1988 All Nations.

In 1999, Jeske purchased Ms. America pageant from Houston-based company, Ms. America Inter-Nationale Inc. and received federal trademark from United States Patent and Trademark Office in 2000. She resuscitated the pageant in 2002 and founded Ms. America Pageant Corporation. Currently, Ms. America Pageant Corporation consists of four pageant titles Ms. America, Ms. International, Ms. America International and Miss Pacific US. The mission of these pageants is to empower women across nation and worldwide. In 2002, Jeske directed the first Ms. America International pageant. From 2002 to 2006, the titleholders of Ms. America International were qualified to compete in other international pageant system including Miss Earth, Miss Asia Pacific International and Miss Globe International.

=== Professional singing career and Guinness World Record ===
A professional singer, Jeske has performed at more than 1,500 events. Her audiences have included 7 United States Presidents, including President Bill Clinton and the Presidential Inauguration of George W. Bush. Foreign dignitary audiences include Prime Minister Margaret Thatcher and the Queen of Thailand's 60th birthday celebration. Jeske also performed at the opening of the Ronald Reagan Presidential Library and the STS-102 Space Shuttle Discovery launch of March 2001. On July 4, 1992, Jeske established a world record which is published in the Guinness World Records. She sang the Star-Spangled Banner live at 17 official events, attended by approximately 60,000 people in California within a 24-hour period from July 3 to the 4th. She traveled a total of 373 miles to the functions via automobile, helicopter, and boat. Her accomplishment is recognized in the 1993 Guinness Book of Records. While establishing her record, Jeske raised over $90,000. She donated the full amount to a crippled children hospital near Bangkok, Thailand. As a result of her donation, she traveled to 42 scheduled appearances within a two-week period and was featured in over 50 newspapers, 5 national television shows, and the cover of 3 magazines. She also received private audiences with the Governor of Bangkok, Prime Minister of Thailand, and the Royal Family. Jeske's record in the Guinness World Record book still stands.

=== TV and public appearances ===
Jeske has been the guest in several news broadcast shows and appeared in several shows such as Live with Regis and Kathie Lee, Good Morning America, The Montel Williams Show and To Tell The Truth. She has also been featured in soap opera daytime dramas such as Days of Our Lives, The Young and the Restless, as well as The Bold and the Beautiful. She has also been the spokeswoman for Fortune 500 companies such as Hyundai, Casio, Procter & Gamble, Panasonic, and Xerox. She has made over 2,000 presentations at trade shows and conventions throughout the United States. Currently, Jeske is an advocate of safe cosmetics.

In 1992, Jeske invited by the Thai Arts and Cultural Committee to Bangkok during 60th birthday celebration of Queen consort of Thailand Sirikit. She headed the delegation of 12 national and international beauty queens during her visit. The delegation raised $92,000 for a children's hospital. Jeske also served as presidential envoy for the presidents Bill Clinton and Ronald Reagan.

=== Other professions ===
Jeske has performed as an image and protocol consultant for television, radio and magazines, and gives image advice to corporate executives, politicians and debutant. She has also served as a professional speaker and instructor and has taught hundreds of women the art of advanced Glamour makeup techniques. She has also earned the title of “The Queen Maker” for being one of the most sought after pageant coaches in the world. She has directly assisted many contestants who have gone on to win state, national, and international beauty titles.

== Education ==
Jeske graduated in 1999 from Regents College of the University of the State of New York (now Excelsior University) with a bachelor's degree.

== Awards ==
During her reign as Ms. America, Jeske created the “Students Against Violence” assembly program where she received 15 keys to the city and more than 30 proclamations and commendations. For these actions, Jeske received the President's Call to Service Award from President George W. Bush. The President's Call to Service Award is awarded by the President of the United States to people who have completed more than 4,000 hours of community service. It is the highest level of the President's Volunteer Service Award.

Jeske's platform includes challenging students to face uncomfortable realities that result from guns in schools. She also brings awareness to Women's Issues.

== Personal life ==
In 2018, Jeske married James Irvine, heir to the Irvine family of California's fortune.
