= Ronald B. Linsky =

American marine biologist (1934–2005)

Ronald B. Linsky

Ronald Benjamin Linsky (June 16, 1934 – August 14, 2005) was an American marine biologist who served as Executive Director of the National Water Research Institute (NWRI) for 15 years, where he was responsible for overseeing an institute dedicated to supporting cooperative research to create new sources of water and to protect freshwater and marine environments. Under his leadership, NWRI grew into the third largest water research institute in the United States.

== Background ==
Linsky was born during the Great Depression on June 16, 1934, in Los Angeles, California, to Walter and Helen Linsky. He attended the University of Southern California (USC) beginning in 1952, but put his education on hold when he volunteered to join the army. After 21 months as a private in the Army Security Agency, he was discharged for medical reasons after coming down with appendicitis, but completed his 8-year service through the army reserve. He returned to USC and continued studying biology, earning both his B.S. and M.S. degrees at the same time in 1962.

== Early career ==
Floating Marine Laboratory, Fury II (late 1960s early 1970s) from postcard (Photographer William Weir)

Immediately following his university education as a science teacher, Linsky began working at Westminster High School in Westminster, California. During the summer of 1963, he offered to teach marine biology as a summer school class. The course was so successful that, over the subsequent 5 years, Linsky went from biology teacher to Chairman of the Science Department at Westminster and Fountain Valley High Schools, as well as President of the District Education Association in the Huntington Beach Union High School District. He also became a research assistant at the University of California, Irvine, working in Back Bay Newport, and served on the Accrediting Commission for Western Association of Schools and Colleges.

In 1967, he was offered a job as the Coordinator of Marine Sciences for the Orange County Department of Education in Santa Ana, California. There, he developed the Floating Laboratory Program, a federally funded project that drew thousands of people to learn hands-on marine science. Twenty school districts took part in the program in its first year of operation, and in 3 years, 32,000 students and their teachers had gone to sea with the Floating Lab. The program later expanded to include extended classes for college students, such as a weekend study session on Catalina Island and short cruises through the Channel Islands.

Linsky began lecturing at various local libraries and colleges to inform people about topics such as marine mammals or ocean pollution. In 1969, he appeared at a 2-day State Marine Science Convention in Florida to encourage funding for water research. In the same year, he spent 1 month in Mexico City as a lecturer and consultant at the invitation of the Mexican Government to help develop marine science programs within the Mexican educational system. As part of that effort, he was the first North American educator to be invited to the Congresso Nacional de Oceanografica, where he conducted a 2-day workshop in oceanography for 1,200 selected educators, technicians, and scientists throughout Mexico.

Though Linsky was becoming more and more recognized as an expert oceanographer, he had no formal training in the field. Despite this fact, he held marine science workshops at the University of California system and served as an advisor to the Fullerton College Oceanographic Technology Program. He was also appointed Vice President of Educational Affairs for both the American Society for Oceanography and the National Oceanography Association. Eventually, Linsky even worked with famous oceanographer Jacques Cousteau after being hired by Doubleday Multi-Media, Inc. to edit, re-script, develop, and market educational resource materials for The Undersea World of J.Y. Cousteau film series.

== The Sea Grant Program at the University of Southern California ==
In 1970, several universities approached Linsky to recruit him to lead their ocean research programs. Linsky chose to work with his alma mater, USC, and began his career overseeing the brand-new Sea Grant Program. The program goals were to: train and educate the next generation of marine scientists and engineers; support research in marine resources management and development; and provide advisory services to the business and science communities, as well as the general public.

During his Directorship, Linsky visited 15 countries in a 3-year period to conduct research, organize international conferences, or present at leading oceanographic institutions throughout the world.

== International Work with the Sea Grant Program ==
=== North America ===
Linsky was responsible for organizing bilingual international conferences and training programs in Mexico, including exploring the environmental impacts of opening the Trans-Peninsula Highway in Baja California.

=== South Pacific ===
Linsky traveled across French Polynesia, stopping in Tonga, Fiji, Samoa, New Zealand, and Australia to lecture and investigate marine resources development programs.

=== Asia ===
He toured Thailand and India as a lecturer and consultant in marine and coastal resources planning and development.

=== Europe ===
As a member of the National Academy of Engineering’s Committee on Ocean Research, he worked with Great Britain, France, and Germany to encourage information exchange and to expand knowledge in the field of integrated coastal zone management. A year later, he traveled through Great Britain, Scotland, Ireland, Norway, and the Netherlands on an NOAA-sponsored research grant to study the impacts of North Sea oil exploration and development upon the coasts.

== Directorship in Hawaii ==
In 1975, Linsky decided to direct the Sea Grant Program at the University of Hawaii at Manoa (UH). The Sea Grant programs at USC and UH were different in that USC was dealing with the management of existing resources while Hawaii, made up of eight main islands rich in resources, needed to better plan its marine future.

Linsky directed much of the Sea Grant program's funding (UH had the largest in the nation) towards research for improving aquaculture and fisheries. Aquaculture became such an important component of Linsky's work that he became Special Assistant to the Dean of the College of Tropical Agriculture for aquaculture research and development in 1977.

One of his greatest accomplishments at the time was the creation of a statewide market for the aquaculture industry in Hawaii, representing more than 300 acres (1.2 km^{2}) and $5 million in investments.

== Independent career ==
In 1978, Linsky ended his service as Director of Sea Grant in Hawaii and moved back to California to work for himself. He was soon contracted by the United Nations (UN) to work in Southeast Asia. His first job with the UN involved planning and conducting a workshop on developing coastal and offshore resources in Southeast Asia and the South Pacific. A contact from the workshop sent him to Sri Lanka twice to serve as a consultant and UN rep in coastal resource development.

Linsky then moved to the Caribbean to become the UN's Chief Technical Advisor and, later, CEO of the Institute of Marine Affairs (IMA) in Trinidad and Tobago. He spent 2 years working hard to establish the IMA in a developing country with diminishing offshore resources. In the process, he built a laboratory, purchased an ocean research ship, and established programs revolving around the fishing industry, coastal zone management, education, and advisory services. He also introduced aquaculture as a viable resource.

== National Water Research Institute ==
In 1991, Linsky was selected to become the founding Executive Director of the National Water Research Institute (NWRI), a non-profit organization devoted to creating new sources of water through research and technology.

One of Linsky's earliest projects with NWRI included traveling to Oman to help establish the Middle East Desalination Research Center. The center was created to research desalination technology and share knowledge in the Middle East and North Africa, with the express purpose of encouraging these countries to work together on the same problem.

More recently, he was involved with introducing and encouraging the use of riverbank filtration, a predominately European drinking-water treatment process, within the United States. He had also planned to introduce this low-cost technology to developing nations by holding a conference in China in 2006.

Linsky was also internationally known and respected for his advocacy and belief in the value of water. He encouraged the concept of viewing water as an asset that provides services that are valued by the consumer. To Linsky, the value of water was not just the cost of treating and distributing it; it was in the ability to enjoy a day at the beach, drought-proof a region, or purchase a product, like a newspaper or pair of jeans, that could not be manufactured without water.

Altogether, NWRI had supported over 160 water-related projects under Linsky's directorship, focusing on the areas of exploratory research, treatment and monitoring, water quality assessment, and knowledge management.

Linsky died on August 14, 2005 at age 71 of myelodysplastic syndrome, a bone marrow ailment.

== Awards ==
- 2005: Southern California Water Committee, Inc. Lifetime of Achievement Award
- 1971: Premi Tridente d’Ora Ustica Oceanographic Institution, Italy
  - Awarded for outstanding contributions in the field of Oceanography.

== The NWRI Ronald B. Linsky Fellowship for Outstanding Water Research ==
One of Linsky's greatest passions was education. He believed that it is essential to support and encourage young people who are interested in water science. Whether that was through giving out awards at science fairs or in sending kids to Water Camp, Linsky ensured that NWRI took an active role in educational outreach programs. For instance, he loved to invite secondary school students to dinner to meet experts in the water industry at NWRI's Research Advisory Board meetings. Whenever a young person called asking for an internship or scholarship to help attend a water festival, he immediately made arrangements to help them out.

In 2006, NWRI established a fellowship in honor of Linsky's memory as part of NWRI's graduate fellowship program. Funding for this special fellowship was contributed by Patricia Linsky, Dr. David and May Hsu, Dr. Stephen Lyon, H.S. and Ponnamma Muralidhara and the Joan Irvine Smith/Athalie R. Clarke Foundation.
