= Ms. International (pageant) =

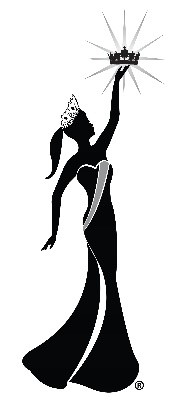
- Pageant logo
- Formation: 2010; 16 years ago
- Type: Beauty pageant
- Headquarters: Costa Mesa, California
- Location: United States
- Official language: English
- Founder: Susan Jeske
- Current titleholder: Jolyn Farber: New York
- Website: www.msinternationalpageant.com

Ms. International is part of the Ms. America Pageant Inc. system and is open to women 26 years of age and older who are single, divorced, widowed, or married. The beauty pageant was created to recognize women's accomplishments and encourage the use of their Crown for a Purpose to support and promote volunteer service.

== History ==
Susan Jeske, the founder of Ms. International Pageant, first used the title when she crowned Amanda Delgado, Ms. International 2010 as its first inaugural queen.

Deana Molle' was crowned Ms. International 2011–12 on 7 November 2011 at the Veterans of Foreign Wars Auditorium in Riverside, California.

Stacy Smith from Colorado, was crowned Ms. International 2013 on 23 June 2013 at the Hilton Orange County Hotel in Costa Mesa, California.

Riti Chikkerur from Texas was crowned Ms. International 2014–15 on 9 August 2014 at the Curtis Theater in Brea, California. She is the first Indian-American to win the title and own an oil company.

Deborah Valis-Flynn from South Carolina, was crowned Ms. International 2016 at the Curtis Theater in Brea, California on 29 August 2015.

Nova Kopp from Georgia was crowned Ms. International 2017 at the Curtis Theater in Brea, California on 3 September 2016. She was the first Ms. International to win $12,000.00 in cash and give it all away to charity. She is a domestic violence awareness advocate and is a survivor herself. Her volunteer service has included working with Meals on Wheels through the Ballina Community Centre in Ireland.

Jolyn Farber representing New York was crowned Ms. International 2018 at the Queen Mary in Long Beach, California on 10 March 2018. She was also the People's Choice Internet Voting winner and won $12,218.90.

== Ms. America Pageant Corporation ==
The Ms. America Pageant is a California corporation that currently owns and runs the Ms. International, Ms. America, Ms. America International, and Miss Pacific U.S. beauty contests. Based in Costa Mesa, California, the corporation is owned by Susan Jeske who is the CEO.

== Gallery of winners ==
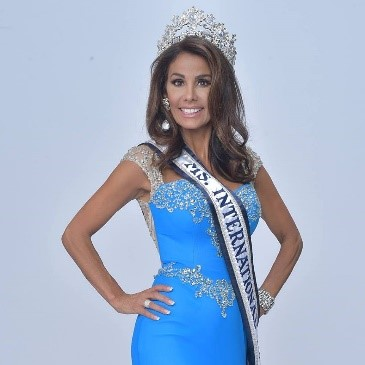
Ms. International 2017, Nova Kopp

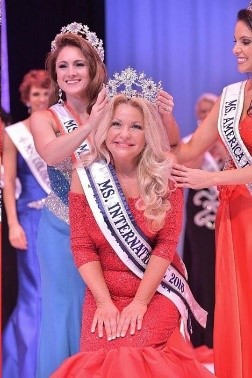
Ms. International 2016, Deborah Valis-Flynn

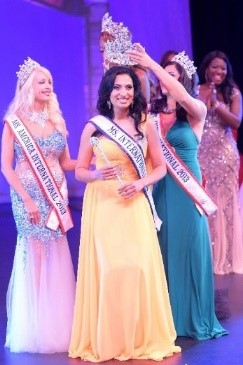
Ms. International 2014–15, Riti Chikkerur

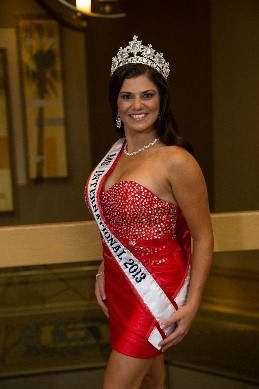
Ms. International 2013, Stacy Smith

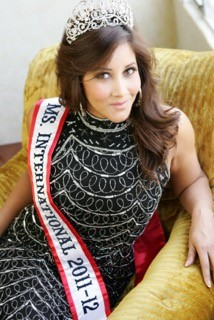
Ms. International 2011–12, Deana Molle'

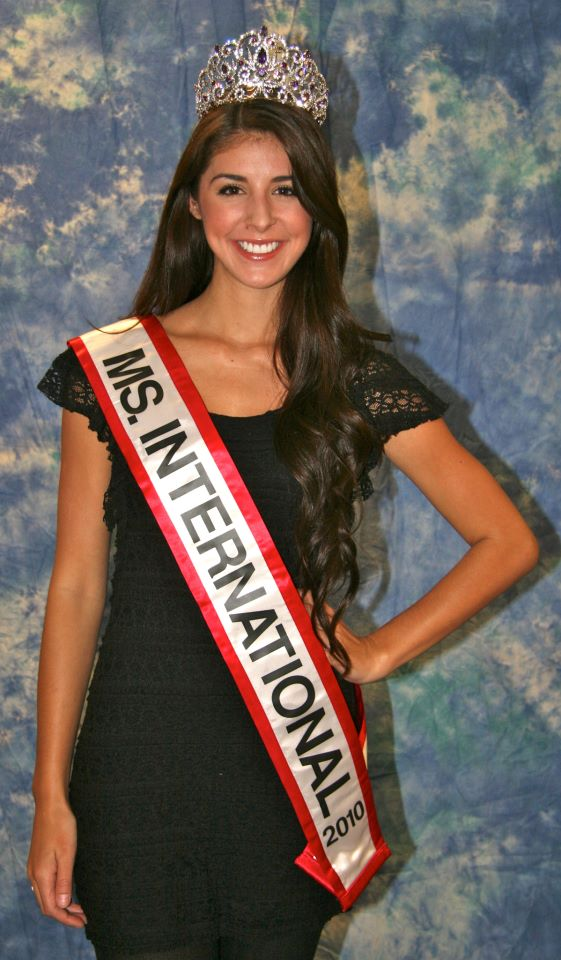
Ms. International 2010, Amanda Delgado

== Titleholders ==
Year	Winner	State	Notes
2018	Jolyn Farber	New York	Jolyn's platform is mental health. First Attorney to win the title.
2017	Nova Kopp	Georgia (U.S. state)	Mrs. Georgia United States 2016, Spokesperson for Extraordinary Peoples Awards
2016	Deborah Valis-Flynn	South Carolina	Mrs. Alabama International 1997
2014-15	Riti Chikkerur	Texas	First Indian American to win the title
2013	Stacy Smith	Colorado	-
2011-12	Deana Molle'	California	Former Ms. America 2004-05
2010	Amanda Delgado	California	Reina Mundial del Banano 2008; 2nd runner-up to Miss California USA 2014
