= Lynskey Performance Designs =

American bicycle manufacturer

- Type: LLC
- Industry: Bicycle design and manufacture
- Founded: 2006
- Founder: Lynskey family
- Headquarters: Chattanooga, Tennessee, USA
- Key people: Lynskey family

Lynskey Performance Designs LLC, is a titanium bicycle designer and manufacturing company based in Chattanooga, Tennessee, founded and currently operated by the Lynskey family, who began building titanium bicycles in 1984. The family founded the company Litespeed Titanium, Which they sold in 1999. They began Lynskey Performance Designs in January 2006. Lynskey designs bicycles for the specific needs of road, mountain, touring, commuting, and urban riding. All Lynskey bicycles utilize titanium, an expensive metal that offers enduring strength yet is very lightweight. Lynskey also designs a collection of stems, seatposts, and handlebars.

The Lynskey family has pioneered many designs and technologies used today in titanium bicycles and the cycling industry, including Helix tubing technology. Helix tubing consists of a twisted titanium tube to gain the benefits of both a round tube and a beam. A round tube resists twisting forces, and a beam resists bending. The Helix allows for a stiff bike while still retaining comfort with a distinctive shape. Customization of the bike for the customer is a key selling feature for the company.

In April 2026, the company filed for Chapter 11 bankruptcy protection, citing low cash finance and substantially high liabilities caused by declining sales and Shopify chargebacks.
