= Quantitative microbiological risk assessment =

Quantitative microbiological risk assessment (QMRA) is the process of estimating the risk from exposure to microorganisms.

The process involves measuring known microbial pathogens or indicators and running a Monte Carlo simulation to estimate the risk of transfer. If a dose-response model is available for the microbe, it be used to estimate the probability of infection.

QMRA has expanded to be used to estimate microbial risk in many fields, but is particularly important in assessments of food water supply and human faeces/wastewater safety.

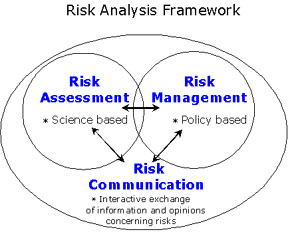
Risk assessment relative to the other activities of risk analysis1

== QMRA to assess safety of sanitation systems ==
The World Health Organisation's 2006 Guidelines for the Safe Use of Wastewater, Excreta and Greywater in Agriculture suggest that QMRA should be used to determine possible risk levels which can be achieved by sanitation systems.
