= Liney =

Liney is a surname. Notable people with the surname include:

- John Liney (1912–1982), American cartoonist
- Pat Liney (1936-2022), Scottish footballer

== See also ==
- Laney (surname)
- Lindy (name)
- Linney
