= Solution-friction model =

Reverse osmosis transport model

The solution-friction model (SF model) is a mechanistic transport model developed to describe the transport processes across porous membranes, such as reverse osmosis (RO) and nanofiltration (NF). Unlike traditional models, such as those based on Darcy's law, which primarily describes pressure-driven solvent (water) transport in simple porous mediums, the SF model also accounts for the coupled transport of both solvent (water) and solutes (salts).

== Overview ==
The solution-friction model is derived on a pore-flow or viscous flow mechanism, but extends its applicability by incorporating the force balances on the species transporting through the membrane. This inclusion allows for a detailed understanding of the interdependent fluxes of water and salt, influenced by interactions between salt ions and water molecules. The SF model has been able to successfully describe the transport of water and salt in RO membranes, showing good agreement with experiments. The development of the SF model also corrects the misconception that RO water transport is a diffusion-based process.

== Ion transport ==
Ion transport through the RO membrane is driven by the gradient of chemical potential within the membrane. The solution-friction model describes this transport by considering the frictions between ions, ions and water, and ions and membrane. The force balance for an ion is given by the equation:

$-\nabla \mu_i = RTf_{i-w} (v_i - v_w) + RTf_{i-m} v_i$

- $\mu_i$ is the chemical potential of ion, $i$
- $f_{i-w}$ and $f_{i-m}$ are the frictional coefficients between ions and water and between ions and the membrane, respectively
- $v_i$ and $v_w$ are the velocities of ions and water, respectively
- $R$ is the ideal gas constant
- $T$ is the absolute temperature

Note that the membrane is stationary and its velocity $v_m$ is therefore set to zero. By considering only the coordinate perpendicular to the membrane surface, the ion flux ($v_i$) governed by diffusion, electromigration, and advection can be expressed as:

$v_i = K_{w,i} v_w - K_{w,i} D_{i,m} \left( \frac{d \ln c_i}{dx} + z_i \frac{d\varphi}{dx} \right)$

- $D_{i,m}$ is the diffusion coefficient of ion inside the membrane, which is the inverse of $f_{i-w}$
- $K_{w,i}$ characterizes the contribution of ion-water friction to the total friction ($\frac{f_{i-w}}{f_{i-w}+f_{i-m}}$)
- $c_i$ is the ion concentration
- $z_i$ is the ion valence
- $\varphi$ is the electrical potential

== Water transport ==
Water transport is governed by the gradient of total pressure, counterbalanced by water-membrane and ion-water frictions. The balance is expressed as:

$-\nabla P^{\text{tot}} = RTf_{w-m} v_w + RT \sum_i f_{i-w} c_i (v_w - v_i)$

- $P^{\text{tot}}$is the total pressure acting on a volume element of water, which is equal to the hydrostatic pressure minus the osmotic pressure $(P-\Pi)$
- $K_{w,i}$ characterizes the contribution of ion-water friction to the total friction ($\frac{f_{i-w}}{f_{i-w}+f_{i-m}}$)
- $c_i$ is the ion concentration
- $z_i$ is the ion valence
- $\varphi$ is the electrical potential
- $v_i$ and $v_w$ are the velocities of ions and water, respectively

Substituting the expression of ion velocity into water velocity, we arrive at the following expression for the force balance on water:

$-\frac{1}{RT} \frac{dP^{\text{tot}}}{dx} = f_{w-m} v_w + \sum f_{i-w} c_i (1 - K_{w,i}) + \sum K_{w,i} \frac{dc_i}{dx} + \sum K_{w,i} c_i z_i \frac{d\varphi}{dx}$

When ion-membrane friction is negligible (i.e.,$K_{w,i} = 1$), this equation can be written as

$-\frac{1}{RT} \frac{dP^{\text{tot}}}{dx} = f_{w-m} v_w + \sum \frac{dc_i}{dx} + \sum c_i z_i \frac{d\varphi}{dx}$

The equation indicates that the water permeance is influenced by the electrical potential gradient inside the membrane, which has been verified by salt permeation through highly charged Nafion membranes. Due to the interactions between ions and water, increasing salt concentration decreases the water permeance. Nevertheless, a simplification can be made when a membrane has a low volumetric charge density (i.e., within the membrane), like in typical RO membranes. Therefore, the electrical potential gradient can be neglected as it is relatively small compared to the concentration gradient. The equation for water flux can be eventually simplified as:

$v_w = \frac{1}{RT f_{w-m} L_m} \Delta P - \frac{1 - \Phi}{RT f_{w-m} L_m} \Delta \Pi$

- $L_m$is the membrane thickness
- $\Phi$ is the salt partitioning coefficient

Defining $\frac{1}{RT f_{w-m} L_m} = A$ and $1 - \Phi = \sigma$, the water permeability velocity is obtained as:

$v_w = A (\Delta P - \sigma \Delta \Pi)$

This equation is identical in form to the Spiegler-Kedem-Katchalsky equation, a classic model in irreversible thermodynamics for water transport through semipermeable membranes. This ensures that the SF model aligns with basic thermodynamic principles.
