= Michael Lynskey =

New Zealand psychiatrist

- Born: Michael Thomas Lynskey
- Education: University of Otago; University of Canterbury
- Known for: Cannabis use disorder Developmental psychopathology
- Scientific career
- Fields: Addiction medicine Psychiatry
- Workplaces: King's College London; Washington University in St. Louis

Michael Thomas Lynskey is a New Zealand academic and psychiatrist. He is Professor of Addictions in the National Addictions Centre at the Institute of Psychiatry, Psychology and Neuroscience of King's College London in the United Kingdom. He has previously held positions at the National Drug and Alcohol Research Centre of the University of New South Wales in Australia and at the Department of Psychiatry at the Washington University School of Medicine in the United States. He trained in New Zealand, where he graduated with a master's degree from the University of Canterbury. He also attended the University of Otago and worked on the Christchurch Health and Development study.
