= Nathalie Tufenkji =

Canadian chemical engineer

Academic background
- Education: Science, 1995, Champlain College Saint-Lambert; BSc, Chemical Engineering, 1999, McGill University; MSc, PhD, 2005, Yale University
- Thesis: Spatial distributions of retained colloidal and microbial particles in porous media: measurements, modeling and mechanisms (2005)

Academic work
- Institutions: McGill University

Nathalie Tufenkji is a Canadian chemical engineer. She is a Tier 1 Canada Research Chair in Biocolloids and Surfaces and a professor of Chemical Engineering at McGill University. In 2022, Tufenkji was recognized by the Ordre des ingénieurs du Québec with their Honoris Genius award in the Research or Teaching category.

== Early life and education ==
Tufenkji graduated from Champlain College Saint-Lambert in 1995 where she specialized in science. Following CEGEP, she enrolled at McGill University for her Bachelor of Science degree in chemical engineering and completed her Master of Science and PhD at Yale University. In her first year at Yale, Tufenkji was awarded a Graduate Fellowship by the Natural Sciences and Engineering Research Council of Canada (NSERC). Upon graduating from Yale in 2005, Tufenkji became one of two women to earn Yale's Becton Prize for best PhD in engineering and applied sciences. She also received the American Water Works Association Academic Achievement Award for best PhD dissertation.

== Career ==
Upon completing her PhD, Tufenkji returned to McGill University as an assistant professor in 2005. In this role, she worked to develop new approaches to detecting pathogens in water. In 2006, she began an examination of how nanotechnology is dispersed in the environment, particularly with respect to contaminating water supplies. This then developed into examining the behaviour of microbial pathogens that leach into groundwater from sources like manure, wildlife excrement, leaching landfills, and leaking septic tanks. As a result of her academic research, Tufenkji was appointed the associate director of McGill's Brace Centre for Water Resources Management and a Canada Research Chair in Biocolloids and Surfaces. In these new roles, she received an NSERC grant for her project "Toxicity, transformations and transport of engineered nanoparticles in soils: New approaches to detect and characterize environmental risks." Her efforts were later recognized with the Women of Distinction Award by the YWCA Montreal. Tufenkji's research was lauded explicitly for "positioning Canada at the forefront of research that combines public health and environmental protection.”

Through her tenure at McGill, Tufenkji continued her research in the areas of green nanotechnology, biosensing and bioadhesion, antimicrobial materials in nature, and water quality protection. As such, Tufenkji joined an international team of scientists working to develop a guideline for the Organisation for Economic Co-operation and Development for the testing of nanomaterial leaching into soils. As a result of her research, she received McGill's Principal's Prize for Emerging Researchers. She was also elected a Member of the Royal Society of Canada's College of New Scholars, Artists and Scientists. In 2017, Tufenkji was promoted to a Tier 1 Canada Research Chair in Biocolloids and Surfaces.

Tufenkji focus on contamination led her to discover that maple syrup, combined with antibiotics, could be used to kill up to 90% of bacteria. She also found that the syrup disabled the bacteria's ability to adjust the permeability of their membrane, allowing more antibiotics to enter and reducing the bacteria's capacity to expel them. In May 2020, Tufenkji received the Killam Research Fellowship from the Canada Council for the Arts to support her research on addressing the global crisis of plastic pollution in soils and freshwater. The following month, she was named the winner of the Award for the Support of Women in the Engineering Profession by Engineers Canada. Tufenkji was also elected a Fellow of the Canadian Academy of Engineering for her "exceptional contributions towards sustainable development of nanotechnology, solving problems linked with plastic pollution, and the control of harmful bacteria." In 2022, Tufenkji was recognized by the Ordre des ingénieurs du Québec with their Honoris Genius award in the Research or Teaching category. The following year, she was named a Fellow of the Royal Society of Canada.
