= American Academy of Environmental Engineers and Scientists =

U.S. professional organization

- Abbreviation: AAEES
- Formation: 1955; 71 years ago
- Merger of: American Academy of Environmental Engineers and Environmental Engineering Intersociety Board
- Type: Professional association
- Tax ID no.: 22-1687990
- Legal status: 501(c)(6)
- Headquarters: Annapolis, Maryland
- President: Jeff Greenfield, Ph.D., P.E., BCEE, BCES
- Executive Director: vacant
- Website: www.aaees.org
- Formerly called: American Sanitary Engineering Intersociety Board Environmental Engineering Intersociety Board American Academy of Environmental Engineers

The American Academy of Environmental Engineers and Scientists (AAEES) is a society of professional engineers and scientists who have demonstrated special expertise in environmental engineering or science beyond that normally required for professional practice. The principal purpose of the academy is serving the public by improving the practice, elevating the standards, and advancing public recognition of environmental engineering and science through a program of specialty certification, similar to that used in healthcare and other professions.

== History ==
The academy began in 1952, when a group of sanitary engineers working in the public health and defense communities expressed concern about the requirements for professional practice. This led to the creation of the Committee for the Advancement of Sanitary Engineering of the American Society of Civil Engineers (ASCE). Later, the Joint Committee for the Advancement of Sanitary Engineering was formed, composed of representatives from the ASCE, the American Public Health Association, the American Society for Engineering Education, the American Water Works Association and the Water Pollution Control Federation. With the sponsorship and support of these five organizations, the American Sanitary Engineering Intersociety Board was incorporated under the laws of the State of Delaware on October 21, 1955. Certified sanitary engineers were identified as Diplomates (now also known as Board Certified Environmental Engineers) of the American Academy of Sanitary Engineers, and were listed on a roster with the names of each member and their specialties as recognized by the Board. Other organizations joining as sponsors included the American Institute of Chemical Engineers in 1957 and the Air Pollution Control Association in 1962.

In 1966 the name of the Board was changed to the "Environmental Engineering Intersociety Board" (EEIB) and the name of the roster from the "American Academy of Sanitary Engineers" to the "American Academy of Environmental Engineers" (AAEE).

A year later, in 1967, the Board of Trustees changed the American Academy of Environmental Engineers from just a roster of certified engineers to an organization with its own rights, bylaws and officers. This new organization was charged with working cooperatively with the EEIB in the advancement of all aspects of environmental engineering. The American Public Works Association joined as a sponsor of these organizations in 1969.

The AAEE and the EEIB were merged into one organization in 1973. In 1976 the National Society of Professional Engineers became a sponsor of the academy and it was followed by the Association of Environmental Engineering and Science Professors in 1977, the American Society of Mechanical Engineers in 1981 and the Solid Waste Association of North America in 1988.

In 2011, the academy decided to award board certifications to environmental scientists, which led to the adoption of its current name on 1 January 2013.

== Certification ==
In addition to education and experience, Board-Certified Environmental Engineers and Scientists must have passed written and oral examinations and reviews by an admission panel of the academy. The academy's certification program is accredited by the Council of Engineering and Scientific Specialty Boards.

The AAEES is the publisher of the Environmental Engineering Body of Knowledge (EEBOK), which defines the knowledge, skills, and abilities expected of practicing environmental engineers. The first edition was published in 2009 under the leadership of Debra Reinhart and has been used as a reference for environmental engineering curriculum mapping at accredited programs. The second edition (EEBOK2) was published in 2025, prepared by an eight-member Task Committee. The executive summary of EEBOK2 incorporates a redefinition of the profession, that environmental engineers use engineering disciplines in developing solutions to problems of planetary health, and references the Environmental Engineering 3.0 framework, the care penalty in environmental engineering, and the expansion of ethical practice to elevate planetary health alongside the traditional obligation to hold paramount the safety, health, and welfare of the public.

Requirements for board certification include a baccalaureate or higher degree in engineering or science from an accredited university, not less than eight years of professional engineering or scientific experience, and an examination on the practice of environmental engineering or science in a particular area of specialization. Exams are offered on the following topics for engineers: Air Pollution Control, Environmental Sustainability, General Environmental Engineering, Hazardous Waste Management, Industrial Hygiene, Radiation Protection, Solid Waste Management and Water Supply/Wastewater Management. Scientists may choose from tests covering Air Resources, Environmental Biology, Environmental Chemistry, Environmental Microbiology, Environmental Toxicology, Groundwater and the Subsurface Environment, Surface Water Resources, or Sustainability Science.

== Recognition ==
To recognize outstanding practice, the AAEES conducts an annual Excellence in Environmental Engineering and Science Awards Competition where Grand Prizes are awarded to projects submitted in one of nine categories, and a Superior Achievement Award is made to the project with the highest overall score in the annual competition. Additional annual competitions include the Environmental Communication Award Competition as well as the Student Video and Social Media Competition.

Individual awards by the AAEES include: AAEES Science Award, Excellence in Environmental Engineering and Science Education, Gordon Maskew Fair Award, Edward J. Cleary Award, Stanley E. Kappe Award, Honorary Member, and International Honorary Member. In collaboration with the Environmental Engineering and Science Foundation (EESF), the AAEES helps to select the recipients of: W. Wesley Eckenfelder Graduate Research Award, Frederick G. Pohland Medal, W. Brewster Snow Award, and Paul F. Boulos Excellence in Computational Hydraulics/Hydrology Award.
