= Irvine family of California =

American family of real estate developers

The Irvine family of Southern California is a prominent Californian family of real estate developers. Through the Irvine Company, the family played an important role in the development of Orange County. The city of Irvine and the University of California, Irvine, take their name from the family.

== James Irvine I ==
James Irvine (1827–1886) was born in County Down, United Kingdom of Great Britain and Ireland on December 27, 1827, the second to the youngest of nine children. When Ireland's potato crop failed in 1845, James Irvine and his younger brother William were among those who left for the United States. The family name is Scottish, meaning that James would have been an Ulster Scot, or Scots-Irish. Irvine worked for two years in New York City. In 1848 Irvine went to join the California Gold Rush as a merchant and miner. In 1854, he purchased an interest in a San Francisco commission house on Front Street, operated by a relative, John Lyons. The business was renamed "Irvine & Co., wholesale produce and grocery merchants". He began investing his profits in income-producing San Francisco real estate and soon became a wealthy man. Irvine also became a silent partner in the sheep-raising venture Flint, Bixby & Company of brothers Thomas and Benjamin Flint, and their cousin Llewellyn Bixby. The purchase of the 48,800-acre (197 km^{2}) Rancho San Joaquin in 1864 and the 47,200-acre (191 km^{2}) Rancho Lomas de Santiago in 1866 marked the beginning of their operations in Southern California. In 1867, Irvine married Henrietta Maria (Nettie) Rice, the daughter of prominent Cleveland, Ohio, educator, writer, poet, and Ohio State Senator Harvey Rice, who was a direct descendant of early Massachusetts Bay Colony settler Edmund Rice. Nettie died in 1874, and Irvine married Margaret Byrne in 1880. He died of Bright's disease on March 15, 1886, and is buried in Colma, California.

== James Irvine II ==
James Harvey Irvine Sr. (1867–1947), son of James Irvine I and Henrietta Maria (Nettie) Rice, was born October 16, 1867, in San Francisco. He was the grandson of Harvey Rice. James II's mother died when he was seven years old, and his father died when he was about eighteen. Between the time of James Irvine I's death in 1886 and James Irvine II's inheritance of the Southern California real estate holdings upon his twenty-fifth birthday in 1892, the properties were supervised by James Irvine I's brother, George Irvine. James II bought out Flint and the other partners, and formed the Irvine Company. He married Frances Anita Plum in 1892, and they had three children, James Harvey "Jase" Irvine Jr. (1894–1935), Katharine Helena Irvine (1894–1920) and Myford Plum Irvine (1898–1959). In 1931, James II married Mrs. Kathryn Brown White, who died in 1950. James II lived in San Francisco until the 1906 San Francisco earthquake, when he relocated to the Irvine Ranch. He was a member of the Bohemian Club, and kept a residence in San Francisco, at 2421 Pierce Street. He established the James Irvine Foundation in 1937, an entity dedicated to the "general well-being of the citizens and residents of the state of California." James II owned nearly a third of the land in present-day Orange County. The city of Irvine (formerly Myford) is named after him. He died of a heart attack on August 24, 1947, while on a fishing trip in Montana at the Flying D Ranch with Irvine Company manager William Bradford Hellis and real estate broker Walter S. Tubach.

== James Irvine Jr. ==
James "Jase" Harvey Irvine Jr. (1894–1935) was groomed since a young man to take over the Ranch and presidency of the Irvine Company, but he died at a young age. He married Madeline Agassiz in 1914, but they were divorced in 1928. He married Athalie Richardson Irvine Clarke (1903–1993) in 1929. Clarke. She later was a member of the Irvine Company Board of Trustees and with her daughter, pushed for a master plan for building Irvine, California. Clarke was as Republican delegate for multiple presidential conventions and encouraged Richard Nixon and Ronald Reagan's political careers. They they had one daughter, Athalie Anita "Joan" Irvine (1933–2019), When James Irvine III died of tuberculosis in 1935, James II set up The James Irvine Foundation, a charitable organization to hold controlling stock in the Irvine Company.

== Myford Irvine ==
When James II died in 1947, Myford "Mike" Plum Irvine (1898-1959), his only surviving male child, took over the presidency of the Irvine Company. He created the city of Irvine, California, the largest master-planned community on the planet. In 1950, he married Gloria Wood Irvine (1912-1971), who had previously been married to Irvine's stepbrother William Thornton White Jr. Myford and Gloria had a son together James Myford Irvine, who would go on in 2018 to marry Susan Jeske, the first Ms. America and CEO of the Ms. America pageants (not to be confused with the similarly-named Miss America and Miss USA pageants). Myford Irvine was found dead on the family ranch in 1959 of what coroners deemed three self-inflicted gunshot wounds. At the time of his death, he was involved in several land deals, including some in Las Vegas. His niece Joan and mother Athalie suspected that his death was actually a murder. The death resulted in a series of lawsuits from various members of the Irvine family.

== Joan Irvine Smith ==
FIn 1957 at the age of 24, Myford Smith's niece Joan Irvine Smith (1933-2019) (daughter of James Irvine III and Althea Irvine Clarke and stepdaughter of noted California judge Thurmond Clarke) took over her mother's spot on the Board. Following Myford's death in 1959, which she believed was a murder not a suicide, Joan became the family's main voice on the Board of Directors for The Irvine Company. She donated 10,000 acres to the state of California for what would become University of California Irvine.

== Morton Irvine Smith ==
Morton Irvine Smith (born 1963), the son of Joan Irvine Smith and Morton Whister Smith, achieved notoriety when he was the subject of a publicized family feud in 1994, when his mother, according to Morton, disinherited him for marrying his wife Marianne Campbell. Smith attended the University of Rhode Island where he met his wife to be, Marianne Campbell, who was a nurse in a children's cancer center. Campbell says she was not invited to the wedding. Smith participated in "the resurgence of right-wing extremism in Orange County" and served on the board of the American Phoenix Project, whose founder was linked to the deadly Jan. 6 United States Capitol attack. Smith's wife, Marianne Campbell Smith, was convicted of trespassing on 22 October 2021 after her arrest on 15 August 2020 for taking part in an anti-masking protest during the COVID-19 pandemic.

== Family tree ==
- James Irvine (1827-1886) married Henrietta Maria "Nettie" Rice Irvine (1841-1874), daughter of Ohio State Senator Harvey Rice, in 1866, later marrying Margaret Mullen Irvine in 1882.
  - James "J.I." Harvey Irvine II (1867-1947) married Frances Anita Plum (1862-1909) in 1892 and later married Katherine Brown Irvine (1886-1950) in 1931. Katherine later remarried to William Thornton White, and they had a son who was a stepbrother to her children, William Thornton White Jr.
    - James "Jase" Harvey Irvine Jr. (1894–1935) was married to Madeline Agassiz from 1914 to 1928 and later to Athalie Richardson Clarke (1903-1993), daughter of judge Thurmond Clarke, from 1929 until his death six years later.
      - Joan Irvine Smith (1933-2019) was married to Charles Swinden in 1952, Russell S. Penniman III from 1956 to 1958, Richard Dean Burt in 1959, and, finally, Morton Whister "Cappy" Smith from 1963 to 1979. She had one son each with Swinden, Penniman, and Smith.
        - James Irvine Swinden (born 1953) married Deborah Swinden and later, Madeline Martin Swinden
          - James "Jase" Irvine Swinden Jr.
        - Russell Sylvanus Penniman IV (born 1957) married Carol Gordon Penniman.
          - Elizabeth Irvine Huntley Penniman (born 1986)
          - Russell "Rex" Sylvanus Penniman V
        - Morton Irvine Smith (born 1963) married Marianne Campbell Smith in 1994.
          - Antoinette Athalie Smith
          - Charlotte Smith
          - Virginia Rose Smith
    - Kathryn Helena Irvine (1894–1920) married Frank Zachary Lillard (1889-1967). She died four days after giving birth to daughter Katie, of pneumonia from complications due to childbirth.
      - Kathryn “Katie” Anita Irvine Wheeler (1920-2003) married Charles Stetson Wheeler III (1913-1993), grandson of Charles Stetson Wheeler in 1941.
        - Nita Wheeler Connelly (1945-2017) married Robert O. Haefelfinger then John Patrick Connelly.
          - Brigitte Haefelfinger
          - Monika Haefelfinger
          - Kathryn Haefelfinger
          - Robert J. Haefelfinger
          - Christopher Connelly
          - Sasha Connelly
        - James "Jim" Irvine Wheeler (1947-1996), died of a heart attack.
        - Helene Irvine Wheeler Huyler (born 1951)
    - Myford "Mike" Plum Irvine (1898–1959) married Thelma Elsie Romey in 1922 and married Gloria Wood Irvine (1912-1971) in 1950. Gloria had a son, William Thornton White III, and a daughter, Gloria "Gay" White (who married Ernest Bryant, grandson of land heiress Susanna Bixby Bryant and great-grandson of John William Bixby), with her previous husband, Irvine's stepbrother William Thornton White Jr.
      - Linda Jane Irvine Gaede married Meryl Keith Gaede in 1959
        - Tracy Gaede
      - James Myford Irvine (born 1953) married Cyndee Irvine. He later married Susan Jeske (born 1961) in 2018.
        - Jeremy Irvine
        - Jory Irvine

== See also ==
- Clan Irvine
