= National Water Research Institute =

The National Water Research Institute (NWRI), a 501(c)(3) nonprofit organization based in Fountain Valley, California was founded in 1991. NWRI Collaborates with water utilities, regulators, and researchers in innovative ways to help develop new healthy, and sustainable sources of drinking water. NWRI was founded by the Joan Irvine Smith & Athalie R. Clarke Foundation in 1991.

NWRI assembles teams of scientific and technical experts who provide credible independent peer review of water projects. These teams develop recommendations that support investment in advanced water treatment infrastructure and public health, and that enable water resource management decisions grounded in science and best practices.

== Funding ==
NWRI's core funding comes from the peer review services it provides to government agencies and public utility clients. It also receives annual funding from member agencies, which are:

- Inland Empire Utilities Agency
- Irvine Ranch Water District
- Los Angeles Department of Water and Power
- Metropolitan Water District of Southern California
- Orange County Sanitation District
- Orange County Water District

Representatives from NWRI's member agencies serve on NWRI's Board of Directors.

== Activities ==
In addition to providing peer review panels for its clients, the Institute awards fellowships to support master's or doctoral candidates whose research is related to water science and technology, water resources management, and water policy and regulation.

NWRI awards the Athalie Richardson Irvine Clarke Prize, established in 1993, to thought leaders in water research, science, technology, or policy. The Prize consists of a medallion and US $50,000 award, which is presented at an award ceremony and lecture in Southern California.

== Personnel ==
Past directors of NWRI include Ronald B. Linsky from 1991 to 2005 and Jeffrey J. Mosher from 2005 to 2017. Kevin Hardy succeeded Jeff Mosher in 2017.

NWRI's founder, Joan Irvine Smith, was the great-granddaughter of James Irvine, an immigrant who acquired about 120,000 acres (490 km^{2}) of what is now Orange County, California, to form the Irvine Ranch.
