= Association of Environmental Engineering and Science Professors =

Professional association

- Predecessor: American Association of Professors of Sanitary Engineering (AAPSE); Association of Environmental Engineering Professors (AEEP)
- Formation: December 5, 1963; 62 years ago
- Founded at: Chicago, IL
- Headquarters: 1211 Connecticut Ave NW, Suite 650, Washington, DC 20036
- Products: Environmental Engineering Science (journal)
- President: Gregory W. Characklis
- President-elect: Peter J. Vikesland
- Vice President: Linda K. Weavers
- Website: www.aeesp.org

Association of Environmental Engineering and Science Professors (AEESP) is made up of professors in academic programs throughout the world who provide education in the sciences and technologies of environmental protection. The headquarters are located in Washington, DC.

== History ==
AEESP was founded in 1963 as the American Association of Professors of Sanitary Engineering (AAPSE) and later as the Association of Environmental Engineering Professors (AEEP).

== Membership ==
The more than 700 members of AEESP include faculty, students, and affiliates in the fields of environmental engineering and environmental engineering science.

== Mission ==
The Association assists its members in improving education and research programs, encourages undergraduate and graduate education, and serves the profession by providing information to government agencies and the public. Direct services provided to members include publication of the journal, Environmental Engineering Science, hosting biennial research and education conferences, coordinating recognition of excellence in research, teaching, and service, and providing a forum for the exchange of information relevant to the field including newsletters, online media, workshops, and lectures.

== Awards ==
Through the AEESP Foundation, recognition of members include: doctoral dissertation and MS thesis awards; educator and educational content awards; global engagement, research, and publication awards; and the Perry L. McCarty Founders Award. In collaboration with sister organizations, the AEESP recognizes outstanding students, outstanding teaching, and outstanding integration of research, teaching, and the practice of environmental engineering with the Pohland Medal.

== See also ==
- American Academy of Environmental Engineers and Scientists
- American Chemical Society
- American Institute of Chemical Engineers
- American Public Health Association
- American Public Works Association
- American Society for Engineering Education
- American Society for Microbiology
- American Society of Civil Engineers
- American Society of Mechanical Engineers
- American Water Works Association
- International Water Association
- National Society of Professional Engineers
- Water Environment Federation
