= Shearing (physics) =

Deformation due to shear stress

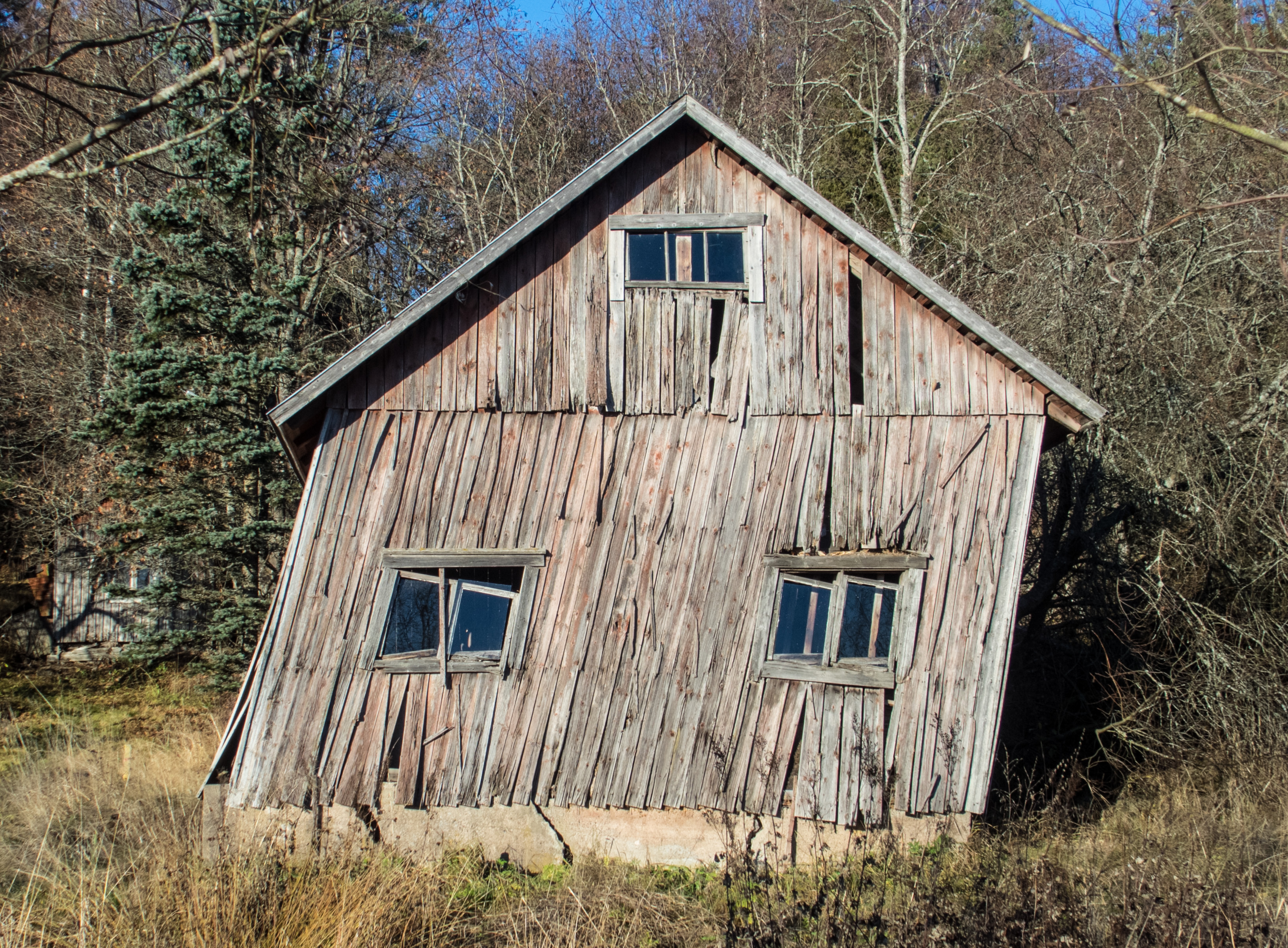
The rectangularly-framed section has deformed into a parallelogram (shear strain), but the triangular roof trusses have resisted the shear stress and remain undeformed

In continuum mechanics, shearing refers to the occurrence of a shear strain, which is a deformation of a material substance in which parallel internal surfaces slide past one another. It is induced by a shear stress in the material. Shear strain is distinguished from volumetric strain. The change in a material's volume in response to stress and change of angle is called the angle of shear.

== Overview ==
Often, the verb shearing refers more specifically to a mechanical process that causes a plastic shear strain in a material, rather than causing a merely elastic one. A plastic shear strain is a continuous (non-fracturing) deformation that is irreversible, such that the material does not recover its original shape. It occurs when the material is yielding. The process of shearing a material may induce a volumetric strain along with the shear strain. In soil mechanics, the volumetric strain associated with shearing is known as Reynolds' dilation if it increases the volume, or compaction if it decreases the volume.

The shear center (also known as the torsional axis) is an imaginary point on a section, where a shear force can be applied without inducing any torsion. In general, the shear center is not the centroid. For cross-sectional areas having one axis of symmetry, the shear center is located on the axis of symmetry. For those having two axes of symmetry, the shear center lies on the centroid of the cross-section.

In some materials such as metals, plastics, or granular materials like sand or soils, the shearing motion rapidly localizes into a narrow band, known as a shear band. In that case, all the sliding occurs within the band while the blocks of material on either side of the band simply slide past one another without internal deformation. A special case of shear localization occurs in brittle materials when they fracture along a narrow band. Then, all subsequent shearing occurs within the fracture. Plate tectonics, where the plates of the Earth's crust slide along fracture zones, is an example of this.

Shearing in soil mechanics is measured with a triaxial shear test or a direct shear test.

== See also ==
- Shear strength
