= Tilt test =

Tilt test may refer to:

- Tilt table test; in medicine the medical procedure often used to diagnose dysautonomia or syncope
- Bielschowsky's head tilt test
- Tilt test (geotechnical engineering); in geotechnical engineering, ground engineering, geotechnics
- Tilt test (vehicle safety test); in vehicle testing
