= Angle of repose =

Steepest angle at which granular materials can be piled before slumping

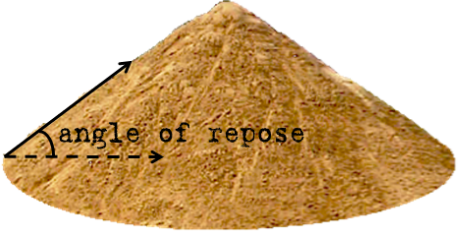
Angle of repose of a heap of sand

Sandpile from the Matemateca (IME-USP) collection

The angle of repose, or critical angle of repose, of a granular material is the steepest angle of descent or dip relative to the horizontal plane on which the material can be piled without slumping. At this angle, the material on the slope face is on the verge of sliding. The angle of repose can range from 0° to 90°. The morphology of the material affects the angle of repose; smooth, rounded sand grains cannot be piled as steeply as can rough, interlocking sands. The angle of repose can also be affected by additions of solvents. If a small amount of water is able to bridge the gaps between particles, electrostatic attraction of the water to mineral surfaces increases the angle of repose and related quantities such as the soil strength.

When bulk granular materials are poured onto a horizontal surface, a conical pile forms. The internal angle between the surface of the pile and the horizontal surface is known as the angle of repose and is related to the density, surface area and shapes of the particles, and the coefficient of friction of the material. Material with a low angle of repose forms flatter piles than material with a high angle of repose.

The term has a related usage in mechanics, where it refers to the maximum angle at which an object can rest on an inclined plane without sliding down. This angle is equal to the arctangent of the coefficient of static friction μ_{s} between the surfaces.

== Applications of theory ==
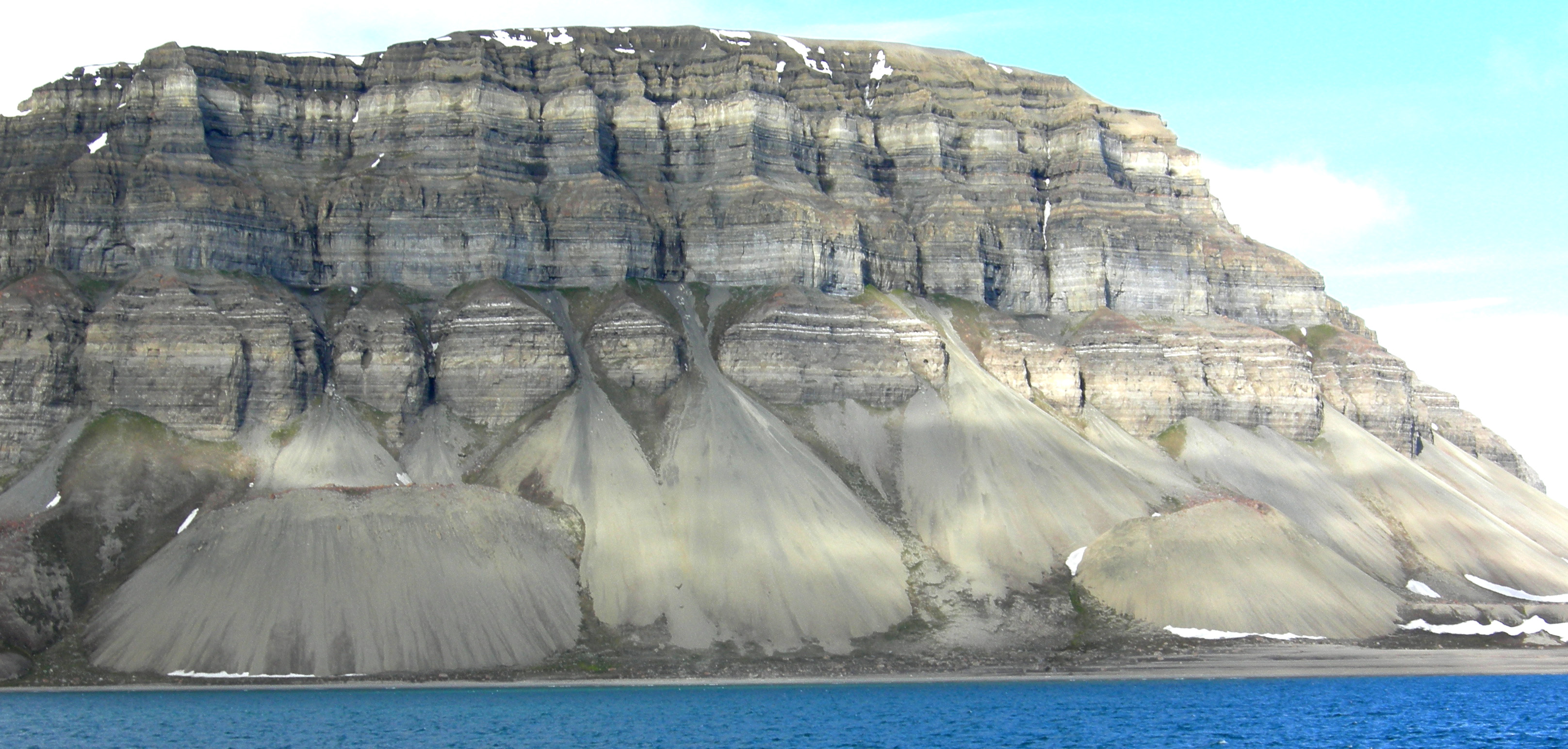
Talus cones on north shore of Isfjord, Svalbard, Norway, showing angle of repose for coarse sediment

The angle of repose is sometimes used in the design of equipment for the processing of particulate solids. For example, it may be used to design an appropriate hopper or silo to store the material, or to size a conveyor belt for transporting the material. It can also be used in determining whether or not a slope (of a stockpile, or uncompacted gravel bank, for example) would likely collapse; the talus slope is derived from angle of repose and represents the steepest slope a pile of granular material can take. This angle of repose is also crucial in correctly calculating stability in vessels.

Angle of repose is also commonly used by mountaineers as a factor in analysing avalanche danger in mountainous areas.

== Formulation ==
If the coefficient of static friction μ_{s} is known of a cohesionless material, the angle of repose can be calculated with the following function.

$$\tan{(\theta)} \approx \mu_\mathrm{s}\,$$

where $\theta$ is the angle of repose.

This free body diagram demonstrates the relationship between angle of repose and material on the slope.

A simple free body diagram can be used to understand the relationship between the angle of repose and the stability of the material on the slope. For the heaped material to resist collapse, the frictional forces must be equivalent to the horizontal component of the gravitational force $m g \sin\theta$, where $m$ is the mass of the material, $g$ is the gravitational acceleration and $\theta$ is the slope angle:

$$m g \sin\theta = f$$

The frictional force $f$ is equal to the product of the coefficient of static friction $\mu$ and the normal force $N = mg\cos\theta$:

$$m g \sin\theta = N \mu$$

$$m g \sin\theta = \mu m g \cos\theta$$

$$\left ( \frac{\sin \theta}{\cos\theta} \right ) = \mu$$

$$\theta_R = \arctan(\mu)$$

Where $\theta_R$ is the angle of repose, or the angle at which the slope fails under regular conditions, and $\mu$ is the coefficient of static friction of the material on the slope.

== Measurement ==
There are numerous methods for measuring angle of repose and each produces slightly different results. Results are also sensitive to the exact methodology of the experimenter. As a result, data from different labs are not always comparable. One method is the triaxial shear test; another is the direct shear test.

The measured angle of repose may vary with the method used, as described below.

=== Tilting box method ===
This method is appropriate for fine-grained, non-cohesive materials with individual particle size less than 10 mm. The material is placed within a box with a transparent side to observe the granular test material. It should initially be level and parallel to the base of the box. The box is slowly tilted until the material begins to slide in bulk, and the angle of the tilt is measured.

=== Fixed funnel method ===
The material is poured through a funnel to form a cone. The tip of the funnel should be held close to the growing cone and slowly raised as the pile grows, to minimize the impact of falling particles. Pouring of the material is stopped when the pile reaches a predetermined height, or the base a predetermined width. Rather than attempting to measure the angle of the resulting cone directly, the cone height is divided by half the width of its base; the angle of repose is the inverse tangent of this ratio.

=== Revolving cylinder method ===
The material is placed within a cylinder with at least one transparent end. The cylinder is rotated at a fixed speed, and the observer watches the material move within it. The effect is similar to watching clothes tumble over one another in a slowly rotating clothes dryer. The granular material assumes a certain angle as it flows within the rotating cylinder. This method is recommended for obtaining the dynamic angle of repose, which may vary from the static angle of repose measured by other methods.

== Of various materials ==
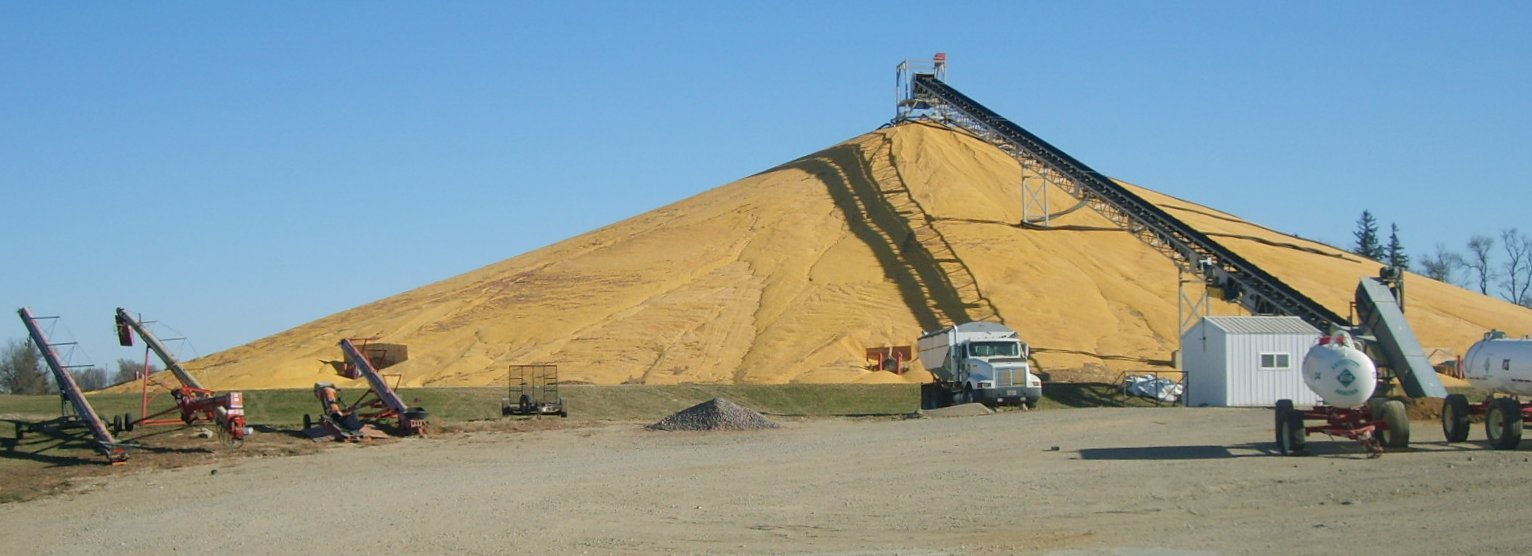
This pile of corn has a low angle of repose

Here is a list of various materials and their angle of repose. All measurements are approximated.

| Material (condition) | Angle of Repose (degrees) |
|---|---|
| Ashes | 40° |
| Asphalt (crushed) | 30–45° |
| Bark (wood refuse) | 45° |
| Bran | 30–45° |
| Chalk | 45° |
| Clay (dry lump) | 25–40° |
| Clay (wet excavated) | 15° |
| Clover seed | 28° |
| Coconut (shredded) | 45° |
| Coffee bean (fresh) | 35–45° |
| Flour (corn) | 30–40° |
| Flour (wheat) | 45° |
| Granite | 35–40° |
| Gravel (crushed stone) | 45° |
| Gravel (natural w/ sand) | 25–30° |
| Malt | 30–45° |
| Sand (dry) | 34° |
| Sand (water filled) | 15–30° |
| Sand (wet) | 45° |
| Snow | 38° |
| Soil | 30–45° |
| Urea (Granular) | 27° |
| Wheat | 27° |

== With different supports ==
The below media illustrates that while different supports modify the shape of the pile, the angle of repose of the material in question remains the same:

| Support format | Support | Angle of repose |
|---|---|---|
| Rectangle | | |
| Circle | | |
| Square | | |
| Triangle | | |
| Double fork | | |
| Oval | | |
| One pit | | |
| Double pit | | |
| Multiple pit | | |
| Random format | | |

== Exploitation by antlion and wormlion (Vermileonidae) larvae ==
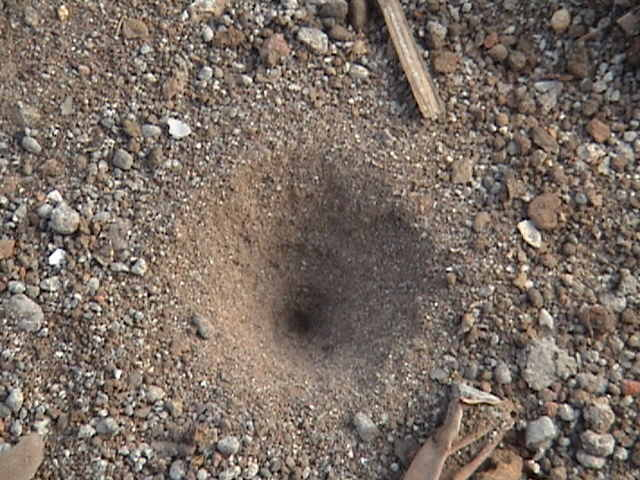
Sand pit trap of the antlion

The larvae of the antlions and the unrelated wormlions Vermileonidae trap small insects such as ants by digging conical pits in loose sand, such that the slope of the walls is effectively at the critical angle of repose for the sand. They achieve this by flinging the loose sand out of the pit and permitting the sand to settle at its critical angle of repose as it falls back. Thus, when a small insect, commonly an ant, blunders into the pit, its weight causes the sand to collapse below it, drawing the victim toward the center where the predator that dug the pit lies in wait under a thin layer of loose sand. The larva assists this process by vigorously flicking sand out from the center of the pit when it detects a disturbance. This undermines the pit walls and causes them to collapse toward the center. The sand that the larva flings also pelts the prey with loose rolling material that prevents it from getting any foothold on the easier slopes that the initial collapse of the slope has presented. The combined effect is to bring the prey down to within grasp of the larva, which then can inject venom and digestive fluids.

== In geotechnics ==
The angle of repose is related to the shear strength of geologic materials, which is relevant in construction and engineering contexts. For granular materials, the size and shape of grains can impact angle of repose significantly. As the roundness of materials increases, the angle of repose decreases since there is less friction between the soil grains.

When the angle of repose is exceeded, mass wasting and rockfall can occur. It is important for many civil and geotechnical engineers to know the angle of repose to avoid structural and natural disasters. As a result, the application of retaining walls can help to retain soil so that the angle of repose is not exceeded.

The angle of repose and the stability of a slope are affected by climatic and non-climatic factors.

== See also ==
The angle of repose plays a part in several topics of technology and science, including:

- Aeolian processes
- Barchan
- Bulk cargo
- Concrete slump test
- Grade (slope)
- Mass wasting
- Oceanic trench
- Retaining wall
- Rotary kiln
- Sand volcano
