= Splint activator =

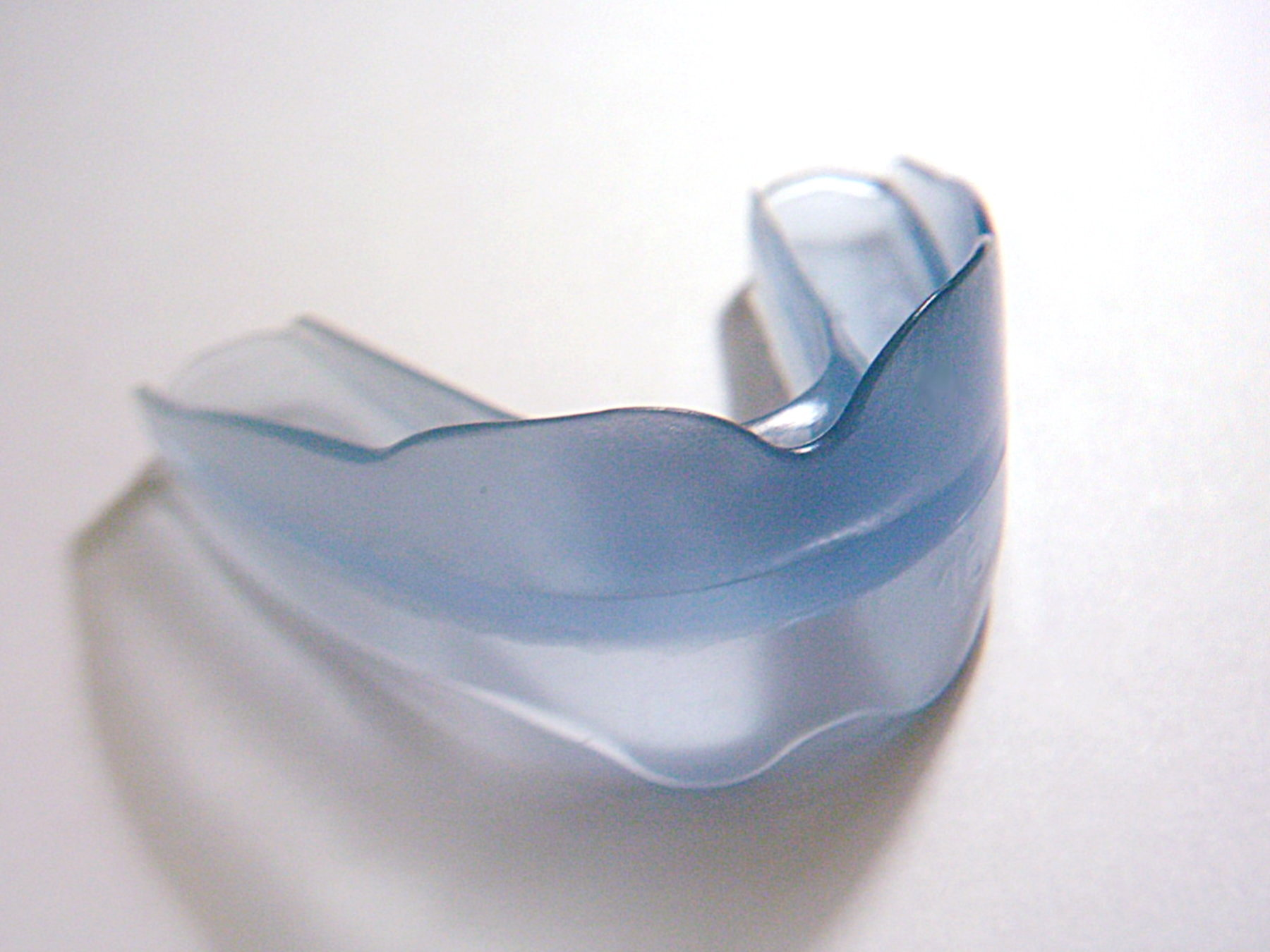
Splint activator type "K3F", frontal view...

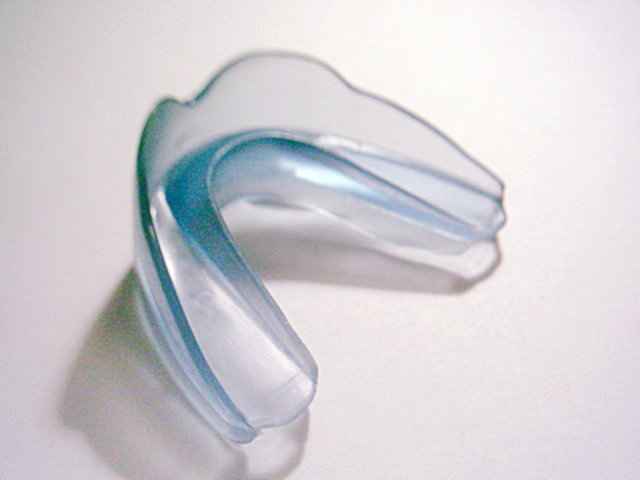
...and back view

The splint activator of Soulet-Besombes is a removable appliance for the treatment of dental and jaw anomalies. It is basically a stylized Activator appliance, which is however not fitted individually, but is mass-produced in various shapes and sizes. The device is also known as Position Trainer or Kaukraft-Kiefer-Former (bite-force jaw former, K3F).

== Design and operation ==
The device is made from flexible material as one single piece. At its center, it is completely even and approximates the shape of an ideal dental arch. This flat part is surrounded by ramp-shaped walls. The teeth of the upper and lower jaw bite into the space between these walls accordingly. Normally, there are no individual tooth slots, with the prominent exception of the Australian Myobrace design.

The appliance sits passively between the upper and lower jaw, and does not exercise any force by itself to the teeth. When the patient bites together, the teeth standing out of line collide with ramp-shaped walls and are moved into their correct position over time. This works due to the principle of the inclined plane and the spring force of the elastic deformation of the device. By biting more or less intensively, the patient can determine themselves how much force is applied.

When the appliance is worn, the lower jaw is positioned into Angle class 1 relation towards the upper jaw. This is supposed to get the jaw muscles used to this position, and to let the patient learn the correct swallowing pattern. The teeth that in this jaw position do not reach the central plane are allowed to erupt, the same way as they would do with a bite-plate applied.

There are special modifications for the treatment of overbite and underbite, however they usually only differ in the shape of the dental arch and in stronger or longer walls.

The device has to be worn at night as well as one hour during daytime. The effect can be increased by doing bite exercises during this time. The wearing comfort is pretty high, however talking is completely impossible. In order to wear the device the patient must be able to breathe through the nose. During the first days, it can fall out of the mouth.

As with any intra-oral appliance, wearing it should not cause sore spots on the gingiva, as this could lead to permanent tissue damage. If it does cause sores, the parts of the device causing the damage have to be cut off as soon as possible.

== History ==
In the early 1950s, the French orthodontists Prof. René Soulet and Prof. André Besombes removed the fixed braces of their patients for the time of the summer holidays. In order to stabilize the results achieved so far, they gave them a confectioned rubber retainer to wear at night. To their own surprise, they discovered afterwards that the tooth and jaw anomalies had not only not worsened but even become better during this time. So they improved their construction and called it Conformateur.

== Usage today ==
The splint activator is a rather exotic appliance, albeit in recent times, the Trainer for Kids (T4K) made by the Australian company Myofunctional Research has gained some acceptance in the early treatment of young patients. Some very few practitioners claim that they can successfully treat patients of any age using the splint activator.
