= Critical angle =

Critical angle may refer to:

- Critical angle (optics), the angle of incidence above which total internal reflection occurs
- Critical angle of attack, in aerodynamics; the angle of attack which produces the maximum lift coefficient
- Critical angle of repose, in engineering; the steepest angle of descent of a slope when the material is on the verge of sliding
