= Shear strength (discontinuity) =

Material property

The shear strength of a discontinuity in a soil or rock mass may have a strong impact on the mechanical behavior of a soil or rock mass. The shear strength of a discontinuity is often considerably lower than the shear strength of the blocks of intact material in between the discontinuities, and therefore influences, for example, tunnel, foundation, or slope engineering, but also the stability of natural slopes. Many slopes, natural and man-made, fail due to a low shear strength of discontinuities in the soil or rock mass in the slope. The deformation characteristics of a soil or rock mass are also influenced by the shear strength of the discontinuities. For example, the modulus of deformation is reduced, and the deformation becomes plastic (i.e. non-reversible deformation on reduction of stress) rather than elastic (i.e. reversible deformation). This may cause, for example, larger settlement of foundations, which is also permanent even if the load is only temporary. Furthermore, the shear strength of discontinuities influences the stress distribution in a soil or rock mass.

== Shear strength ==
The shear strength along a discontinuity in a soil or rock mass in geotechnical engineering is governed by the persistence of the discontinuity, roughness of discontinuity surfaces, infill material in the discontinuity, presence and pressure of gasses and fluids (e.g. water, oil), and possible solution (e.g. karst) and cementation along the discontinuity. Further the shear strength is dependent on whether the discontinuity has moved before in the geological history (i.e. are the asperities on opposing walls of the discontinuity fitting or non-fitting, or have the asperities been sheared off).

== Determination shear strength ==
Only for simple models of discontinuities the shear strength can be analytically calculated. For real discontinuities no analytical calculation method exists. Testing on various scales in the laboratory or in the field, or empirical calculations based on characterizing the discontinuity are used to establish the shear strength.

== Discontinuity shear strength tests ==
- Direct shear test or (Golder) shearbox test
- Punch-through shear test
- Tilt test (geotechnical engineering)
- Triaxial test

== Empirical calculations based on characterization ==
- Barton-Bandis shear criterion
- Sliding criterion
