= Franz Bruno Hofmann =

Austrian-German physiologist

Franz Bruno Hofmann (24 November 1869, Skalka – 6 June 1926, Marburg) was an Austrian-German physiologist.

In 1894 he received his medical doctorate from the German University in Prague, and for several years worked as an assistant to physiologist Ewald Hering, first in Prague (1893–95), then afterwards at the University of Leipzig (1895–1905). At Leipzig, with ophthalmologist Alfred Bielschowsky, he conducted studies on fusion and cyclodeviation in paresis of the superior oblique muscle as well as on congenital hyperfunction of the superior oblique muscle.

In 1902 he became an associate professor at Leipzig, and three years later became a full professor of physiology at the University of Innsbruck. Later on, he served as a professor at the universities of Prague (from 1911), Königsberg (from 1913), Marburg (from 1916, rector in 1916/17), Bonn (1922/23) and Berlin (1923–26). In 1926 he became a member of the Prussian Academy of Sciences.

== Selected works ==
- Beiträge zur Lehre von der Herzinnervation, 1898 – Contributions to the study of cardiac innervation.
- Die Lehre vom Raumsinn des Auges, (2 volumes. 1920) – Theory on the sense of space involving the eye.
- Über die Sehrichtungen, 1925 – On the viewing direction.
