= Carl Strehl =

German educator

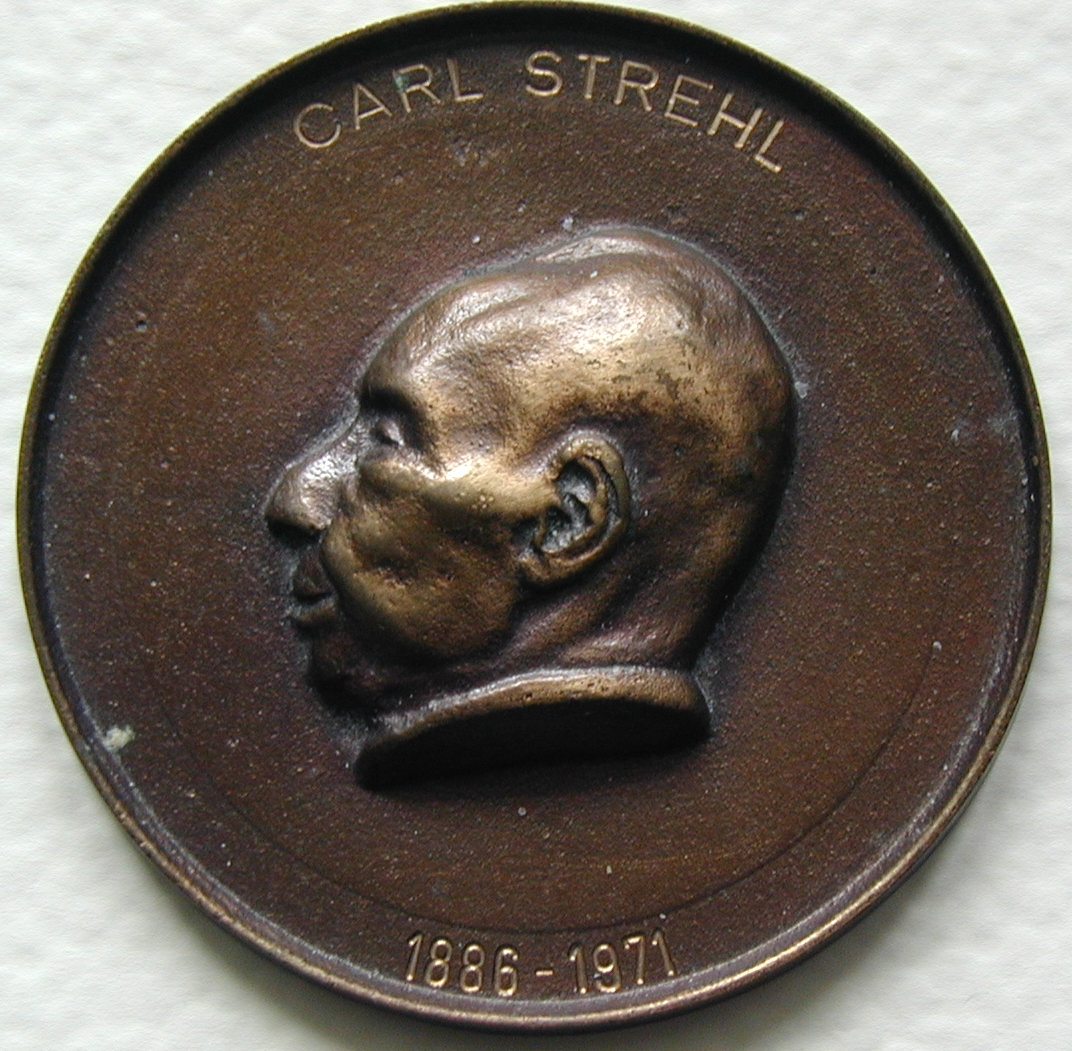

Carl Strehl (July 12, 1886 – August 18, 1971) was a German educator born in Berlin who was influential in the teaching of the blind.

== History ==
In December 1907, Strehl lost his eyesight while working in a chemical factory in New York. Later, after returning to Europe, he commenced with studies in Hamburg. In 1915, he was hired by University of Marburg ophthalmologist Alfred Bielschowsky (1871–1940) to assist with World War I soldiers who had been blinded by shell fragments and poison gas.

In March 1916 Strehl and Bielschowsky established the Verein blinder Akademiker Deutschlands (German Society of Blind Academicians), an association to provide higher education assistance for the blind. Shortly afterwards he founded the Deutsche Blindenstudienanstalt (German Blind Study Institute; aka Carl Strehl-Schule) for the visually impaired, which today is a nationally recognized institution in Marburg.

In addition, Strehl was vice-president of the World Council for the Welfare of the Blind, and was a prominent member of the International Council of Educators of Blind Youth.
