= Tilt test (geotechnical engineering) =

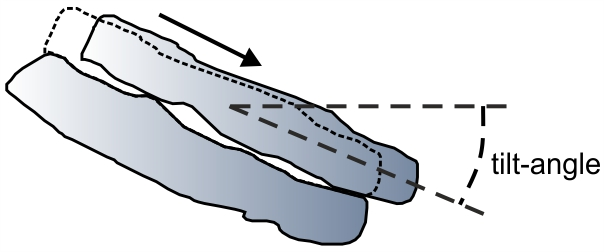
Tilt test on a fitting discontinuity

In geomechanics, a tilt test is a simple test to estimate the shear strength parameters of a discontinuity. Two pieces of rock containing a discontinuity are held in hand or mounted in test equipment with the discontinuity horizontal. The sample is slowly tilted until the top block moves. The angle with the horizontal at onset of movement is called the tilt-angle.

The size of the specimen is limited to 10–20 cm for hand-held tests, while machine-operated tilt test equipment may handle up to meter-sized samples. In the field, the angle can be determined most easily with an inclinometer as present in most geological or structural compasses.

== Tilt-angle ==
The tilt-angle equals the material friction of the discontinuity wall plus the roughness i-angle (tilt-angle = φ_{wall material} + i) if no real cohesion is present (i.e. no cementing or gluing material between the two blocks), no infill material is present, the asperities do not break, and the walls of the discontinuity are completely fitting at the start of the test, while if the walls of the discontinuity are completely non-fitting, the tilt-angle equals the friction of the material of the discontinuity walls (tilt-angle = φ_{wall material}). If cementation or gluing material is present or asperities break, the tilt-angle represents a combination of the (apparent or real) cohesion and the friction along the discontinuity. If infill material is present, the tilt-angle is governed partially or completely by the infill, depending on the thickness of the infill and height of asperities.

== See also ==
- Direct shear test
- Triaxial shear test
