= Česká Metuje =

- Municipality
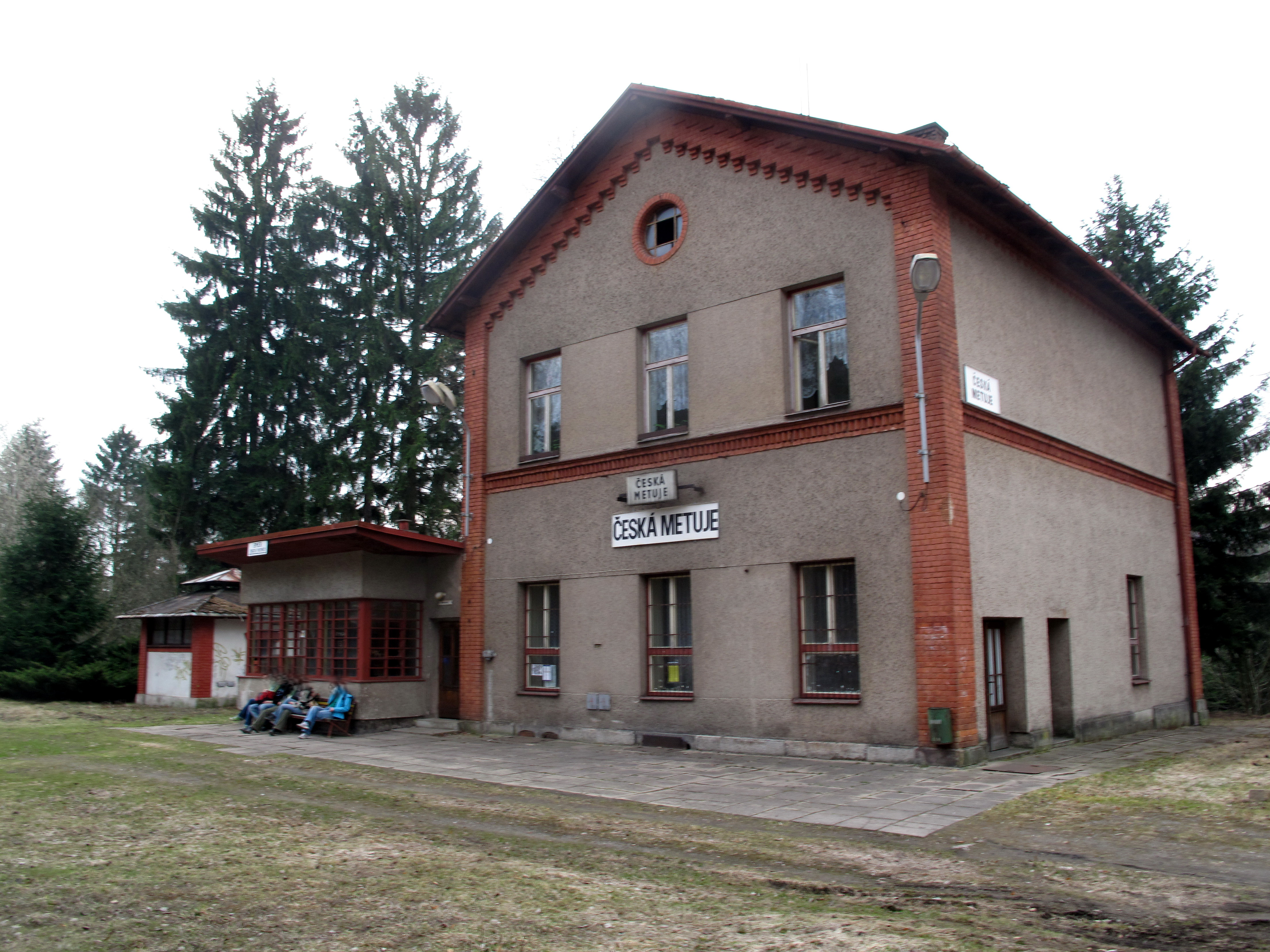
- Train station

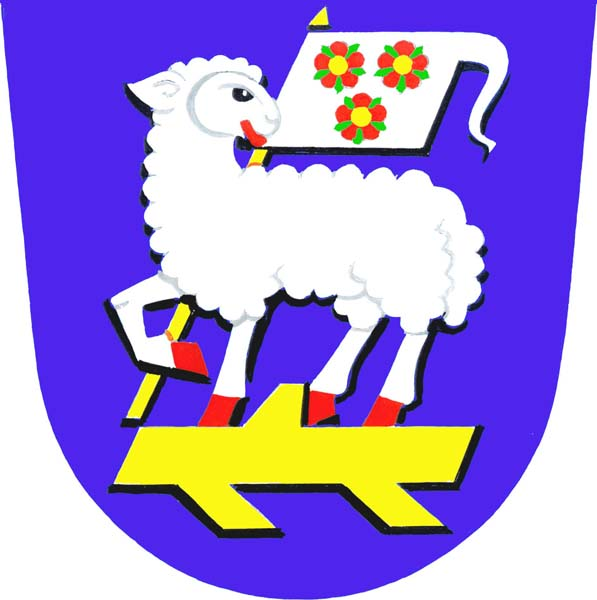
- Flag Coat of arms

- Location in the Czech Republic
- Coordinates: 50°32′47″N 16°10′47″E
- Country: Czech Republic
- Region: Hradec Králové
- District: Náchod
- First mentioned: 1406

Area
  - Total: 9.70 km^{2} (3.75 sq mi)
- Elevation: 432 m (1,417 ft)

Population (2026-01-01)
  - Total: 301
  - Density: 31.0/km^{2} (80.4/sq mi)
- Time zone: UTC+1 (CET)
  - Summer (DST): UTC+2 (CEST)
- Postal codes: 549 31, 549 56
- Website: www.ceskametuje.cz

Česká Metuje (German: Böhmisch Matha) is a municipality and village in Náchod District in the Hradec Králové Region of the Czech Republic. It has about 300 inhabitants. The village of Skalka within the municipality has well preserved folk architecture and is protected as a village monument zone.

== Administrative division ==
Česká Metuje consists of three municipal parts (in brackets population according to the 2021 census):

- Česká Metuje (207)
- Skalka (16)
- Vlásenka (62)

== Demographics ==
Historical population
Year	Pop.	±%
1869	1,352	—
1880	1,293	−4.4%
1890	1,201	−7.1%
1900	1,089	−9.3%
1910	1,059	−2.8%
1921	954	−9.9%
1930	945	−0.9%
1950	506	−46.5%
1961	491	−3.0%
1970	437	−11.0%
1980	394	−9.8%
1991	343	−12.9%
2001	333	−2.9%
2011	299	−10.2%
2021	285	−4.7%
Source: Censuses

== Notable people ==
- Franz Bruno Hofmann (1869–1926), Austrian physiologist
