= Alfred Bielschowsky =

German ophthalmologist (1871–1940)

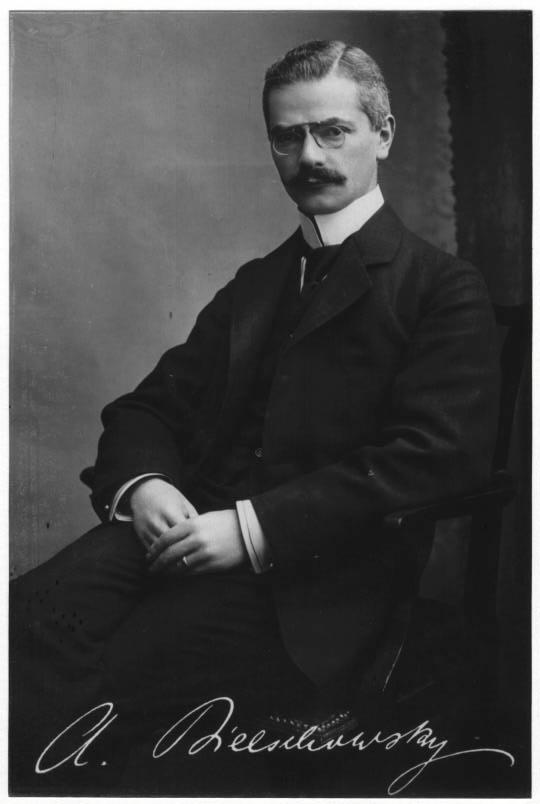
Alfred Bielschowsky (1871-1940)

Alfred Bielschowsky (December 11, 1871 – April 5, 1940) was a German ophthalmologist. His specialty was physiology and pathology of the eye, particularly regarding research on eye movement, space perception, and diagnosis of oculomotor anomalies.

Bielschowsky was born in Namslau (Namysłów), Prussian Silesia. After attending the Königliches Katholisches Gymnasium of Glatz (Kłodzko), he studied medicine at the University of Breslau (Wrocław) and at the University of Heidelberg. At Heidelberg, he was a student of ophthalmologist Theodor Leber (1840-1917). Afterwards, he studied medicine at the University of Berlin, attending the lectures of Karl Ernst Theodor Schweigger (1830-1905) and graduating in 1893. He received his medical license in Leipzig on March 1 of the same year.

Bielschowsky subsequently studied and worked at the eye clinic at the University of Leipzig, receiving his habilitation in 1900 and becoming head physician of the clinic in 1906. While at Leipzig, he worked under physiologist Ewald Hering (1834-1918) and with Franz Bruno Hofmann (1869-1926), and conducted studies of fusion and cyclodeviation in superior oblique muscle paresis. In 1912, Bielschowsky was appointed chair of ophthalmology at the University of Marburg.

During World War I, Bielschowsky established a hospital ward and Braille instruction for the treatment of blinded soldiers. In 1916, along with Carl Strehl (1886-1971), he founded the Verein blinder Akademiker Deutschlands (Association of Blinded Academics of Germany). For his wartime contributions, he was awarded the Iron Cross for War Aid from Paul von Hindenburg and honored with the title of Geheimer Medizinalrat (Privy Medical Counselor) by Wilhelm II, German Emperor.

In 1923, Bielschowsky was appointed chair of ophthalmology at the University of Breslau. While here, he published "Die Lähmungen der Augenmuskeln" (1932), an influential work on eye muscle disturbances.

Because of his Jewish heritage and Nazi persecution, Bielschowsky was fired from his position in 1934, later emigrating to the United States (1936). In 1937, he became head of the Dartmouth Eye Institute at Dartmouth College in Hanover, New Hampshire. However, he died suddenly in 1940. In the same year, his "Lectures on motor anomalies" was published.

== Associated eponym ==
- Bielschowsky's head tilt test: A test for palsy of the superior oblique muscle caused by damage to cranial nerve IV (trochlear nerve).
