= Persistence (discontinuity) =

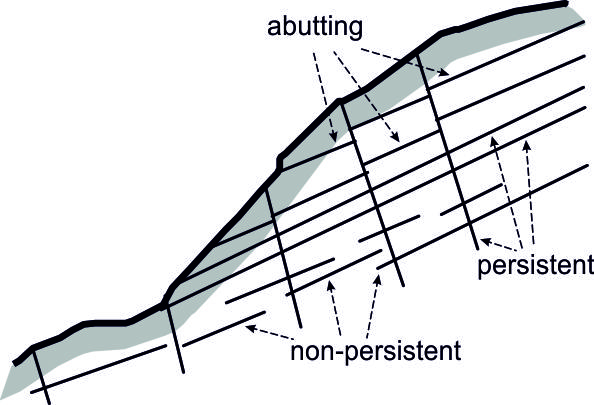
Persistence of discontinuities in a soil or rock mass.

Persistence determines the possibilities of relative movement along a discontinuity in a soil or rock mass in geotechnical engineering. Discontinuities are usually differentiated in persistent, non-persistent, and abutting discontinuities (figure).

== Persistent discontinuity ==
A persistent discontinuity is a continuous plane in a soil or rock mass. Shear displacement takes place if the shear stress along the discontinuity plane exceeds the shear strength of the discontinuity plane.

== Non-persistent discontinuity ==
A non-persistent discontinuity ends in intact soil or rock. Before movement of the material on both sides of a non-persistent discontinuity is possible, the discontinuity has to extend and break through intact material. As intact material has virtually always far higher shear strength than the discontinuity, a non-persistent discontinuity will have larger shear strength than a persistent discontinuity.

== Abutting discontinuity ==
An abutting discontinuity abuts against another discontinuity. Abutting discontinuities might continue at the other side of the intersecting discontinuity, however, with a displacement to give so-called ‘stepped planes’. Shear displacement along the discontinuity can take place if the shear strength along the discontinuity plane is exceeded, and the blocks of material against which the discontinuity abuts can move or break.

== Anisotropic persistence ==
A discontinuity might be persistent in dip direction but be not persistent perpendicular to the dip direction or vice versa.

== See also ==
- Discontinuity (geotechnical engineering)
- Rock mechanics
- Shear strength (discontinuity)
