= Direct shear test =

Test to measure sheer strength

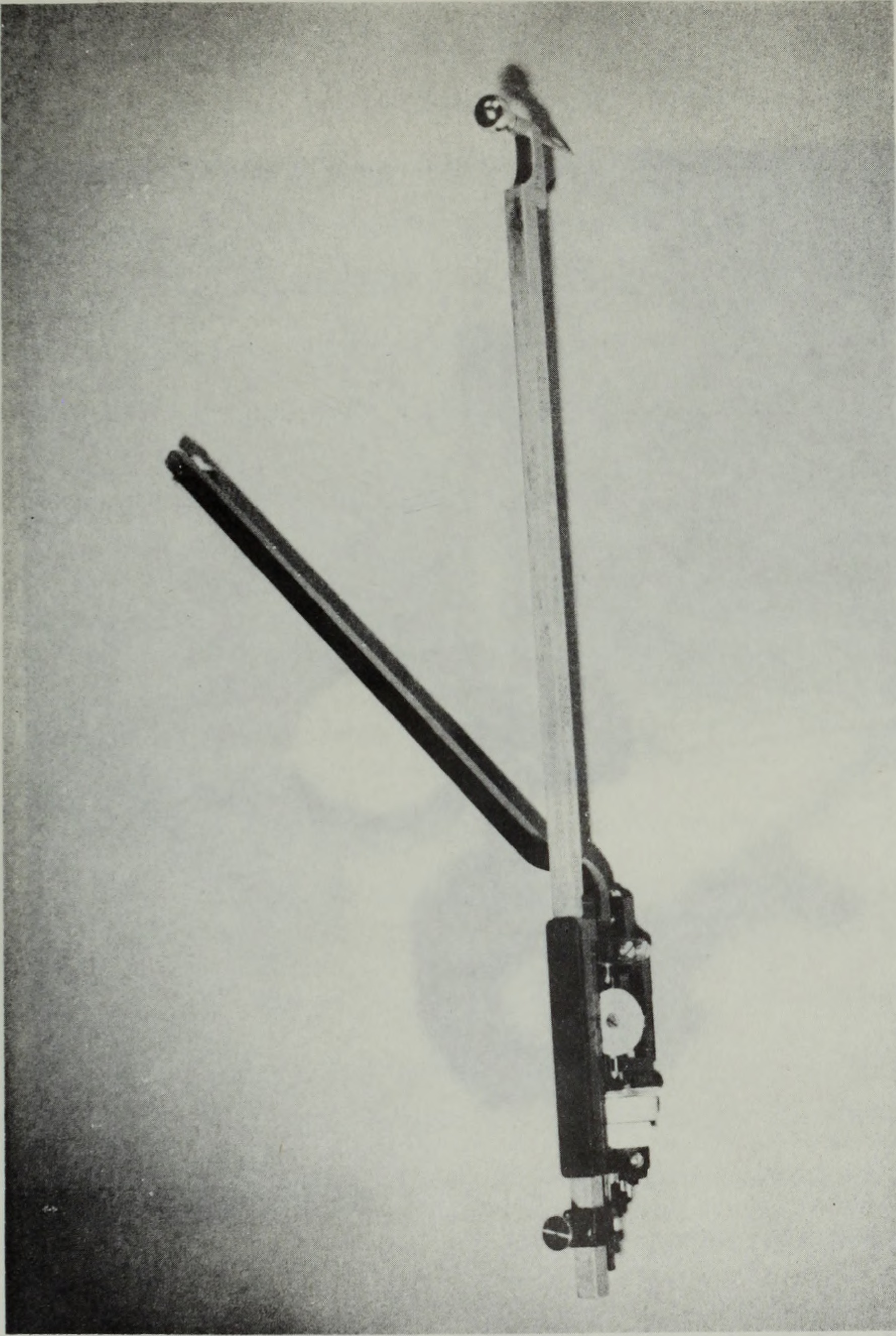
Direct shear testing of marine sediments.

A direct shear test is a laboratory or field test used by geotechnical engineers to measure the shear strength properties of soil or rock material, or of discontinuities in soil or rock masses.

The U.S. and U.K. standards defining how the test should be performed are ASTM D 3080, AASHTO T236 and BS 1377-7:1990, respectively. For rock the test is generally restricted to rock with (very) low shear strength. The test is, however, standard practice to establish the shear strength properties of discontinuities in rock.

The test is performed on three or four specimens from a relatively undisturbed soil sample. A specimen is placed in a shear box which has two stacked rings to hold the sample; the contact between the two rings is at approximately the mid-height of the sample. A confining stress is applied vertically to the specimen, and the upper ring is pulled laterally until the sample fails, or through a specified strain. The load applied and the strain induced is recorded at frequent intervals to determine a stress–strain curve for each confining stress. Several specimens are tested at varying confining stresses to determine the shear strength parameters, the soil cohesion (c) and the angle of internal friction, commonly known as friction angle ($\phi$). The results of the tests on each specimen are plotted on a graph with the peak (or residual) stress on the y-axis and the confining stress on the x-axis. The y-intercept of the curve which fits the test results is the cohesion, and the slope of the line or curve is the friction angle.

Direct shear tests can be performed under several conditions. The sample is normally saturated before the test is run, but can be run at the in-situ moisture content. The rate of strain can be varied to create a test of undrained or drained conditions, depending on whether the strain is applied slowly enough for water in the sample to prevent pore-water pressure buildup. A direct shear test machine is required to perform the test. The test using the direct shear machine determines the consolidated drained shear strength of a soil material in direct shear.

The advantages of the direct shear test over other shear tests are the simplicity of setup and equipment used, and the ability to test under differing saturation, drainage, and consolidation conditions. These advantages have to be weighed against the difficulty of measuring pore-water pressure when testing in undrained conditions, and possible spuriously high results from forcing the failure plane to occur in a specific location.

The test equipment and procedures are slightly different for test on discontinuities.

== See also ==
- Geotechnical investigation
- Shear strength (discontinuity)
- Tilt test (geotechnical engineering)
- Triaxial shear test
