= Discontinuity (geotechnical engineering) =

Surface dividing a soil or rock mass by differing properties

In geotechnical engineering, a discontinuity (often referred to as a joint) is a plane or surface that marks a change in physical or chemical characteristics in a soil or rock mass. A discontinuity can be, for example, a bedding, schistosity, foliation, joint, cleavage, fracture, fissure, crack, or fault plane. A division is made between mechanical and integral discontinuities. Discontinuities may occur multiple times with broadly the same mechanical characteristics in a discontinuity set, or may be a single discontinuity. A discontinuity makes a soil or rock mass anisotropic.

== Mechanical ==
A mechanical discontinuity is a plane of physical weakness where the tensile strength perpendicular to the discontinuity or the shear strength along the discontinuity is lower than that of the surrounding soil or rock material.

== Integral ==
An integral discontinuity is a discontinuity that is as strong as the surrounding soil or rock material. Integral discontinuities can change into mechanical discontinuities due to physical or chemical processes (e.g. weathering) that change the mechanical characteristics of the discontinuity.

== Set or family ==
Various geological processes create discontinuities at a broadly regular spacing. For example, bedding planes are the result of a repeated sedimentation cycle with a change of sedimentation material or change in structure and texture of the sediment at regular intervals, folding creates joints at regular separations to allow for shrinkage or expansion of the rock material, etc. Normally discontinuities with the same origin have broadly the same characteristics in terms of shear strength, spacing between discontinuities, roughness, infill, etc. The orientations of discontinuities with the same origin are related to the process that has created them and to the geological history of the rock mass. A discontinuity set or family denotes a series of discontinuities for which the geological origin (history, etc.), the orientation, spacing, and the mechanical characteristics (shear strength, roughness, infill material, etc.) are broadly the same.

== Single ==
A discontinuity may exist as a single feature (e.g. fault, isolated joint or fracture) and in some circumstances, a discontinuity is treated as a single discontinuity although it belongs to a discontinuity set, in particular if the spacing is very wide compared to the size of the engineering application or to the size of the geotechnical unit.

== Characterization ==
Various international standards exist to describe and characterize discontinuities in geomechanical terms, such as ISO 14689-1:2003 and ISRM.

== See also ==
- Asperity (geotechnical engineering)
- Exfoliating granite
- Persistence (discontinuity)
- Rock mass classification
- Rock mechanics
- Shear strength (discontinuity)
- Sliding criterion (geotechnical engineering)
- Tilt test (geotechnical engineering)
