= Shear strength =

Capacity of a material or structure to resist failure while under shear stress

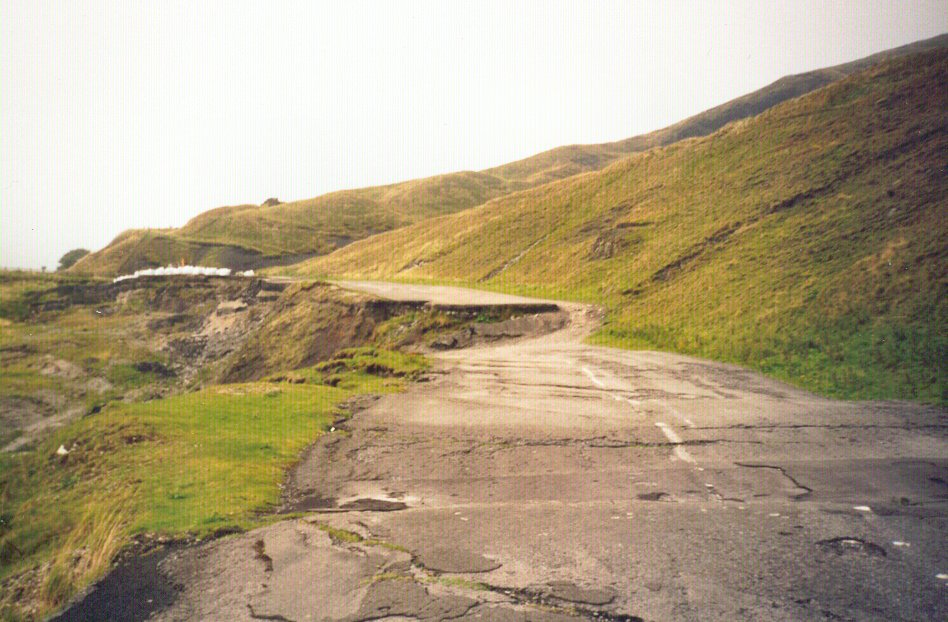
Mam Tor road destroyed by subsidence and shear, near Castleton, Derbyshire.

In engineering, shear strength is the strength of a material or component against the type of yield or structural failure when the material or component fails in shear. A shear load is a force that tends to produce a sliding failure on a material along a plane that is parallel to the direction of the force. When a paper is cut with scissors, the paper fails in shear.

In structural and mechanical engineering, the shear strength of a component is important for designing the dimensions and materials to be used for the manufacture or construction of the component (e.g. beams, plates, or bolts). In a reinforced concrete beam, the main purpose of reinforcing bar (rebar) stirrups is to increase the shear strength.

== Equations ==
A shear force is applied to the top of the rectangle that deform the rectangle into a parallelogram. Having a higher shear modulus of elasticity increases the force needed to deform the rectangle.

For shear stress $\tau$ applies

$$\tau = \frac {\sigma_1 - \sigma_3}{2} ,$$

where

$\sigma_1$ is major principal stress and
$\sigma_3$ is minor principal stress.

In general: ductile materials (e.g. aluminum) fail in shear, whereas brittle materials (e.g. cast iron) fail in tension.

To calculate:

Given total force at failure (F) and the force-resisting area (e.g. the cross-section of a bolt loaded in shear), ultimate shear strength ($\tau$) is:

$$\tau = \frac {F}{A} = \frac {F}{\pi r_\text{bolt}^2} = \frac {4F}{\pi d_\text{bolt}^2}$$

For average shear stress

$\tau_\text{avg} = \frac{V}{A}$

where

$\tau_\text{avg}$ is the average shear stress,
$V$ is the shear force applied to each section of the part, and
$A$ is the area of the section.

Average shear stress can also be defined as the total force of $V$ as

$$V=\int \tau d A$$

This is only the average stress, actual stress distribution is not uniform. In real world applications, this equation only gives an approximation and the maximum shear stress would be higher. Stress is not often equally distributed across a part so the shear strength would need to be higher to account for the estimate.

== Comparison ==
As a very rough guide relating tensile, yield, and shear strengths:

Material	Ultimate Strength Relationship	Yield Strength Relationship
Steels	USS = approx. 0.75*UTS	SYS = approx. 0.58*TYS
Ductile Iron	USS = approx. 0.9*UTS	SYS = approx. 0.75*TYS .
Malleable Iron	USS = approx. 1.0*UTS	
Wrought Iron	USS = approx. 0.83*UTS	
Cast Iron	USS = approx. 1.3*UTS	
Aluminums	USS = approx. 0.65*UTS	SYS = approx. 0.55*TYS

USS: Ultimate Shear Strength, UTS: Ultimate Tensile Strength, SYS: Shear Yield Stress, TYS: Tensile Yield Stress

There are no published standard values for shear strength like with tensile and yield strength. Instead, it is common for it to be estimated as 60% of the ultimate tensile strength. Shear strength can be measured by a torsion test where it is equal to their torsional strength.

Material	Ultimate stress (Ksi)	Ultimate stress (MPa)
Fiberglass/epoxy (23 ^{o} C)	7.82	53.9

When values measured from physical samples are desired, a number of testing standards are available, covering different material categories and testing conditions. In the US, ASTM standards for measuring shear strength include ASTM B769, B831, D732, D4255, D5379, and D7078. Internationally, ISO testing standards for shear strength include ISO 3597, 12579, and 14130.

== See also ==
- Shear modulus
- Shear stress
- Shear strain
- Shear strength (soil)
- Shear strength (Discontinuity)
- Strength of materials
- Tensile strength
