= Parks–Bielschowsky three-step test =

- Synonyms: Park's three-step test, Bielschowsky head tilt test
- Test of: Extraocular muscle

The Parks–Bielschowsky three-step test, also known as Park's three-step test or Bielschowsky head tilt test, is a method used to isolate the paretic extraocular muscle, particularly superior oblique muscle and trochlear nerve (fourth cranial nerve), in acquired vertical double vision. It was originally described by Marshall M. Parks.

== Bielschowsky's head tilt test ==
- Step 1: Determine which eye is hypertrophic in primary position. If there is right hypertropia in primary position, then the depressors of the R eye (IR/SO) or the elevators of the L eye are weak (SR/IO).
- Step 2: Determine whether the hypertropia increases on right or left gaze. The vertical rectus muscles have their greatest vertical action when the eye is abducted. The oblique muscles have their greatest vertical action when the eye is adducted.
- Step 3: Determine whether the hypertropia increases on right or left head tilt. During right head tilt, the right eye intorts (SO/SR) and the left eye extorts (IO/IR).

When a healthy individual tilts their head, the superior oblique and superior rectus muscles of the eye closest to the shoulder keep the eye level. The inferior oblique and inferior rectus muscles keep the other eye level. In patients with superior oblique palsy, the superior rectus muscle's action is not counteracted by the superior oblique muscles. This leads to vertical deviation of the affected eye when the head is tilted towards the affected eye. However, there is no deviation when the head is tilted towards the unaffected eye because the superior oblique muscle is not stimulated in the affected eye, but rather it is stimulated in the unaffected eye. When there is a discrepancy in ocular deviation based on which way the head is tilted, the patient is diagnosed with unilateral palsy of the superior oblique muscle due to damage in the Trochlear Nerve.

People with superior oblique palsy on one side experience double vision, which is improved or even abolished by tilting the head towards the shoulder on the unaffected side. Tilting the head towards the shoulder on the affected side will make the double vision worse by causing increased separation of the two images seen by the patient.

Lateralization of side of defect based on Parks-Bielschowsky three-step test:

1. Ipsilesional central gaze hypertropia
2. Vertical diplopia greater in contralesional than ipsilesional gaze
3. Vertical diplopia greater in ipsilesional than contralesional head tilt

== History ==
The physiologic basis of the head tilt test was explained by Alfred Bielschowsky and Hofmann in 1935. However, Nagel described it 30 years prior to Bielschowsky when he noted that the combined action of the superior rectus muscle and the superior oblique muscle of one eye and of the inferior rectus and inferior oblique muscles in the fellow eye causes incycloduction and excycloduction. The procedure that we now follow was given by Marshall M. Parks.
