= Triaxial shear test =

Stress test with different levels of stress in each perpendicular direction

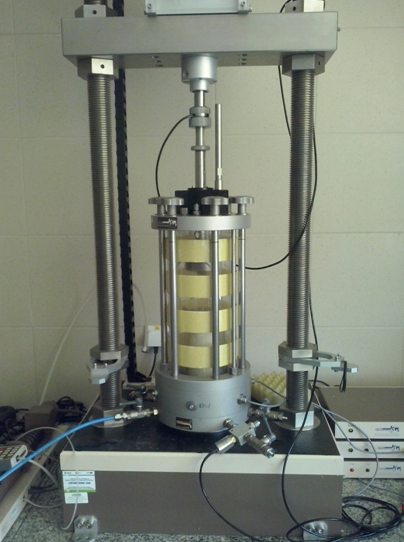
Triaxial apparatus with sample attached ready for testing.

In materials science, a triaxial shear test is a common method to measure the mechanical properties of many deformable solids, especially soil (e.g., sand, clay) and rock, and other granular materials or powders. There are several variations on the test. In a triaxial shear test, stress is applied to a sample of the material being tested in a way which results in stresses along one axis being different from the stresses in perpendicular directions. This is typically achieved by placing the sample between two parallel platens which apply stress in one (usually vertical) direction, and applying fluid pressure to the specimen to apply stress in the perpendicular directions.

The application of different compressive stresses in the test apparatus causes shear stress to develop in the sample; the loads can be increased and deflections monitored until failure of the sample. During the test, the surrounding fluid is pressurized, and the stress on the platens is increased until the material in the cylinder fails and forms sliding regions within itself, known as shear bands. The geometry of the shearing in a triaxial test typically causes the sample to become shorter while bulging out along the sides. The stress on the platen is then reduced and the water pressure pushes the sides back in, causing the sample to grow taller again. This cycle is usually repeated several times while collecting stress and strain data about the sample. During the test the pore pressures of fluids (e.g., water, oil) or gasses in the sample may be measured using Bishop's pore pressure apparatus.

From the triaxial test data, it is possible to extract fundamental material parameters about the sample, including its angle of shearing resistance, apparent cohesion, and dilatancy angle. These parameters are then used in computer models to predict how the material will behave in a larger-scale engineering application. An example would be to predict the stability of the soil on a slope, whether the slope will collapse or whether the soil will support the shear stresses of the slope and remain in place. Triaxial tests are used along with other tests to make such engineering predictions.

During the shearing, a granular material will typically have a net gain or loss of volume. If it had originally been in a dense state, then it typically gains volume, a characteristic known as Reynolds' dilatancy. If it had originally been in a very loose state, then contraction may occur before the shearing begins or in conjunction with the shearing.

Sometimes, testing of cohesive samples is done with no confining pressure, in an unconfined compression test. This requires much simpler and less expensive apparatus and sample preparation, though the applicability is limited to samples that the sides won't crumble when exposed, and the confining stress being lower than the in-situ stress gives results which may be overly conservative. The compression test performed for concrete strength testing is essentially the same test, on apparatus designed for the larger samples and higher loads typical of concrete testing.

== Test execution ==
For soil samples, the specimen is contained in a cylindrical latex sleeve with a flat, circular metal plate or platen closing off the top and bottom ends. This cylinder is placed into a bath of a hydraulic fluid to provide pressure along the sides of the cylinder. The top platen can then be mechanically driven up or down along the axis of the cylinder to squeeze the material. The distance that the upper platen travels is measured as a function of the force required to move it, as the pressure of the surrounding water is carefully controlled. The net change in volume of the material can also be measured by how much water moves in or out of the surrounding bath, but is typically measured - when the sample is saturated with water - by measuring the amount of water that flows into or out of the sample's pores.

=== Rock ===
For testing of high-strength rock, the sleeve may be a thin metal sheeting rather than latex. Triaxial testing on strong rock is fairly seldom done because the high forces and pressures required to break a rock sample require costly and cumbersome testing equipment.

=== Effective stress ===
The effective stress on the sample can be measured by using a porous surface on one platen, and measuring the pressure of the fluid (usually water) during the test, then calculating the effective stress from the total stress and pore pressure.

=== Triaxial test to determine the shear strength of a discontinuity ===
The triaxial test can be used to determine the shear strength of a discontinuity. A homogeneous and isotropic sample fails due to shear stresses in the sample. If a sample with a discontinuity is orientated such that the discontinuity is about parallel to the plane in which maximum shear stress will be developed during the test, the sample will fail due to shear displacement along the discontinuity, and hence, the shear strength of a discontinuity can be calculated.

== Types of triaxial tests ==
There are several variations of the triaxial test:

=== Consolidated drained (CD) ===
In a 'consolidated drained' test, the sample is consolidated and sheared in compression slowly to allow pore pressures built up by the shearing to dissipate. The rate of axial deformation is kept constant, i.e., strain is controlled. The test allows the sample and the pore pressures to fully consolidate (i.e., adjust) to the surrounding stresses. The test may take a long time to allow the sample to adjust, in particular low permeability samples need a long time to drain and adjust strain to stress levels.

=== Consolidated undrained (CU) ===
In a 'consolidated undrained' test, the sample is not allowed to drain. The shear characteristics are measured under undrained conditions, and the sample is assumed to be fully saturated. Measuring the pore pressures in the sample (sometimes called CUpp) allows for approximating the consolidated-drained strength. Shear speed is often calculated based on the rate of consolidation under a specific confining pressure (while saturated). Confining pressures can vary anywhere from 1 psi to 100 psi or greater, sometimes requiring special load cells capable of handling higher pressures.

=== Unconsolidated undrained ===
In an 'unconsolidated undrained' test, the loads are applied quickly, and the sample is not allowed to consolidate during the test. The sample is compressed at a constant rate (strain-controlled).

=== True triaxial test ===
Triaxial testing systems have been developed to allow independent stress control in three perpendicular directions. This enables the investigation of stress paths not capable of being generated in axisymmetric triaxial test machines, which can be useful in studies of cemented sands and anisotropic soils.

The test cell is cubical, and there are six separate plates applying pressure to the specimen, with LVDTs reading the movement of each plate. Pressure in the third direction can be applied using hydrostatic pressure in the test chamber, requiring only four stress application assemblies. The apparatus is significantly more complex than for axisymmetric triaxial tests and is, therefore, less commonly used.

=== Free end condition in triaxial testing ===
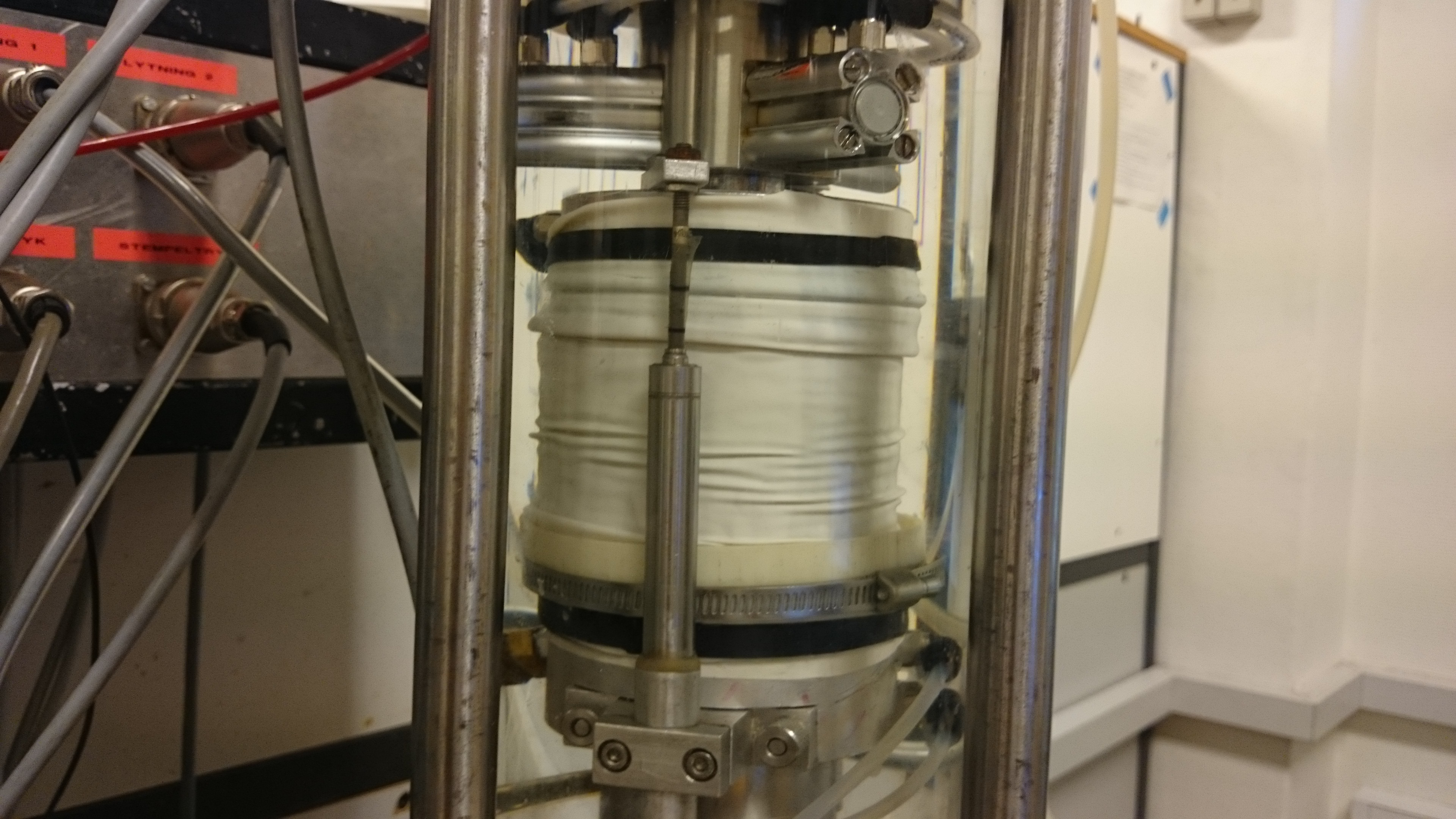
The Danish triaxial in action

Triaxial tests of classical construction had been criticized for their nonuniform stress and strain field imposed within the specimen during larger deformation amplitudes. The highly localized discontinuity within a shear zone is caused by the combination of rough end plates and specimen height.

To test specimens during larger deformation amplitude, "new" and "improved" version of the triaxial apparatus were made. The "new" and the "improved" triaxial follow the same principle - sample height is reduced to one diameter height, and friction with the end plates is canceled.

The classical apparatus uses rough end plates - the whole surface of the piston head is made up of rough, porous filter. In upgraded apparatuses the tough end plates are replaced with smooth, polished glass, with a small filter at the center. This configuration allows a specimen to slide / expand horizontally while sliding along the polished glass. Thus, the contact zone between sample and the end plates does not buildup unnecessary shear friction, and a linear / isotropic stress field within the specimen is sustained.

Due to extremely uniform, near isotropic stress field - isotropic yielding takes place. During isotropic yielding volumetric (dilatational) strain is isotopically distributed within the specimen, this improves measurement of volumetric response during CD tests and pore water pressure during CU loading. Also, isotropic yielding makes the specimen expand radially in uniform manner, as it is compressed axially. The walls of a cylindrical specimen remain straight and vertical even during large strain amplitudes (50% strain amplitude was documented by Vardoulakis (1980), using "improved" triaxial, on non saturated sand). This is in contrast with classical setup, where the specimen forms a bugle in the center, while keeping a constant radius at the contact with the end plates.

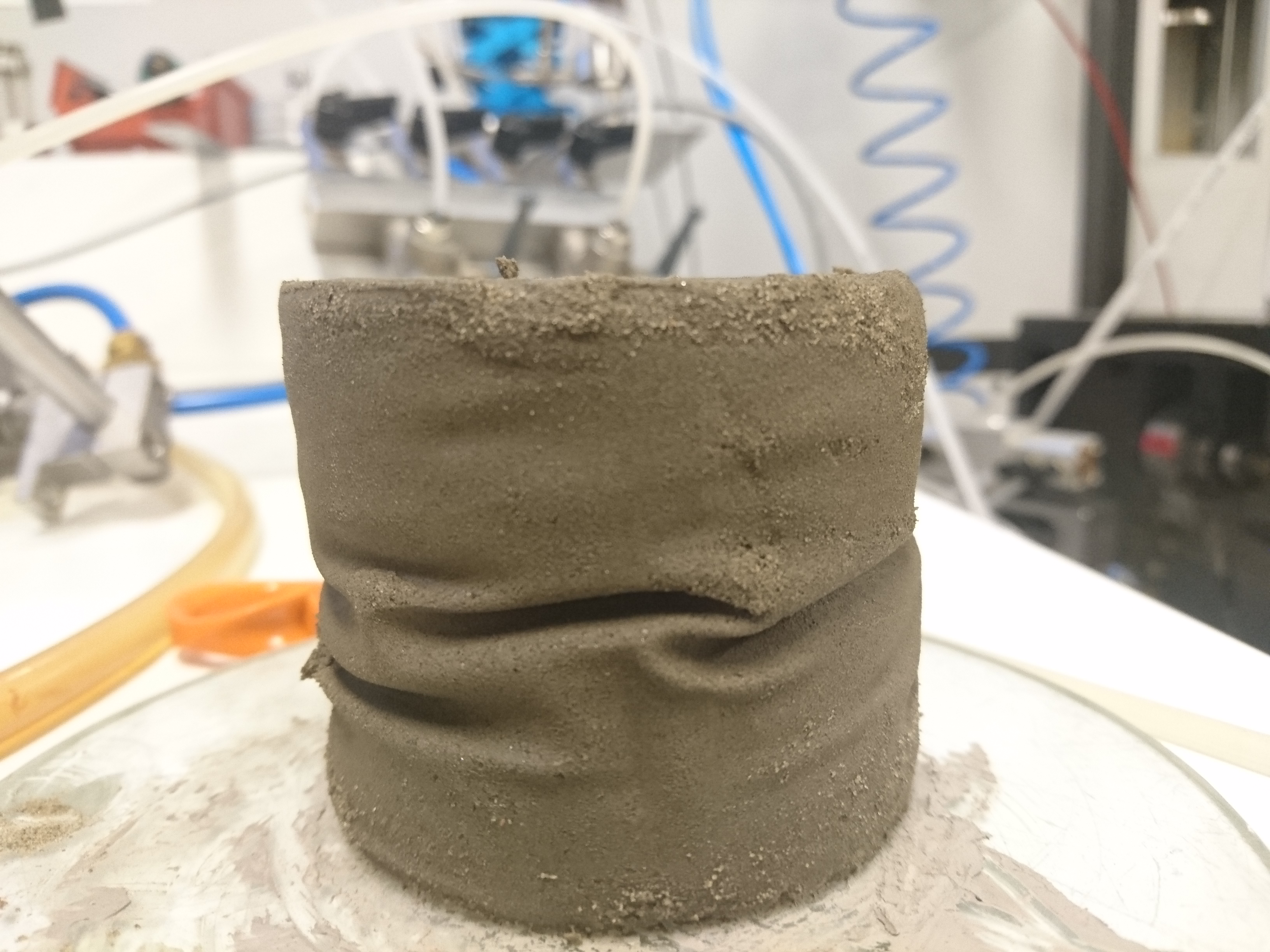
Post-liquefaction testing. The fine sand specimen was liquefied during consolidates undrained (CU) cycles and recovered with consolidated drained (CD) cycles many times. The wrinkles formed due to the volume change imposed by iterating between CU liquefaction and draining. In a liquefied state the sample becomes soft enough to imprint thin latex. During CD cycles - stiff enough to preserve the imprinted pattern.

The "new" apparatus has been upgraded to "the Danish triaxial" by L.B.Ibsen. The Danish triaxial can be used for testing all soil types. It provides improved measurements of volumetric response - as during isotropic yielding, volumetric strain is distributed isotopically within the specimen. Isotropic volume change is especially important for CU testing, as cavitation of pore water sets the limit of undrained sand strength. Measurement precision is improved by taking measurements near the specimen. The load cell is submerged and in direct contact with the upped pressure head of the specimen. Deformation transducers are attached directly to the piston heads as well. Control of the apparatus is highly automated, thus cyclic loading can be applied with great efficiency and precision.

The combination of high automation, improved sample durability and large deformation compatibility expands the scope of triaxial testing. The Danish triaxial can yield CD and CU sand specimens into plasticity without forming a shear rupture or bulging. A sample can be tested for yielding multiple times in a single, continuous loading sequence. Samples can even be liquefied to a large strain amplitude, then crushed to CU failure. CU tests can be allowed to transition into CD state, and cyclic tested in CD mode to observe post liquefaction recovery of stiffness and strength. This allows to control the specimens to a very high degree, and observe sand response patterns which are not accessible using classical triaxial testing methods.

== Test standards ==
The list is not complete; only the main standards are included. For a more extensive listing, please refer to the websites of ASTM International (USA), British Standards (UK), International Organization for Standardization (ISO), or local organisations for standards.

- ASTM D7181-11: Standard Test Method for Consolidated Drained Triaxial Compression Test for Soils
- ASTM D4767-11 (2011): Standard Test Method for Consolidated Undrained Triaxial Compression Test for Cohesive Soils
- ASTM D2850-03a (2007): Standard Test Method for Unconsolidated-Undrained Triaxial Compression Test on Cohesive Soils
- BS 1377-8:1990 Part 8: Shear strength tests (effective stress)Triaxial Compression Test
- ISO/TS 17892-8:2004 Geotechnical investigation and testing—Laboratory testing of soil—Part 8: Unconsolidated undrained triaxial test
- ISO/TS 17892-9:2004 Geotechnical investigation and testing—Laboratory testing of soil—Part 9: Consolidated triaxial compression tests on water-saturated soils

== See also ==
- Civil engineering
- Direct shear test
- Earthworks (engineering)
- Effective stress
- Geotechnical engineering
- Shear strength (soil)
- Soil mechanics
