= Asperity (geotechnical engineering) =

In geotechnical engineering and contact mechanics the term asperity is used to refer to individual features of irregularity (roughness) of the surface of a discontinuity, grain, or particle with heights in the range from approximately 0.1 mm to the order of metres. Below the asperity level, surface interactions are normally considered to be a material property, arising from mechanisms of adhesion and repulsion at the atomic scale (often accounted for by material friction, atomic friction or molecular friction).

== Dilation ==
An often used definition for asperities in geotechnical engineering:
Unevenness of a surface are asperities if these cause dilation if two blocks with in between a discontinuity with matching asperities on the two opposing surfaces (i.e. a fitting discontinuity) move relative to each other, under low stress levels that do not cause breaking of the asperities.

== Contrast with asperity in materials science ==
Materials science recognizes asperities ranging from the sub-visual (normally less than 0.1 mm) to the atomic scale.

== See also ==
- Rock mechanics
- Soil mechanics
