= Izzat M. Idriss =

Syrian-American geotechnical engineer (1935-)

- Born: 1935; Qarah, Syria
- Education: Rensselaer Polytechnic Institute, California Institute of Technology, University of California, Berkeley
- Engineering career
- Discipline: geotechnical engineering, earthquake engineering
- Institutions: University of California, Davis
- Awards: H. Bolton Seed Medal, Ralph B. Peck Award, George W. Housner Medal,National Academy of Engineering

Izzat (Ed) M. Idriss (born 1935) is a Syrian-American geotechnical engineer. His research on the geotechnical aspects of earthquake engineering has led to the development of many of the currently used procedures for evaluating the behavior of soil sites and soil structures during earthquakes, such as methods for evaluating: the characteristics of earthquake ground motions; seismic response of sites; potential for soil liquefaction; performance of embankment dams during earthquakes; and soil-structure interaction in response to earthquake shaking.

== Early life and education ==
Idriss was born in Qarah, a small village in Syria. When he was two years old his family moved to Damascus until he was 16, at which time he moved to Beirut, Lebanon, to complete high school. In 1954 he moved to the United States to attend university.

He earned a BS in civil engineering from Rensselaer Polytechnic Institute in 1958; an MS in civil engineering from California Institute of Technology in 1959; and a PhD in civil engineering from University of California, Berkeley, in 1966 under the guidance of H. Bolton Seed.

== Career ==
In 1960 he joined Dames & Moore at their New York Office and worked there until 1962, when returned to California begin his PhD at UC Berkeley. After earning his PhD, he was a member of the teaching and research staff of the geotechnical engineering group at the University of California, Berkeley (1967-1975). He began his work with Woodward-Clyde Consultants in 1969 while still at UC Berkeley, and continued working in Woodward-Clyde's San Francisco, Santa Ana and Oakland offices until 1989. In 1989, he joined the Department of Civil and Environmental Engineering at University of California, Davis, where he was also Director of the Center for Geotechnical Modeling (CGM) (1989–1996). He retired from UC Davis in 2004.

== Learning From Earthquakes ==
Idriss has studied geotechnical data and damage impacts from damaging earthquakes to better understand the behavior of soils. He studied the L-Street slide in downtown Anchorage caused by the 1964 Alaska earthquake. He used boring logs and SPT low counts from the 1964 Niigata earthquake to illustrate the use of the Seed-Idriss simplified liquefaction procedure. A study of the 1967 Caracas earthquake evaluated the relationship between damage patterns and site conditions.

After the 1989 Loma Prieta earthquake Idriss was appointed to the eleven-member Governor's Board of Inquiry, chaired by George W. Housner, which was formed to study the significant damage to bridges and freeway structures and to make recommendations about how to prevent such damage in the future. Using strong motion records from soft soil sites, he analyzed site response at Treasure Island in San Francisco Bay, Foster City, and the San Francisco Airport.

== Professional Recognitions and Awards ==
- Thomas A. Middlebrooks Award (1971), along with co-authors H. Bolton Seed and Kenneth L. Lee
- Walter L. Huber Civil Engineering Research Prize from ASCE (1975)
- Norman Medal from ASCE (1977)
- Election to the U.S. National Academy of Engineering (1989) for "For major contributions to the understanding of soil behavior during earthquakes and for the application of these contributions in engineering practice."
- H. Bolton Seed Medal from the Geo-Institute of the American Society of Civil Engineers (1994)
- Distinguished Scholarly Public Service Award from the University of California, Davis (1999)
- Elected an honorary member of the Japanese Geotechnical Society (2005)
- Presented the 2nd Kenji Ishihara Lecture at the 4th International Conference on Geotechnical Earthquake Engineering, which was held in Thessaloniki, Greece in 2007
- Elected a Distinguished Member of ASCE (2008)
- Recipient of the 2010 Ralph B. Peck Award from the Geo-Institute of ASCE
- Presented the Casagrande Memorial Lecture (2010)
- Elected an Honorary Member of the Earthquake Engineering Research Institute (EERI) in 2012
- Presented the 2016 Nabor Carrillo Lecture. Selected by the Mexican Society for Geotechnical Engineering (Sociedad Mexicana de Ingeniería Geotécnica: SMIG)
- Recipient of the George W. Housner Medal from the Earthquake Engineering Research Institute (2018) "in recognition of extraordinary and lasting contributions to public safety through his research, teaching and practice in earthquake geotechnical engineering that led to major advancements in the understanding of site response, liquefaction and seismic performance of embankment dams, and his advising of public policymakers on prudent earthquake safety practices and policies over the course of many decades."
- Presented the 2019 Karl Terzaghi Lecture. Selected by the Geo-Institute of ASCE.
- Elected an honorary member of the International Association for Earthquake Engineering (IAEE) in 2024.
