= Harry Bolton Seed =

American academic (1922–1989)

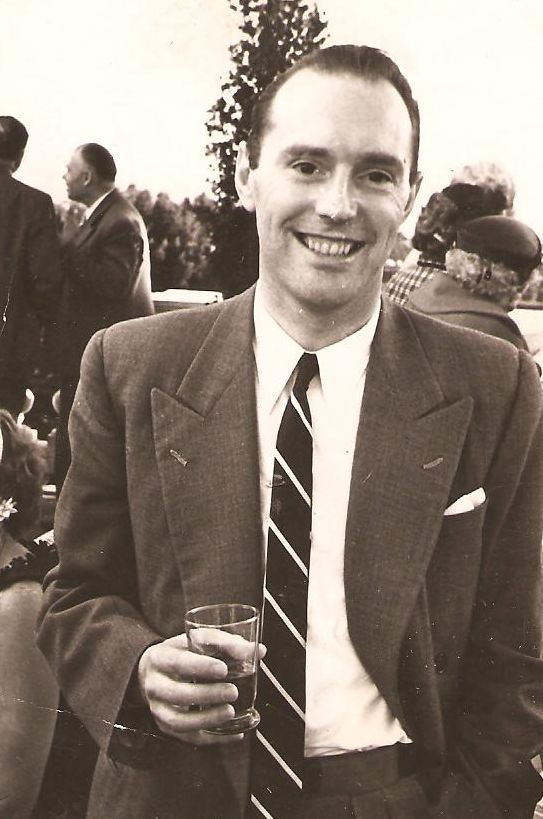
- Harry Bolton Seed at the UC Berkeley Faculty Club in 1969.
- Born: August 19, 1922; Bolton, England
- Died: April 23, 1989 (aged 66); Orinda, California, United States
- Education: King's College London
- Scientific career
- Fields: Civil Engineering
- Workplaces: University of California, Berkeley

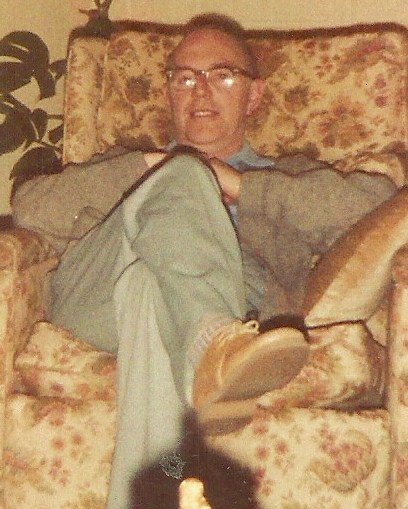
Harry Bolton Seed relaxing at home in 1987.

Harry Bolton Seed (August 19, 1922 – April 23, 1989) was an educator, scholar, former professor at the University of California, Berkeley. He was regarded as the founding father of geotechnical earthquake engineering.

== Biography ==
=== Early life ===
Harry Bolton Seed was born in Bolton, England, on August 19, 1922, into a family of a cotton mill manager. His father was Arthur Bolton Seed, and his mother's maiden name was Annie Wood; his sister Dorothy was nine years older than he was. He spent his childhood in Lancashire and attended Farnworth Grammar School, where he exhibited talent both at sports and academics. At the age of eighteen he chose a scholarship to King's College London over a possible professional soccer career. Seed's studies were interrupted by the Second World War, when he served the military as a lieutenant. After military service, Seed returned to the University of London to finish his study, and received a BSc in Civil Engineering in 1944 and a PhD in Structural Engineering in 1947. His thesis title was "Non-elastic deformations in concrete and their effects on design". Seed also captained the University of London's soccer team, and the All-England team during this period. Following two years as assistant lecturer at King's College, Seed came to Harvard University to study soil mechanics under the tutelage of engineering giants Karl Terzaghi and Arthur Casagrande. He received his S.M. degree from Harvard in 1948 and spent the next year as an instructor at Harvard, followed by a year as a foundation engineer for Thomas Worcester, Inc., in Boston.

=== Career at the University of California, Berkeley ===
In 1950 Seed joined the civil engineering faculty at the University of California, Berkeley, where he finished his career as an educator, researcher and consultant to public agencies and private businesses. He built up the geotechnical engineering program at Berkeley into one of the best in the world. He served as chair of the Civil Engineering Department from 1965 to 1971. He successfully guided fifty PhD degree candidates to complete their dissertations during his career. He died of cancer at his home in Orinda, California on April 23, 1989.

=== Father of geotechnical earthquake engineering ===
Professor Seed's published nearly 300 papers and reports on various topics on Geotechnical Engineering. His early research on pile-soil interaction, soil compaction and pavement formed the scientific basis for modern design. In the 1960s he established a new research area, geotechnical earthquake engineering, and he is commonly regarded as the founding father of this area. His pioneering works included the development of equivalent linear method (SHAKE) for seismic site response analysis, soil structure interaction analysis, evaluation and mitigation of soil liquefaction, etc. He investigated many major disasters, such as the 1964 Great Alaska earthquake, the 1971 San Fernando earthquake in California, the 1976 failure of the Teton Dam, the 1979 slide at the port of Nice in France, and the 1985 Mexico City earthquake. He served as a consultant on hundreds of projects all over the world, including more than 100 major dams, more than 20 nuclear power plants, and innumerable major buildings and transportation facilities. His research, founded on sound scientific principles, have led to a total revision of concepts and methods for geotechnical earthquake design, as well as revision of codes of practice, design procedures, and regulations throughout the world.

== Honors and awards ==
Seed received numerous awards and honors during his career. He was elected to the National Academy of Engineering in 1970 and National Academy of Sciences in 1986. He received the National Medal of Science, the nation's highest scientific honor, from President Reagan in 1987. The American Society of Civil Engineers accorded him more awards than any other engineer in the history of the society, including two Norman Medals, three James J. R. Croes Medals, four Thomas A. Middlebrooks Awards, and Thomas Fitch Rowland Prize, Wellington Prize, Walter A. Huber Research Prize, the Karl Terzaghi Award. He was elected honorary member in the American Society of Civil Engineers in 1985, honorary member in the Earthquake Engineering Research Institute in 1988. He was awarded the Distinguished Teaching Award and Faculty Research Lecturer from the University of California. He was the Karl von Terzaghi Lecturer in 1967 and gave the Rankine Lecture in 1979. In 1993, American Society of Civil Engineers established H. Bolton Seed Medal in his honor.
