= Gholamreza Mesri =

- Born: April 15, 1940; Tabriz Iran
- Occupation: Geotechnical engineer
- Spouse: Lorna Claire Crawford
- Awards: Karl Terzaghi Award (2014); Norman Medal (1988 and 2004); Thomas A. Middlebrooks Award (1992)

Gholamreza Mesri is a geotechnical engineering researcher, professor, and consultant. He currently lectures at the University of Illinois at Urbana–Champaign.

Mesri emigrated from Iran to the United States in 1960. He attended the University of Illinois at Urbana–Champaign where he earned his B.S. (1965) M.S. (1966) and PhD. (1969), all in civil engineering. His research areas include consolidation and construction methods. He has worked extensively in Mexico City both on the Mexico City Metropolitan Cathedral and the new airport. He has also investigated the causes of the settlement of Kansai International Airport

== Books ==
- Terzaghi, K., Peck, R. B. and Mesri, G., Soil Mechanics in Engineering Practice, 3rd Ed. Wiley-Interscience (1996) ISBN 0-471-08658-4.
