= T. William Lambe =

American geotechnical engineer and academic

Thomas William Lambe (November 28, 1920 in Raleigh, North Carolina – March 6, 2017 in Sarasota, Florida) was an American geotechnical engineer and an emeritus professor at the Massachusetts Institute of Technology.

Lambe studied civil engineering at North Carolina State, receiving his bachelor's degree in 1942. He studied at MIT starting in 1943, working with Donald Wood Taylor in 1948. He assisted Karl von Terzaghi and Taylor in their work as consultants. He was Professor of Civil Engineering until his retirement in 1981, when he was the head of the Geotechnical Engineering Department and the director of the Soil Stabilization Laboratory. He also worked as a consulting engineer.

Lambe was also involved in the Apollo Program for which he designed the soil experiments. He is an Honorary Member of the American Society of Civil Engineers (ASCE) and the Institution of Civil Engineers. He received the Norman Medal of the ASCE in 1964, the Terzaghi Award in 1975. He was the Terzaghi Lecturer in 1970, and the Rankine Lecturer in 1973. In 1997 he gave the Spencer J. Buchanan Lecture at the Texas A&M University.
