= Terzaghi =

Terzaghi is a surname. Notable people with the surname include:

- Emiliano Terzaghi (born 1993), Argentine footballer
- Mario Terzaghi (1915–1998), Italian architect and designer
- Ruth Doggett Terzaghi (1903–1992), American geologist and civil engineer
