= Elisabeth Pate-Cornell =

American engineer

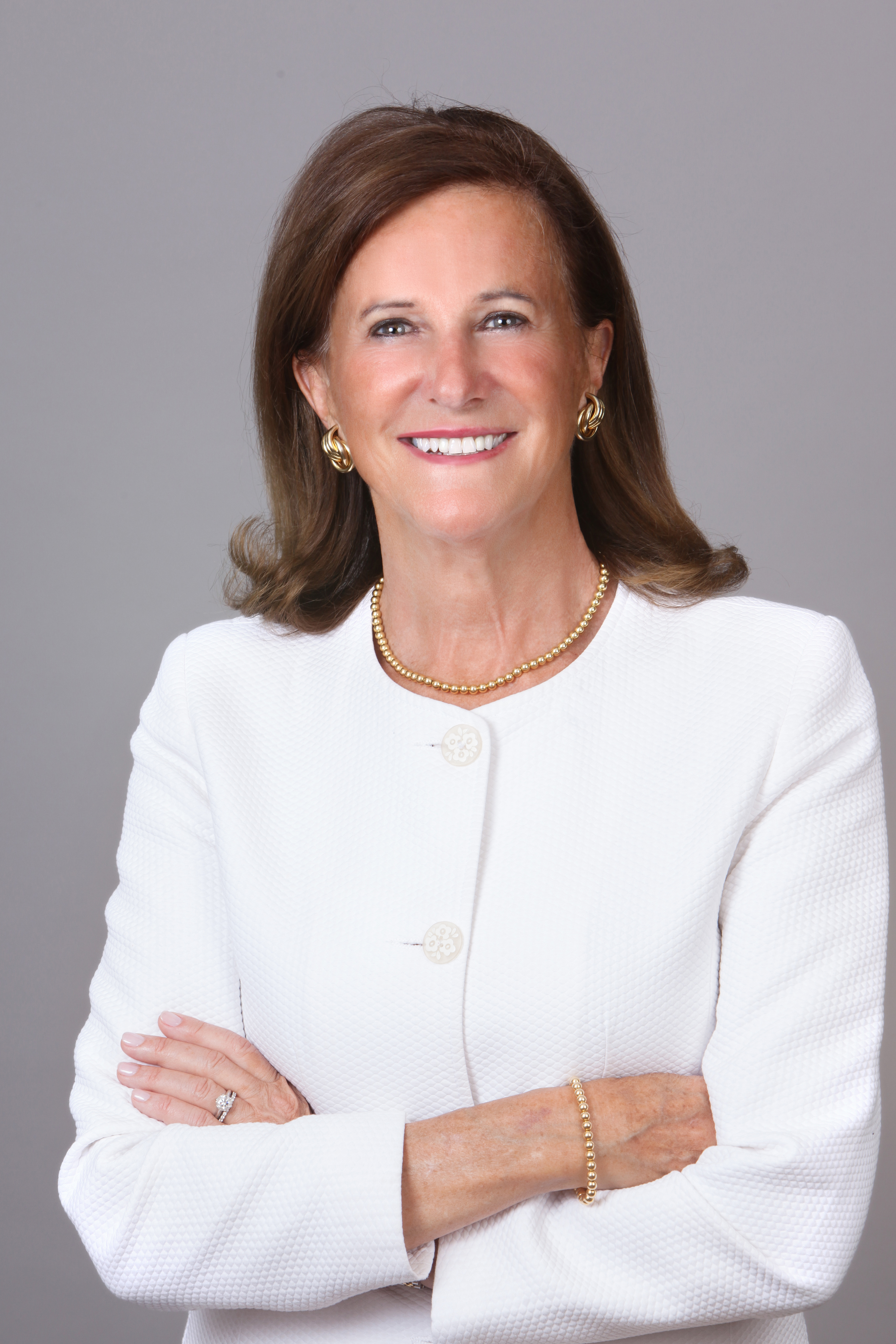
- Born: Marie-Elisabeth Lucienne Paté-Cornell; 1948 (age 77–78); Dakar, Senegal
- Education: Aix-Marseille University; Grenoble Institute of Technology; Stanford University
- Spouse(s): Late C. Allin Cornell; Admiral James O. Ellis (USN ret.)
- Scientific career
- Fields: Risk Analysis
- Workplaces: Stanford University

Marie-Elisabeth Lucienne Paté-Cornell, (born in 1948), is a Stanford University Professor in the Department of Management Science and Engineering and was the Founding Chair of the Department.

Pate-Cornell is an expert in engineering risk analysis and management and, more generally, the use of Bayesian probability to process incomplete information. Her research and that of her Engineering Risk Research Group have focused on the inclusion of technical and management factors in probabilistic risk analysis models with applications to the NASA shuttle tiles, offshore oil platforms and medical systems. Since 2001, she has combined risk analysis and game analysis to assess intelligence information and risks of terrorist attacks.

== Biography ==
Pate-Cornell, born in Dakar, Senegal, earned her Bachelor's degree in mathematics and physics from Aix-Marseille University in 1968, and her Master's and Engineering degrees in applied mathematics and computer science from the Institut Polytechnique de Grenoble, (France, 1970;1971), a Master's degree in Operations Research from Stanford in 1972 and a Ph.D. in Engineering-Economic Systems, also from Stanford, in 1978.

Career

Pate-Cornell held her first position as an Assistant Professor of Civil Engineering at MIT, and then Professor in the Stanford Department of Industrial Engineering and Department of Management Science and Engineering, from 1991 on. She was the Chair of the department from 1997 to 2011. In 1999, she was named Burt and Deedee McMurtry Professor in the Stanford School of Engineering. She is also a senior fellow of the Stanford Institute for International Studies.

Honors and awards

- Best-paper Award for the year, Military Operations Research Journal (2003)
- Fellows Award, Institute for Operations Research and the Management Sciences (INFORMS) (2002)
- Distinguished Achievement Award, Society for Risk Analysis (2002)
- Award for Meritorious Civilian Service, U.S. Air Force (2002)
- Teaching Award for graduate teaching at the doctoral level, Stanford Department of Management Science and Engineering (June 2002)
- Best paper of the year, IEEE Engineering Management Society (EMS) (2001)
- Member, National Academy of Engineering (1995)
- Council member, National Academy of Engineering (2001)
- President, Society for Risk Analysis (1995-1996)
- Fellow, Society for Risk Analysis (1995)
- Conseiller, (advisor), French Academy of Engineering (2001)
- Member, French Academy of Engineering (2003)
- Chair, Decision Analysis Society of the Institute for Operations Research and the Management Sciences (2002–03)
- Decision Analysis Publication Award for the year, Decision Analysis Society of the Institute for Operations Research and the Management Sciences (1994)
- Stanford Fellow, NASA-ASEE (1994)
- Finalist-Edelman Management Award, The Institute for Management Science (May 1993)
- Best Paper Award, American Nuclear Society (June 1990)
- Visiting Professor, Ecole Normale Supérieure, Cachan, France (March 1996)
- Visiting Scholar, Electric Power Research Institute, Palo Alto, CA (January–March, 1995)
- Visiting Scholar, International Institute for Applied Systems Analysis (IIASA), Laxenburg, Austria (July–August 1979)

Boards, advisory committees, professional organisations

- She was elected in 1995 to the National Academy of Engineering to its Council (2001-2007), and to the French Académie des Technologies (2003).
- Paté-Cornell was a member of the Board of Trustees of InQtel. and of Draper Laboratory.
- Member of the President's Foreign Intelligence Advisory Board (December 2001 to 2008)

Personal Life

She and the late Professor C. Allin Cornell have two children Philip (1981) and Ariane (1984). She is currently married to Admiral James O. Ellis (USN ret.).

== Publications ==
- Public policy in earthquake effects mitigation : earthquake engineering and earthquake prediction, 1978
- Risk and public policy, 1979
- Risk-benefit analysis for construction of new dams : sensitivity study and real case applications, 1981
- Consistency of safety standards across the different economic sectors, 1981
- Bayesian updating of the probability of nuclear attack, 1990
- Assessment and management of the risks of debris hits during space station EVAs, 1997
- Industrial engineering, 1998
- Perspectives on complex global challenges : education, energy, healthcare, security and resilience, 2016
