= Bruce R. Ellingwood =

American civil engineer and educator (born 1944)

Bruce Russell Ellingwood
- Education: University of Illinois at Urbana-Champaign
- Scientific career
- Fields: Civil Engineering
- Workplaces: Colorado State University; Georgia Institute of Technology; Johns Hopkins University
- Doctoral advisor: Alfredo H.-S. Ang

Bruce Russell Ellingwood (born October 11, 1944) is an American civil engineer and a Professor of Civil and Environmental Engineering at the Colorado State University.

He became a member of the National Academy of Engineering in 2001 for leadership in the use of probability and statistics in the design of structures and in the development of new design criteria. And, he is a two-time recipient of the Norman Medal, the highest honor granted by the American Society of Civil Engineers for a technical paper judged worthy of special commendation for its merit as a contribution to the Engineering Science. Ellingwood also received the Walter P. Moore Jr. Award by the ASCE.

He is a pioneer in the field of structural reliability.

== Biography ==
=== Education ===
Ellingwood received his B.S., M.S., and Ph.D. degrees in Civil Engineering from the University of Illinois at Urbana-Champaign in 1968, 1969, and 1972, respectively. His doctoral thesis was supervised by Alfredo H-S. Ang.

=== Career ===
After receiving his Ph.D. in 1972, Ellingwood joined the Naval Ship Research and Development Center as a Research Structural Engineer. In 1975, he moved to the Center for Building Technology at the National Bureau of Standards (now the National Institute of Standards and Technology), and later became the leader of the Structural Engineering Group for the Center for Building Technology. In 1986, Ellingwood joined the faculty of Johns Hopkins University, and in 1990, became the Willard and Lillian Hackerman Chair in Civil Engineering. He joined the faculty of Georgia Institute of Technology in 2000 as Chair of the School of Civil and Environmental Engineering, and held that position from 2000 to 2002. Subsequently, he served as College of Engineering Distinguished Professor at Georgia Tech, where he also held the Raymond Allen Jones Chair in Civil Engineering.

Bruce Ellingwood is currently Professor Civil Engineering at the Colorado State University at Fort Collins, CO.

== Honors ==
- Nathan M. Newmark Medal, American Society of Civil Engineers, 2006
- Lifetime Achievement Award, American Institute of Steel Construction, 2006
- Charles E. Schmidt Distinguished Visiting Professor, Florida Atlantic University, 2005
- Distinguished Alumnus Award, Civil and Environmental Engineering Alumni Association, University of Illinois at Urbana-Champaign, 2002
- National Academy of Engineering, 2001
- Walter P. Moore Jr. Award, American Society of Civil Engineers, 1999
- Norman Medal, American Society of Civil Engineers, 1983 and 1998
- T. R. Higgins Lectureship Award, American Institute of Steel Construction, 1988
- L. J. Markwardt Research Prize, Forest Products Research Society, 1988
- Moisseiff Award, American Society of Civil Engineers, 1988
- State of the Art of Civil Engineering Award, ASCE, 1983 and 1988
- Engineer of the Year of the U.S. Department of Commerce, NSPE, 1986
- Engineering Achievement Award, D.C. Joint Council of Engrg. and Arch. Societies, 1980
- U.S. Department of Commerce Silver Medal, 1980
- Walter L. Huber Engineering Research Prize, American Society of Civil Engineers, 1980

== See also ==
- Structural engineering
