= Steve Kramer (engineer) =

American engineer

- Born: Steven Lawrence Kramer
- Education: University of California, Berkeley
- Scientific career
- Fields: Geotechnical engineering Earthquake Engineering
- Workplaces: University of Washington

Steven Lawrence Kramer is Professor Emeritus of Geotechnical Engineering at the University of Washington.

== Education ==
Steve Kramer received his B.S. (1977), M.Eng. (1979), and Ph.D. (1985) in Civil Engineering from the University of California, Berkeley.

== Professional career ==
Kramer joined the University of Washington faculty in 1984, where he researched liquefaction, seismic slope stability and dynamic soil behavior. Kramer also held positions at the International Centre for Geohazards at the Norwegian Geotechnical Institute and the European School for Advanced Studies in the Reduction of Seismic Risk (the ROSE School) at the University of Pavia. He retired in 2020.

He authored the first textbook on Geotechnical Earthquake Engineering and co-led the multi-institution Next Generation Liquefaction project, sponsored by the U.S. Nuclear Regulatory Commission, the U.S. Bureau of Reclamation, several transportation agencies, and others.

Kramer has contributed technical consulting to a range of infrastructure projects, such as the Alaskan Way Viaduct replacement in Seattle and the Millennium Tower (San Francisco) mediation.

Kramer was elected a member of the National Academy of Engineering in 2020, for contributions to geotechnical earthquake engineering, including liquefaction, seismic stability, and seismic site response.

== Awards ==
- Walter L. Huber Civil Engineering Research Prize, 1996
- ASCE Norman Medal, 2009 and 2017
- ASCE H. Bolton Seed Medal, 2018
- Academy of Distinguished Alumni, Civil Engineering, University of California Berkeley, 2020
- National Academy of Engineering, 2020
