= Aquarium du Québec =

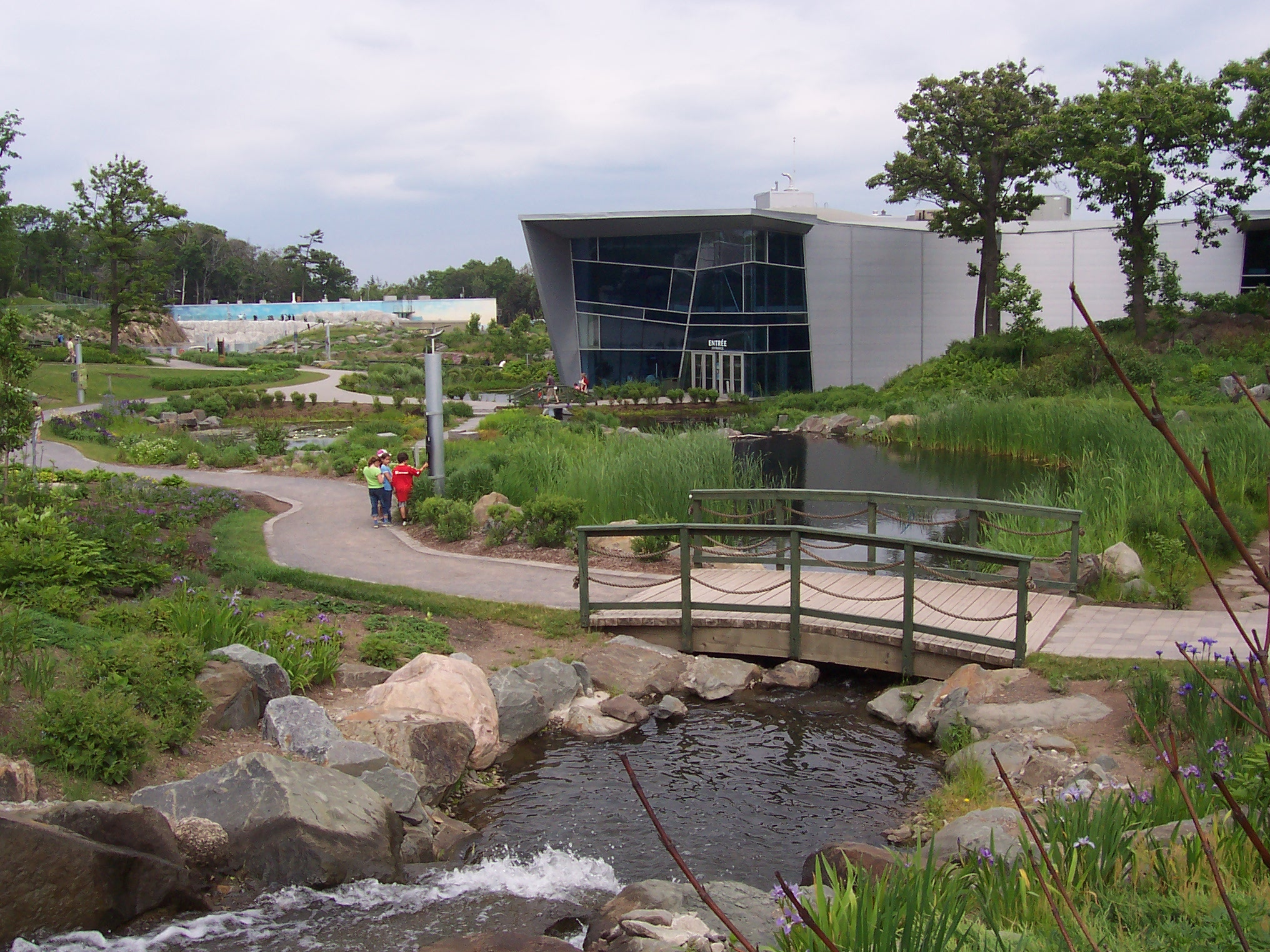
- The main building, the stream and part of the garden.
- Interactive map of Aquarium du Québec
- 46.7508°N 71.2884°W
- Date opened: 1959
- Location: 1675, avenue des Hôtels; Quebec City, Quebec; G1W 4S3
- Land area: 16 hectares (40 acres)
- No. of animals: 10,000
- No. of species: 300
- Volume of largest tank: 350,000 litres (92,000 US gal)
- Memberships: CAZA
- Website: www.sepaq.com/ct/paq/

Aquarium du Québec (English: Aquarium of Quebec) is a public aquarium located in the former city of Sainte-Foy in Quebec City, Quebec, Canada. The 16-hectare (40-acre) facility is home to more than 10,000 animals representing more than 300 species. It is operated by Société des établissements de plein air du Québec (Sépaq), and is a member of the Canadian Association of Zoos and Aquariums (CAZA) and the Association of Zoos and Aquariums (AZA).

== History ==
The origin of the Aquarium du Québec dates back to 1953, when ichthyologist Dr. Vadim D. Vladykov convinced Dr. Arthur Labrie, Deputy Minister of Ministry of Fisheries, to obtain a site near the Quebec Bridge that belonged to the Canadian National Railway. The provincial government acquired the land in 1954, and work to construct the buildings began in 1955.

In 1956, the Biological Centre of Quebec opened, and included laboratories occupied by research teams in marine biology and fisheries, a rotunda, and two series of aquariums. Soon, a research wing was added to house laboratories for research on species with commercial potential, such as salmon, eel, and lobster, and to gather all documents in the library of the Ministry of Fisheries. 230,000 gallons of freshwater were supplied by tanker from Lake Saint-Charles and drawn directly from the St. Lawrence River. The 320,000 gallons of saltwater were brought in from as far away as Rimouski (Pointe-au-Père).

In 1959, after the completion of reception areas and a restaurant, the aquarium opened to the public as the Organic Centre. The Organic Centre's educational mission was provided in collaboration with the Linnean Society of Quebec that establishes a program for children, a first for a museum in Quebec. The 150,000 visitors that were welcomed in the first year caused additional investment for the site that included outdoor pools for seals additional aquariums.

In 1971, researchers at the Biological Centre eventually moved to the new Science Complex of Quebec. To reflect the fact that the aquarium had evolved into a public education facility (although research work in collaboration with universities continues), it changed its name to the Aquarium du Québec.

In 1999, the aquarium welcomed its eight-millionth visitor. However, the facilities had become antiquated, and the Quebec government (the owners) did not want to continue funding a facility that did not pay for itself. The Sépaq was created, with the mandate to manage and renovate the Aquarium, along with the Jardin Zoologique du Québec (Zoological Gardens of Quebec).

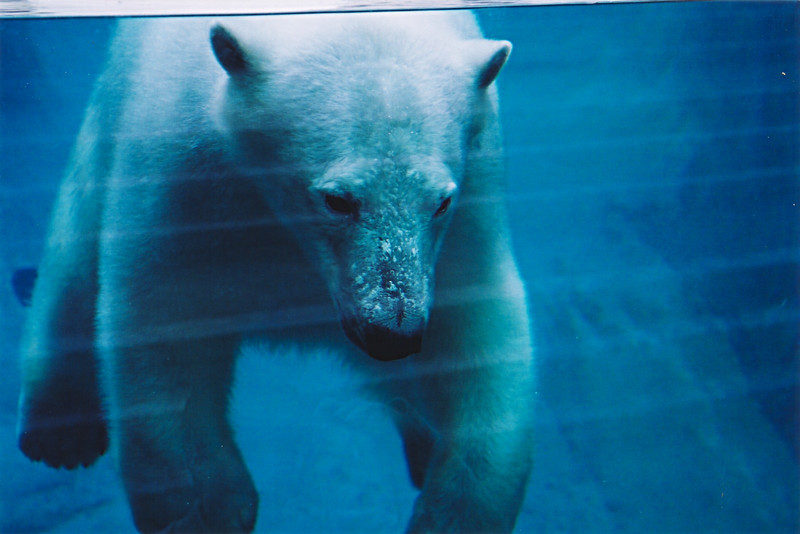
Underwater view of a polar bear

In 2002, after two years of closure for renovation, the newly named le nouveau Parc Aquarium du Québec opened its doors next to the zoo. The main building, outdoor gardens, and seal pools were completely refurbished. Most of their international species replaced by aquatic species from Quebec. A polar bear exhibit with an underwater viewing pool was added, though the Aquarium was accused of having a design "off" from the definition of marine life, and of copying another popular attraction, the Zoo Sauvage de St-Félicien. The aquarium did not meet its ambitious attendance targets initially and it reduced its entry price and offered children of Quebec residents free admission until 2006.

In 2005, Michel Després, the provincial minister responsible for the Quebec region announced that the Jardin Zoologique du Québec would close, some activities at the Aquarium would be stopped, and management would be turned over to the Société des établissements de plein air du Québec (Sépaq). The government of Quebec would invest $6.5 million at the aquarium to expand its collection.

In November 2008, the institution changed its name back to Aquarium du Québec and unveiled a new logo.

In September of 2026, the aquarium was accredited by the Association of Zoos and Aquariums after participating in the Pathway to Membership program.

== Attractions ==
The Aquarium has a garden, several outdoor pools, and a main building with several exhibits. The Aquarium it also has an annual Light Festival (Festi Lumière) where they display more than 50,000 LED lights in a Holiday motif.

The Aquarium has around 300 species of fish, crustaceans, molluscs, reptiles, amphibians, birds, and marine mammals in their exhibits housing around 10,000 animals. The Aquarium specializes in boreal and arctic wildlife.

The Aquarium du Québec has seven individual exhibits sectors. Each sector is representative of the wildlife and nature found in a specific geographical region. The sectors are:

=== Indoors ===
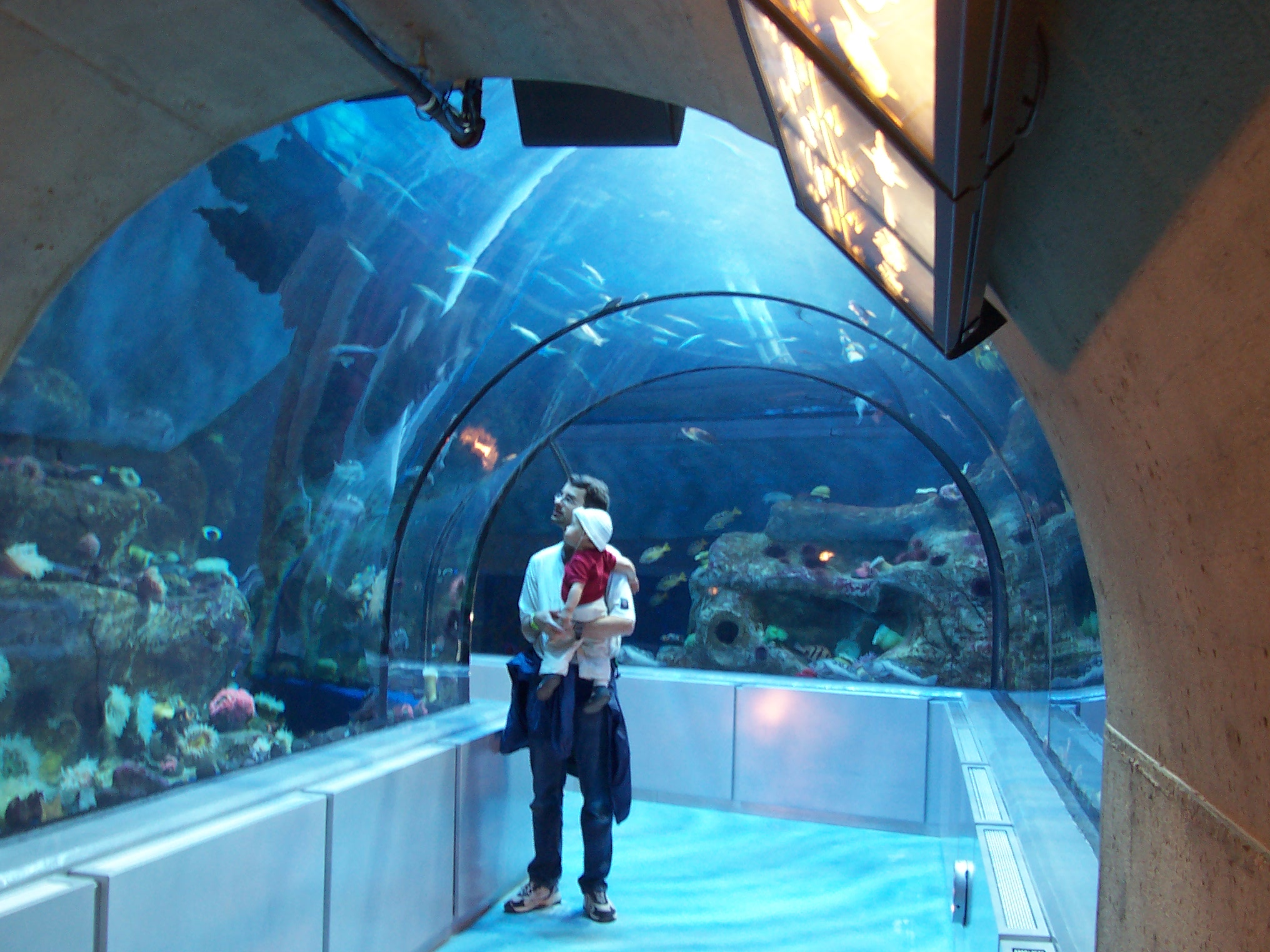
Awesome Ocean

The Awesome Ocean

The Awesome Ocean exhibit is the main attraction in the aquarium. Visitors walk through a tunnel in a 350,000-litre (92,000 US gal) sea water tank and see the marine life from the vantage point of a diver. There are often divers in the exhibit that will showcase the marine life.

Discover the Coastal Zone

This sector showcases the world of Canada's marine invertebrates from both the Atlantic and the Pacific Ocean. Visitors are also given the opportunity to interact and even touch the animals such as starfish, sea urchins, hermit crabs, sea cucumbers, and more.

Fresh & Salt Water

Two levels of aquariums exhibit the estuarine life in the St. Lawrence basin where the fresh water from the river mixes with the salt water of the Atlantic Ocean.

Scientific Crossroads

Discover the research that makes the Aquarium du Québec an important place for marine biology in Canada and learn more about marine labs and marine research.

=== Outdoors ===
Wetlands

An exhibition that showcases the ecosystem of the St. Lawrence corridor that includes many birds, amphibians, insects, reptiles, and plants that inhabit the surrounding environment.

Banks of the St. Lawrence River

While visitors overlook the mighty St. Lawrence River, they can observe the grey and harbour seals as they frolic and play amongst the waves.

The Arctic Sector

Visitors can observe animals that exist in the Arctic, such as Harp seals, and polar bears as they move through the four different seasons with an underwater glass view.
