= John Ripley Freeman =

American civil and hydraulic engineer

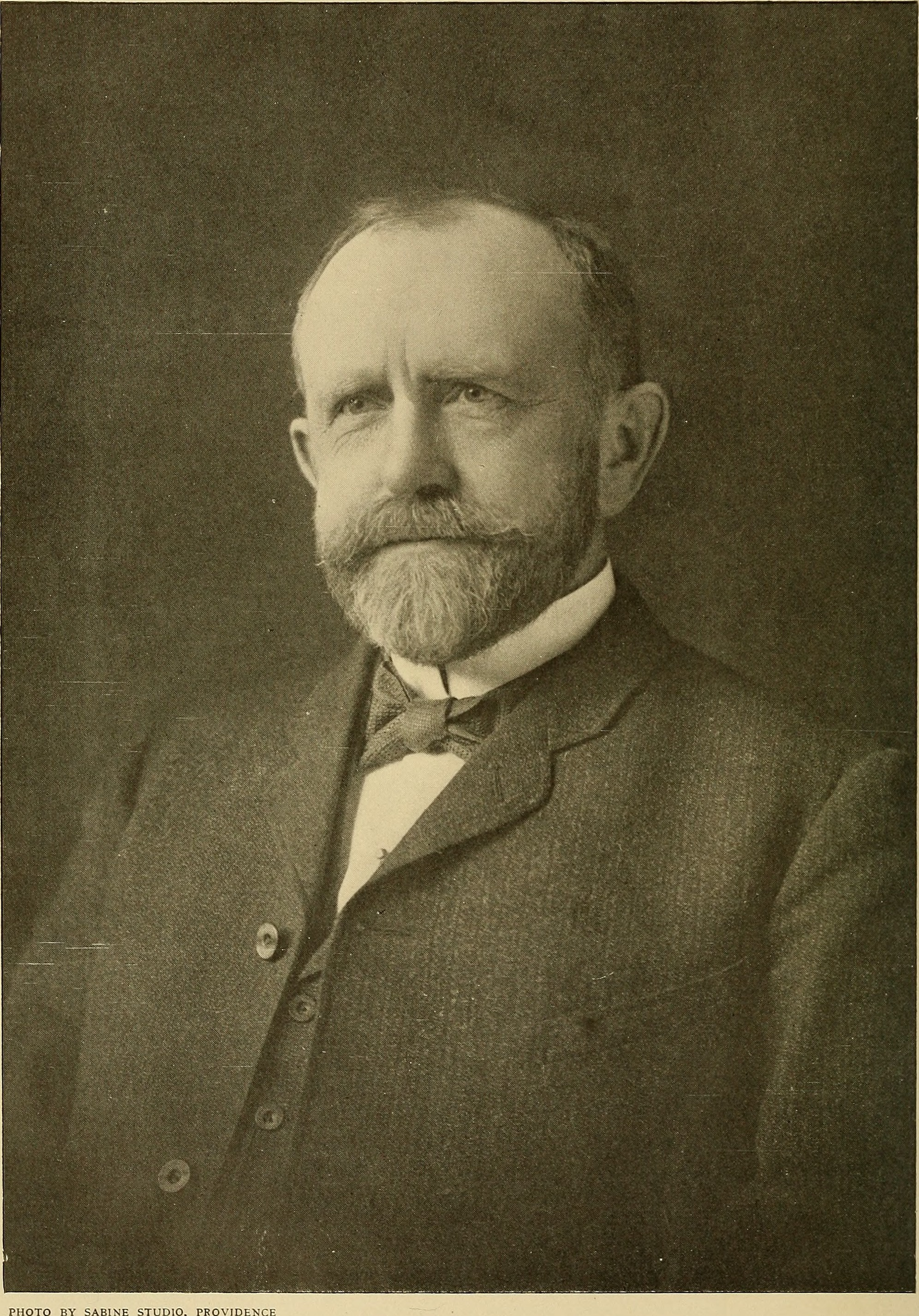
- Born: July 27, 1855; West Bridgton, Maine
- Died: October 6, 1932 (aged 77); Providence, Rhode Island
- Citizenship: American
- Education: Massachusetts Institute of Technology
- Spouse: Elizabeth Farwell née Clark
- Awards: John Fritz Medal (1934) Posthumous; J. James R. Croes Medal (1931); ASME Medal (1923); Norman Medal (1890, 1891)
- Scientific career
- Fields: Fire protection engineering; Civil engineering; Hydraulic engineering; Aeronautics
- Workplaces: National Academy of Sciences; National Advisory Committee for Aeronautics; National Research Council; National Bureau of Standards

Chairman of the NACA
- In office 1918–1919
- President: Woodrow Wilson
- Preceded by: William F. Durand
- Succeeded by: Charles Doolittle Walcott

John Ripley Freeman (July 27, 1855 – October 6, 1932) was an American civil and hydraulic engineer. He is known for the design of several waterworks and served as president of both the American Society of Civil Engineers and the American Society of Mechanical Engineers.

== Biography ==
Freeman was born in West Bridgton, Maine on his father's farm. He attended the country school in his hometown and public schools in Portland, Maine and Lawrence, Massachusetts. He entered the Massachusetts Institute of Technology in 1872, graduating with his BSc in civil engineering in 1876.

After graduating, Freeman started his career at the Essex water power company as assistant to the company's engineer, Hiram F. Mills. In those days he became acquainted with other leading engineers such as Charles Storer Storrow, James B. Francis, Joseph R. Davis and John C. Hoadley. In 1886, he moved to Boston, where he was appointed engineer and inspector at the Associated Mutual Fire Insurance Company. In the next decades Freeman was the design engineer for several water projects, served on several water works commissions, and was consulting engineer for many projects.

Freeman served as president of the American Society of Civil Engineers and of the American Society of Mechanical Engineers. He was also the founder and president of Massachusetts Mutual Fire Insurance Company. He was a member of the National Advisory Committee for Aeronautics during World War I, and served as chairman from 1918 to 1919.

Freeman received numerous honorary degrees. He received Doctor of Science degrees from Brown University in 1904; from Tufts College in 1905; from the Sachsischen Technischen Hochschule in Dresden, Germany, in June 1925; from the University of Pennsylvania in 1927; and from Yale University in 1931. in 1922 he was awarded the ASME Medal.

In the late 1920s Freeman established fellowships to send promising students and professors to cutting edge hydraulic labs with a focus on exposing them to practices he believed would be useful in solving river problems. One of these professors was Blake R. Van Leer who invented the California pipe method for measuring water while working for the Southern Pacific Railroad Company. Van Leer later became the president at Georgia Institute of Technology.

Freeman was elected Honorary Member of Phi Beta Kappa at Brown University in 1901; Member of the National Academy of Sciences in 1918; Honorary Member of the Marsaryk Academy of Works in Czechoslovakia in 1926; Ehrenbürger (Honorary Member) der Badischen Technischen Hochschule in Karlsruhe, Germany, in January 1929; Mitglied des Wissenschaftlichen Beirats des Forschungs-Institutes in München und Walchcnsee, Bavaria, Germany in January 1931; and Fellow of the American Academy of Arts and Sciences. In 1932, the American Society of Mechanical Engineers elected Freeman an honorary member.

He died in Rhode Island in 1932 of complications from a stroke at age 77.

== Work ==
Freeman is noted for his work designing and building the Charles River Dam in Boston, advising the US government on dam and lock foundations for the Panama Canal, and influencing the design of MIT's new campus in Cambridge, Massachusetts.

Freeman was the design engineer for the Lake Spaulding Dam, the Holter Dam, the Hetch Hetchy Aqueduct, the Charles River Dam, the Keokuk Dam, the Los Angeles Aqueduct, and portions of the Panama Canal.

== Publications, a selection ==
- John Freeman, Regulation of elevation and discharge of the great lakes, 1926
- John Freeman, Earthquake damage and earthquake insurance, 1932
- John Freeman, Experiments relating to hydraulics of fire streams The nozzle as an accurate water meter.
- John Freeman, Fire-stream tables.
- John Freeman, Flow of water in pipes.
- John Freeman, Hydraulic laboratory practice : comprising a translation, revised to 1929, of Die Wasserbaulaboratorien Europas, published in 1926 by Verein Deutscher Ingenieure; including also descriptions of other European and American laboratories and notes on the theory of experiments with models
- John Freeman, Lock canal at Panama ...
- John Freeman, On contemporary technical education; address of John R. Freeman on behalf of the engineering societies at the inauguration of President Charles S. Howe, Case School of Applied Science.
- John Freeman, On the safeguarding of life in theaters; being a study from the standpoint of an engineer.
- Freeman, John R. (1912). On the proposed use of a portion of the Hetch Hetchy, Eleanor and Cherry Valleys, within and near to the boundaries of the Stanislaus U.S. national forest reserve and the Yosemite National Park, as reservoirs for impounding Tuolumne River flood waters and appurtenant works for the water supply of San Francisco, California, and neighboring cities: a report to James Rolph, Jr., Mayor of San Francisco, and Percy V. Long, City Attorney. San Francisco: Rincon Publishing Company. LCCN 12026935. OL 22996228M.
