= C. Allin Cornell =

American engineer (1938–2007)

- Born: 19 September 1938; Mobridge, South Dakota, U.S.
- Died: 14 December 2007 (aged 69); Stanford University Medical Center
- Education: Stanford University
- Known for: Probabilistic Seismic Hazard Analysis
- Spouse: Elisabeth Pate-Cornell (m. 1981)
- Children: 5, including Eric Allin
- Awards: Norman Medal (1983, 2003); CERRA Award (1987); Harry Fielding Reid Medal (2001); George W. Housner Medal (2003); William B. Joyner Memorial Lecture (2005)
- Scientific career
- Workplaces: Stanford University; MIT
- Doctoral advisor: Jack Benjamin

Carl Allin Cornell (September 19, 1938 – December 14, 2007) was an American civil engineer, researcher, and professor who made important contributions to reliability theory and earthquake engineering and, along with Luis Esteva, developed the field of probabilistic seismic hazard analysis by publishing the seminal document of the field in 1968.

== Biography ==
Cornell was born in Mobridge, South Dakota in 1938. He received his B.A. in architecture in 1960 and M.S. and Ph.D. in civil engineering in 1961 and 1964 respectively, all from Stanford University. He held a professorship at the Massachusetts Institute of Technology from 1964 to 1983, and in 1983 became a research professor at Stanford.

He was awarded the Moisseiff Award (1977), two Norman Medals (1983 and 2003), and the Freudenthal Medal (1988), all from the American Society of Civil Engineers (ASCE). He also received the Harry Fielding Reid Medal of the Seismological Society of America, their highest honor (2001) and their William B. Joyner Memorial Lecture award (2005), as well as the Earthquake Engineering Research Institute's highest honor, the Housner Medal, in 2003. He was a fellow of the American Geophysical Union (2002) and member of the National Academy of Engineering (1981). His wife was Elisabeth Pate-Cornell, formerly chair of Stanford's Department of Management Science and Engineering, and one of his five children is Eric Allin Cornell, Nobel Laureate in Physics.

He is best known for his 1968 seminal paper "Engineering Seismic Risk Analysis" that started the field of probabilistic seismic hazard analysis; his work in reliability especially on second moment methods and reliability-based code calibration, and his development of the probabilistic framework for performance-based earthquake engineering that became the unifying equation of the Pacific Earthquake Engineering Research Center. His 1971 book, Probability, Statistics, and Decision for Civil Engineers (coauthored with Jack Benjamin), exposed an entire generation of civil and structural engineering students to the field of probabilistic modeling and decision analysis, and remains in use for classroom curriculum to this day.

At the quadrennial International Conference on Applications of Statistics and Probability in Civil Engineering, the International Civil Engineering Risk and Reliability Association (CERRA) awards the C. Allin Cornell Award to one individual. In 2009, the award was renamed from the CERRA Award to the C. Allin Cornell Award in honor of its first recipient, and was awarded under its new name in 2011. Cornell received the award in 1987.

He died aged 69 at Stanford University Medical Center he had been struggling with cancer for two years.

== Students ==
Jack Baker (Ph.D.)	Hugh Banon (M.Sc.)	Paolo Bazzurro (Ph.D.)	Jorge Carballo (Ph.D.)
Peter Chu-Chuan Tsai (Ph.D.)	Ross Corotis (Ph.D.)	Rabi De (Ph.D.)	Mike Fardis (M.Sc.)
LeRoy Fitzwater (Ph.D.)	Mircea Grigoriu (Ph.D.)	Yves Guenard (Ph.D.)	Ron Harichandran (M.Sc.)
Shou Nien Hou (Ph.D.)	Yaacob Ibrahim (Ph.D.)	Iunio Iervolino (M.Sc.)	Takashi Inoue (M.Sc.)
Fatemeh Jalayer (Ph.D.)	Ashish Karamchandani (Ph.D.)	Bob Kilcup (Ph.D.)	Rich Larrabee (Ph.D.)
Nicolas Luco (Ph.D.)	Lance Manuel (Ph.D.)	Yuji Nakamura (M.Sc.)	Robin McGuire (Ph.D.)
Hanz Merz (M.Sc.)	Jong Peir (Ph.D.)	Douglas Schmucker (Ph.D.)	Robert Sewell (Ph.D.)
Nilesh Shome (Ph.D.)	Keto Soosaar (Ph.D.)	Gabriel Toro (Ph.D.)	Polsak Tothong (Ph.D.)
Dimitrios Vamvatsikos (Ph.D.)	Erik Vanmarcke (Ph.D.)	Daniele Veneziano (Ph.D.)	Steve Winterstein (Ph.D)
Shen-Chyun Wu (Ph.D.)	Gee Liek Yeo (Ph.D.)	Alejandro Barrios (M.Sc)	John A (Bert) Sweetman (PhD)
Gregory B Baecher (Ph.D.)

== See also ==
- Probabilistic risk assessment
- Seismic hazard
- Seismic risk
