= Quebec Bridge =

Bridge in Quebec City and Lévis, Quebec

Quebec Bridge Pont de Québec
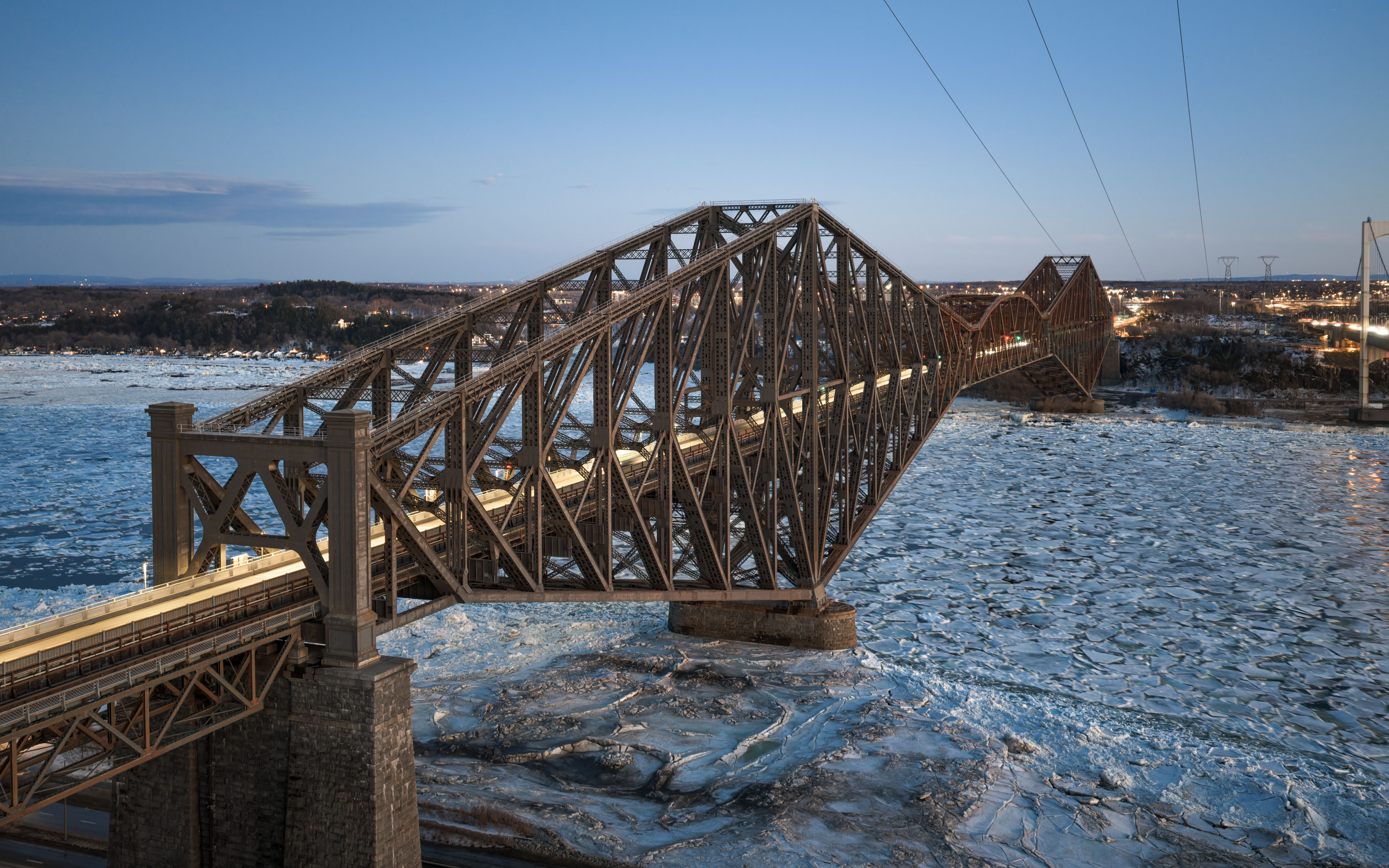
- The Quebec Bridge from the west side
- Coordinates: 46°44′46″N 71°17′16″W
- Carries: Route 175; Canadian National Railway and Via Rail; 1 pedestrian walkway
- Crosses: St. Lawrence River
- Locale: Quebec City, and Lévis, Quebec
- Owner: Government of Canada
- Maintained by: Government of Canada (overall structure), Canadian National Railway (rail track only), Government of Quebec (road deck only)
- Preceded by: Pierre Laporte Bridge
- Followed by: Île d'Orléans Bridge (partial crossing)

Characteristics
- Design: Cantilever bridge
- Total length: 987 m (3,238 ft)
- Width: 29 m (95 ft) wide
- Longest span: 549 m (1,801 ft)
- Clearance above: (?)
- Clearance below: 46 m (151 ft) (high tide)
- No. of lanes: 3

Rail characteristics
- No. of tracks: 1
- Track gauge: 1,435 mm (4 ft 8 1/2 in) standard gauge
- Structure gauge: AAR
- Electrified: No

History
- Construction cost: $22 million (Approx. 375M$ in 2024)
- Opened: 3 December 1919

Statistics
- Toll: none since 1942

National Historic Site of Canada
- Designated: 1995

Location
- Interactive map of Quebec Bridge

The Quebec Bridge (French: pont de Québec) is a road, rail, and pedestrian bridge across the lower Saint Lawrence River between Sainte-Foy (a former suburb that in 2002 became the arrondissement Sainte-Foy–Sillery–Cap-Rouge in Quebec City) and Lévis, in Quebec, Canada. The project failed twice during its construction, in 1907 and 1916, at the cost of 88 lives and additional people injured. The bridge eventually opened in 1919.

The Quebec Bridge is a riveted-steel truss structure and is 987 metres (3,238 feet) long, 29 metres (95 ft) wide, and 104 metres (341 ft) high. Cantilever arms 177 metres (581 ft) long support a 195-metre (640 ft) central structure, for a total span of 549 metres (1,801 ft), still the longest cantilever bridge span in the world. (It was the all-categories longest span in the world until the Ambassador Bridge was completed in 1929.) It is the easternmost (farthest downstream) complete crossing of the Saint Lawrence River.

The bridge accommodates three highway lanes (there were none until 1929, when one was added; another was added in 1949 and a third in 1993), one rail line (two until 1949), and a pedestrian walkway (originally two). At one time, it also carried a streetcar line. From 1993 until 2024, it was owned by the Canadian National Railway, before it was purchased by the Government of Canada for a symbolic $1.

The Quebec Bridge was designated a National Historic Site in 1995.

== Background ==
Before the Quebec Bridge was built, the only way to travel from the south shore of the St. Lawrence in Lévis to the north shore at Quebec City was to take a ferry or to use the wintertime ice bridge. The construction of a bridge over the St. Lawrence River at Quebec was considered as early as 1852. It was further discussed in 1867, 1882, and 1884. After a period of political instability during which Canada had four prime ministers in five years, Wilfrid Laurier, the Member of Parliament for the federal riding of Quebec East, was elected on a Liberal platform in 1896 and led the push to build the Quebec Bridge until he left office in 1911.

A March 1897 article in the Quebec Morning Chronicle noted:

The bridge question has again been revived after many years of slumber, and business men in Quebec seem hopeful that something will come of it, though the placing of a subsidy on the statute book is but a small part of the work to be accomplished, as some of its enthusiastic promoters will, ere long, discover. Both Federal and Provincial Governments seem disposed to contribute towards the cost, and the City of Quebec will also be expected to do its share. Many of our people have objected to any contribution being given by the city unless the bridge is built opposite the town, and the CHRONICLE like every other good citizen of Quebec would prefer to see it constructed at Diamond Harbor, and has contended in the interests of the city for this site as long as there seemed to be any possibility of securing it there. It would still do so if it appeared that our people could have it at that site. A bridge at Diamond Harbor would, it estimated, cost at least eight millions. It would be very nice to have, with its double track, electric car track, and roads for vehicles and pedestrians, and would no doubt create a goodly traffic between the two towns, and be one of the show works of the continent.

== First design and collapse of 29 August 1907 ==
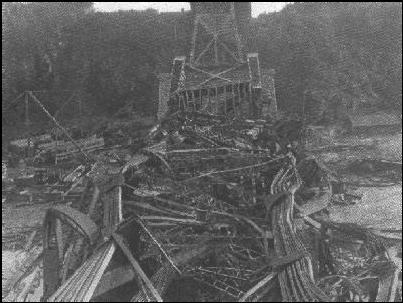
Wreckage of the 1907 collapse

The Quebec Bridge was included in the National Transcontinental Railway project, undertaken by the federal government. The Quebec Bridge Company was first incorporated by Act of Parliament under the government of Sir John A. Macdonald in 1887, later revived in 1891, and revived for good in 1897 by the government of Wilfrid Laurier, who granted them an extension of time in 1900.

In 1903, the bond issue was increased to $6,000,000 and power to grant preference shares was authorised, along with a name change to the Quebec Bridge and Railway Company (QBRC). An Act of Parliament the same year was necessary to guarantee the bonds by the public purse. Laurier was the MP for Quebec East riding, while the president of the QBRC, Simon-Napoleon Parent, was Quebec City's mayor from 1894 to 1906 and simultaneously served as Premier of Quebec from 1900 to 1905.

Edward A. Hoare was selected as Chief Engineer for the Company throughout this time, while Collingwood Schreiber was the Chief Engineer of the Department of Railways and Canals in Ottawa. Hoare had never worked on a cantilever bridge structure longer than 300 feet (91 m). Schreiber was assisted until 9 July 1903 by Department bridge engineer R.C. Douglas, at which time Douglas was deposed for his opposition to the calculations that were submitted by the contractors. Schreiber subsequently requested the support of another qualified bridge engineer, but was effectively overruled by the Cabinet on 15 August 1903. Thereafter, QBRC consulting engineer Theodore Cooper was completely in charge of the works. On 1 July 1905, Schreiber was demoted and replaced as deputy minister and chief engineer by Matthew J Butler.

By 1904, the southern half of the structure was taking shape. However, preliminary calculations made early in the planning stages were never properly checked when the design was completed. All went well until the bridge was nearing completion in the summer of 1907, when the QBRC site engineering team under Norman McLure began noticing increasing distortions of key structural members already in place: the bridge’s dead load was proving too heavy, with its own weight being far in excess of its carrying capacity.

McLure became increasingly concerned and wrote repeatedly to QBRC consulting engineer Theodore Cooper, who at first replied that the problems were minor. The Phoenix Bridge Company officials claimed that the beams must already have been bent before they were installed, but by 27 August it had become clear to McLure that this was wrong. A more experienced engineer might have telegraphed Cooper, but McLure wrote him a letter, and went to New York to meet with him two days later. Cooper agreed that the issue was serious, and promptly telegraphed to the Phoenix Bridge Company: "Add no more load to bridge till after due consideration of facts." The two engineers went to the Phoenix offices.

Cooper's message was not passed on to Quebec before it was too late. Near quitting time on the afternoon of 29 August, after four years of construction, the south arm and part of the central section of the bridge collapsed into the St. Lawrence River in 15 seconds. Of the 86 workers on the bridge that day, 75 were killed and the rest were injured, making it the world's worst bridge construction disaster. Of these victims, 33 (some sources say 35) were Mohawk steelworkers from the Kahnawake reserve near Montreal; they were buried at Kahnawake under crosses made of steel beams.

On 30 August 1907, a Royal Commission of inquiry into the disaster was provisionally appointed by the Deputy Minister in charge of the Department of Railways and Canals (Butler), with the concurrence of the Minister. The Royal Commission, which was granted by Edward VII by advice of his Governor General, Albert Grey, on 31 August 1907, consisted of three members, who were all engineers of good standing: Henry Holgate, of Montreal, JGG Kerry, of Campbellford, Ontario, also an instructor at McGill University, and Professor John Galbraith, then dean of the Faculty of Applied Science and Engineering at the University of Toronto. The Commission document conferred upon the commissioners full powers to summon witnesses and documents, and to express "any opinion they may see to express thereon".

The Commissioners included the hindsight work of consulting bridge engineer C.C. Schneider, of Philadelphia (a fulfillment of the 1903 request of Schreiber, supra), and presented their Report in full on 20 February 1908, which issued 15 conclusions.

The Commissioners attributed responsibility for the failure to two men, consulting engineer Theodore Cooper and Peter L. Szlapka, Chief Designing Engineer for Phoenix Bridge Company:

(c) The design of the chords that failed was made by Mr. P.L. Szlapka, the designing engineer of the Phoenix Bridge Company

(d) This design was examined and officially approved by Mr. Theodore Cooper, consulting engineer of the Quebec Bridge and Railway Company.

(e) The failure cannot be attributed directly to any cause other than errors in judgment on the part of these two engineers.

Cooper escaped penal sanction. It is presumed that Szlapka escaped as well. The Commissioners also found that:

(k) The failure on the part of the Quebec Bridge and Railway Company to appoint an experienced bridge engineer to the position of chief engineer was a mistake. This resulted in a loose and inefficient supervision of all parts of the work on the part of the Quebec Bridge and Railway Company.

The abortive construction of the Quebec Bridge spanned the careers of two Ministers of Railways and Canals, and one temporary replacement, who was on the job for five months immediately preceding the disaster. A popular myth is that the iron and the steel from the collapsed bridge, which could not be reused for construction, was used to forge the early Iron Rings that started to be worn by graduates of Canadian engineering schools in 1925.

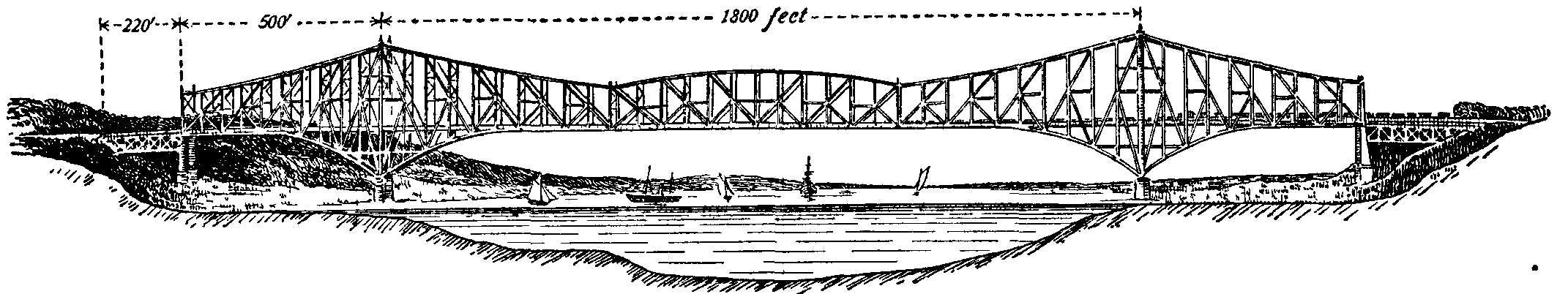
Drawing of the original design of Quebec Bridge

== Second design and collapse of 11 September 1916 ==
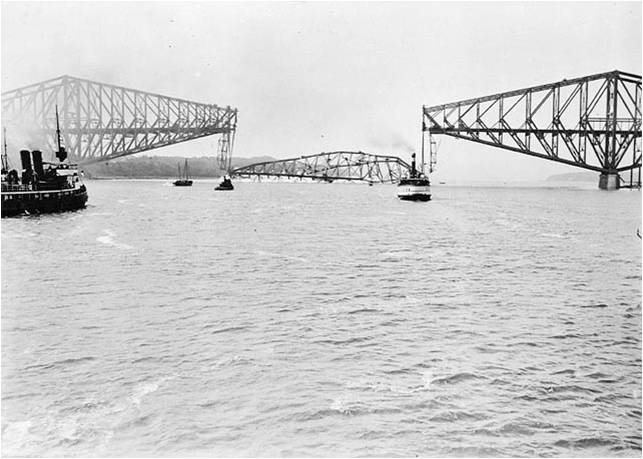
11 September 1916, Quebec Bridge Collapse

After a Royal Commission of Inquiry into the collapse, construction started on a second bridge. Three engineers were appointed: H. E. Vautelet, a former engineer for the Canadian Pacific Railways, Maurice FitzMaurice from Britain, who worked on the construction of the Forth Bridge, and Ralph Modjeski from Chicago, Illinois. Vautelet was President and Chief Engineer. The new design was again for a bridge with a single long compound cantilever span but with a more massive structure.

On 11 September 1916, when the central span was being raised into position, it fell into the river, killing 13 workers. Fears of German sabotage were reported because the Great War had begun, but it became apparent that the central span had collapsed because of the failure of a casting in the erection equipment.

Re-construction began almost immediately after the accident, and the government granted special permission for the bridge builders to acquire the needed steel, which was in high demand because of the War effort. After the bridge was completed in 1917, special passes were required for those wanting to cross the bridge. Armed soldiers, and later Dominion Police, guarded the structure and checked passes until the end of the War.

== Completion ==
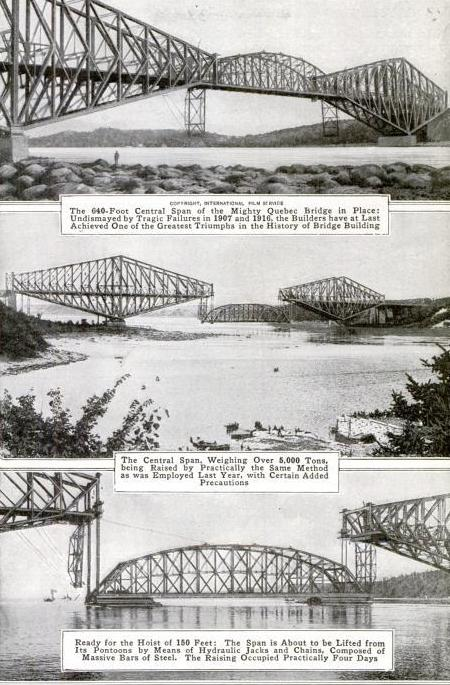
Lifting the centre span in place was considered to be a major engineering achievement. Photo caption from Popular Mechanics magazine, December 1917

Construction was ultimately completed in September 1917 at a total cost of $23 million and the lives of 88 bridgeworkers. On 17 October, the first train crossed the bridge from Quebec to Lévis, and on 3 December 1917, the Quebec Bridge officially opened for rail traffic, after almost two decades of construction. Its centre span of 549 m (1800 ft) remains the longest cantilevered bridge span in the world and is considered a major engineering feat. The Quebec Bridge was declared an International Historic Civil Engineering Landmark in 1987 by the Canadian and American Society of Civil Engineers.

== Post-completion history ==
The bridge was built and designed primarily as a railway bridge, but the streetcar lines (used by Quebec Railway, Light & Power Company) and one of the two railway tracks were converted into automobile and pedestrian/cycling lanes in subsequent years. In 1970, the Pierre Laporte Suspension Bridge opened just upstream to accommodate freeway traffic on Autoroute 73.

On 24 November 1995, the bridge was declared a National Historic Site.

The bridge has been featured on two commemorative postage stamps, one issued by the Post Office Department in 1929, and another by Canada Post in 1995.

The bridge was built as part of the National Transcontinental Railway, which was merged into the Canadian Government Railways and later became part of the Canadian National Railway (CN). The Canadian Government Railways company was maintained by the federal government until 1993, when a Privy Council order dated 22 July authorized the sale of Canadian Government Railways to the Crown corporation CN for one Canadian dollar. On that date, the Quebec Bridge also came under complete ownership of CN. CN was privatized in November 1995, making the bridge privately owned.

Despite its private ownership, CN received federal and provincial funding to undertake repairs and maintenance on the structure. Its railway designation is mile 0.2 subdivision Bridge.

== Aftermath of the collapse ==
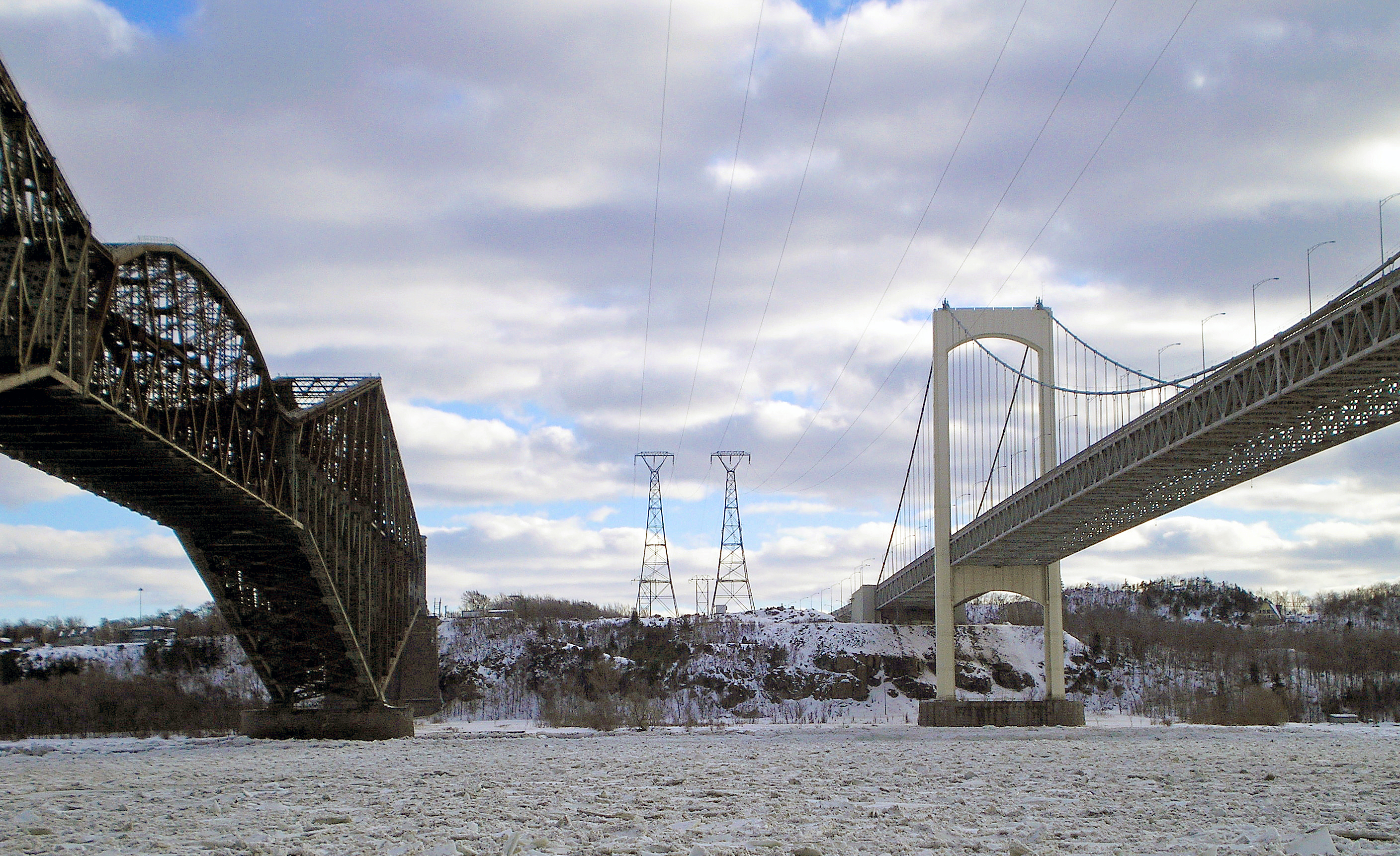
Quebec Bridge and Pierre Laporte Bridge in winter

The disaster showed the dangers of inadequately supervised work. As a protection from it, Galbraith and other engineers formed around 1925 what are now recognized as organizations of Professional Engineers (P.Engs). Professional Engineers are under different rules and regulations based on the organization to which they belong. General guidelines include that an engineer must pass an ethical examination, be able to show good character through the use of character witnesses, and have applicable engineering experience (in Canada that constitutes a minimum of four years' practice under a certified Professional Engineer). Moreover, engineers must be registered in the province in which they work. These engineering organizations are regulated by the respective provinces and the title "Professional Engineer" (or "Ingénieur" in Quebec) is reserved only to members who belong to this organization.

On 29 August 2006, a year-long commemoration was begun in the Kahnawake Reserve for the lives of the 33 Mohawk men who died in 1907. One year later, on 29 August 2007, memorial services were held to dedicate a concrete structure displaying the victims' names on the Lévis side of the bridge, and to unveil a steel replica of the bridge in Kahnawake.

== Corrosion and maintenance ==
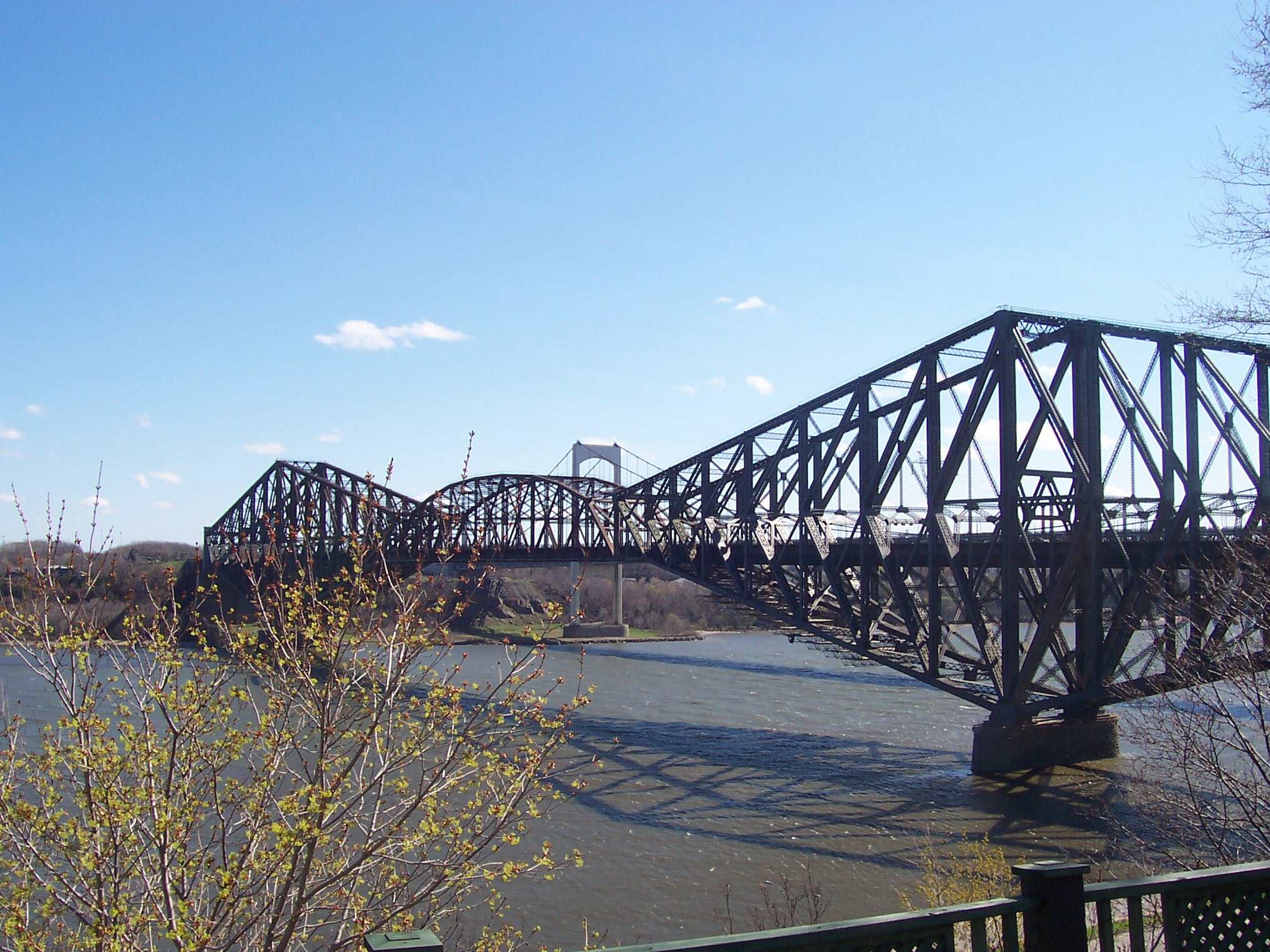
The bridge seen from the Parc Aquarium du Québec

In 2015, the Quebec Bridge was included in a list of the 10 most endangered historic sites in Canada by the National Trust of Canada because of long-overdue paint and repair work.

It is estimated that 60% of the bridge is covered in corrosive rust. Since its transfer to CN Rail by the federal government in 1993, maintenance and restoration programs for this historic infrastructure have been cut back. In November 2014, the City of Quebec, City of Lévis, Province of Quebec, and Government of Canada joined in pledging half the estimated $200 million cost of repainting and restoring the Quebec Bridge. To date, CN Rail has not agreed to match this amount. CN Rail has deemed the proposed sanding and restorative paint work to be "aesthetic" and therefore unnecessary, a categorization supported by a ruling of the Superior Court of Quebec.
The corrosion, accelerated by exposure to extremes of weather, will ultimately result in the loss of the bridge's mechanical properties—and potentially, its structural integrity as well.

In May 2016, Jean-Yves Duclos, the Canadian federal cabinet minister in charge of the Quebec region, revealed that a lease agreement between the CN and the federal government indicated that the CN would not be required to pay more than $10 million towards the paint work until the lease expires in 2053. The Canadian government is now proposing to invest $75 million to paint the bridge and is asking the Quebec provincial government to step in and invest an estimated additional $275 million to complete the work. The mayor of Quebec City, Regis Labeaume, accused the federal government of breaching a promise made during the 2015 electoral campaign to act upon the maintenance of the bridge

== Government repurchase ==
On 10 May 2024, the Canadian Government and CN announced an agreement for the sale of the bridge for the symbolic sum of $1. The government committed to spending $1 billion over 25 years on repairs and maintenance. CN and the Quebec government will share ownership of the rails and roadway that cross the bridge.

== See also ==
- List of crossings of the Saint Lawrence River
- List of bridges in Canada
- High Steel, a 1966 documentary on Mohawk high steel workers that also documents the 1907 collapse
