= Axle load =

Total weight bearing on the roadway for all wheels connected to a given axle

The axle load of a wheeled vehicle is the total weight bearing on the roadway for all wheels connected to a given axle. Axle load is an important design consideration in the engineering of roadways and railways, as both are designed to tolerate a maximum weight-per-axle (axle load); exceeding the maximum rated axle load will cause damage to the roadway or railway tracks.

== Railway use ==
On railways, a given section of tracks is designed to support a maximum axle load. The maximum axle load is determined by train speeds, weight of rails, density of sleepers and fixtures, amount and standard of ballast, and strength of bridges and earthworks. Higher operating speeds can be achieved by reducing axle loads and increased load-carrying capacity. Operating above the specified load can cause catastrophic failure of track components. The diameter of the wheels also affects the maximum axle load of a Talgo RD wagon.

=== United Kingdom ===
The standard rail weight for British railways is now 113 lb/yd (56.1 kg/m). Before the 1990s, most diesel locomotives were built to a maximum axle load of 19 long tons (19.3 tonnes; 21.3 short tons) so the maximum locomotive weight was 76 long tons (77.2 tonnes; 85.1 short tons) for a four-axle locomotive and 114 long tons (115.8 tonnes; 127.7 short tons) for a six-axle one. Higher axle loads are now permitted, e.g. the Class 67 locomotive is a four-axle machine weighing 90 tonnes (88.6 long tons; 99.2 short tons), giving 22.5 tonnes (22.1 long tons; 24.8 short tons) on each axle.

=== Australia ===
The Fortescue railway uses 68-kilogram-per-metre (140 lb/yd) rail on concrete sleepers and has a maximum axle load of 40 t (39 long tons; 44 short tons), which as of 2008 was the highest axle load of any railway in the world. In 2011, it was proposed to increase the axle load of the railway to 42 tonnes (41 long tons; 46 short tons).

=== Kenya ===
In 2022, sixteen new metre-gauge locomotives were supplied by CRRC with axleloads of 12.5 tonnes, 14 tonnes, and 18 tonnes respectively.

=== Bridge loading ===
Bridges may have to carry several locomotives or wagons at the same time. especially on longer spans; in that case they require separate calculation of maximum allowable axle load. A weak bridge may limit the axle load of the full line. Theodore Cooper developed the E10 loading system for calculating the strength of bridges.

== Roadway use ==
The term axle load is also applicable to trucks, and this context is made more complex by some trucks having more than two wheels per axle. The axle load remains the same, but the load borne by the individual wheels is reduced by having more contact area (more wheels, larger tires, lower tire pressure) to distribute the load.

== See also ==
- Federal Bridge Gross Weight Formula
- Gross axle weight rating
- Rail profile
