= Vijay P. Singh =

American hydrologist

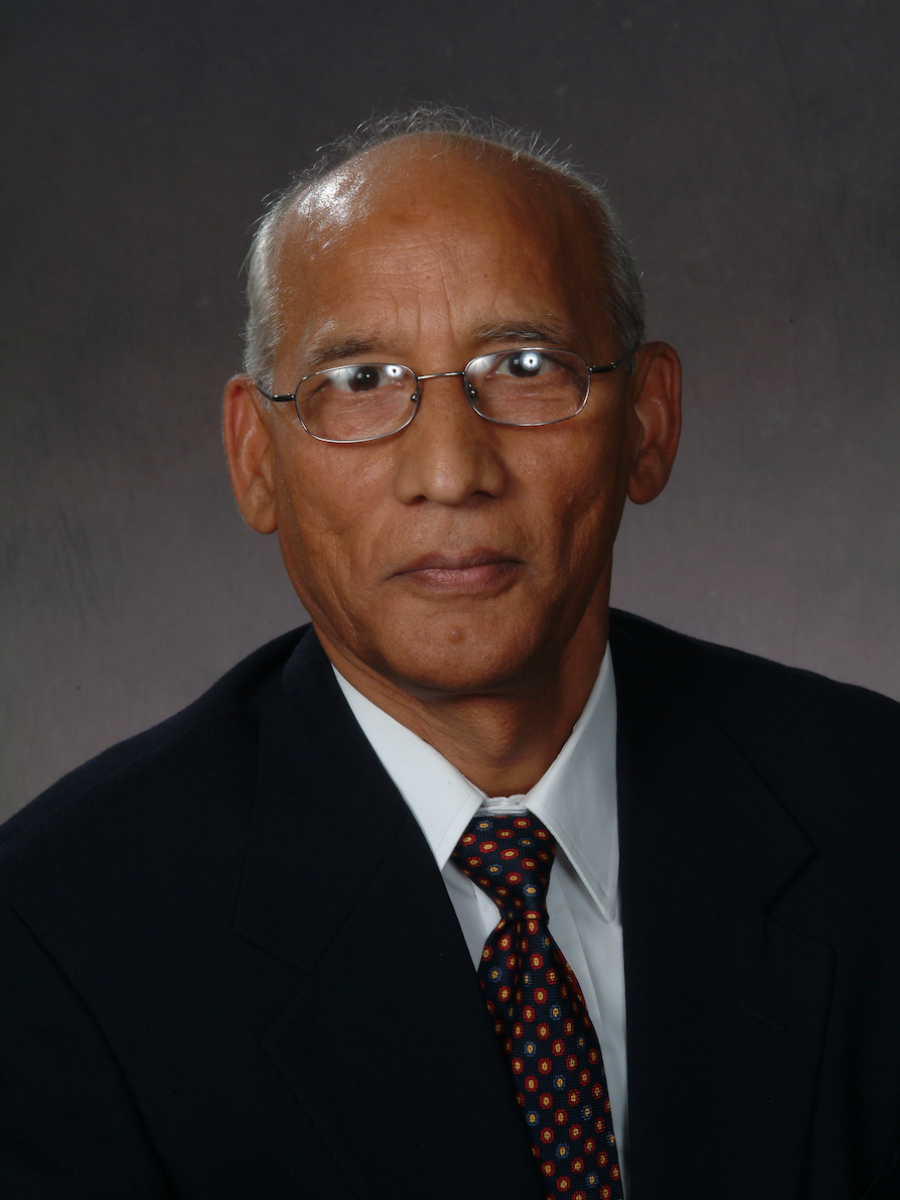
- Born: July 15, 1946 (age 80); Agra, India
- Education: U.P. Agricultural University, University of Guelph, Colorado State University
- Awards: Ven Te Chow Award, Ray K. Linsley Award, Norman Medal
- Scientific career
- Fields: Hydraulics and Hydrology
- Workplaces: Texas A&M University
- Doctoral advisor: David Woolhiser

Vijay P. Singh (born July 15, 1946) is a Distinguished Professor and a Regents Professor, and holds the Caroline and William N. Lehrer Distinguished Chair in Water Engineering at Texas A&M University. His research interests include Surface-water Hydrology, Groundwater Hydrology, Hydraulics, Irrigation Engineering, Environmental Quality, and Water Resources.

== Birth and education ==
Vijay P. Singh was born in Agra, India in 1946. He graduated with a BS in Engineering and Technology with emphasis on Soil and Water Conservation Engineering from [G.B Pant University of Agriculture and Technology], India in 1967. He earned an MS in engineering with specialization in Hydrology from University of Guelph, Canada in 1970 and a Ph.D. in Civil Engineering with specialization in Hydrology and Water Resources from Colorado State University, Fort Collins, USA in 1974. He also earned a D.Sc. from the University of the Witwatersrand, Johannesburg, South Africa in 1998.

He was elected a member of the National Academy of Engineering (NAE) in 2022 for his contributions to wave modeling and development of entropy-based theories of hydrologic processes and hydroclimatic extremes.

Vijay P. Singh is also a two-time winner of the Norman Medal, the highest honor by the American Society of Civil Engineers established in 1872 to recognize engineering papers distinguished by their "practical value" and "impact on engineering practice". He is one of the few scientists to have received this award twice: he won a Norman Medal in 2010 for a paper with Tommaso Moramarco and Claudia Pandolfo, and in 2023 for a paper with Solomon Vimal.
