= Carl E. Grunsky =

American geologist and civil engineer

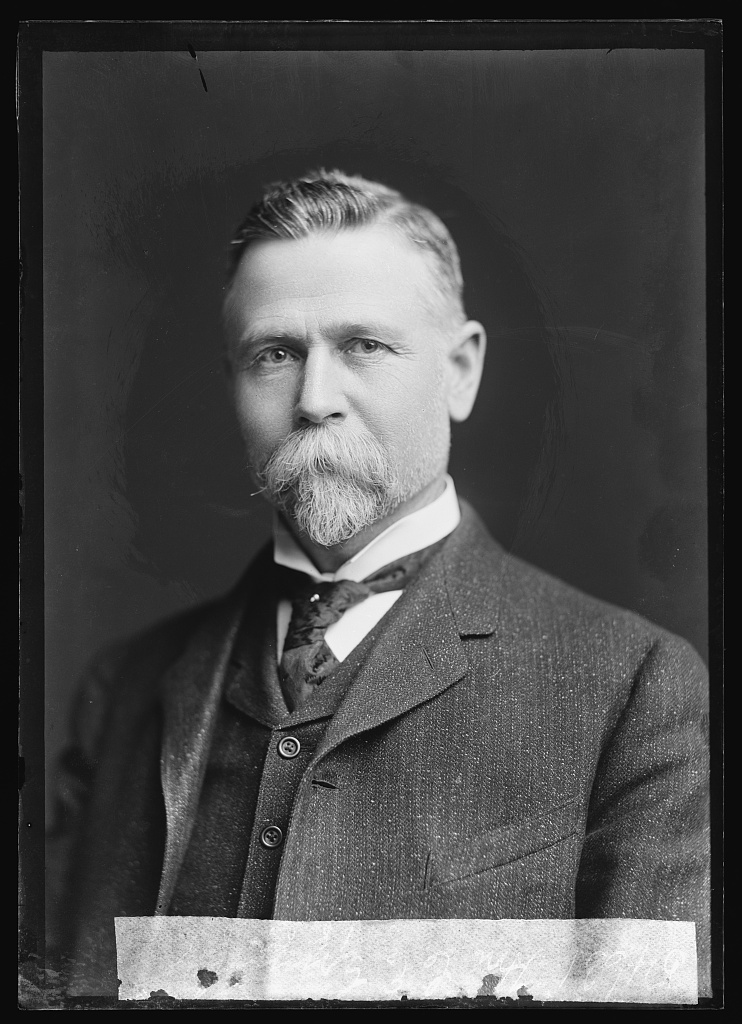
Carl Ewald Grunsky by C. M. Bell Studio

Carl Ewald Grunsky (April 4, 1855 – June 9, 1934) was an American geologist and civil engineer.

== Biography ==
In 1896, Grunsky implemented the innovative gravity-based sewer channeling waste rapidly from North Point to Golden Gate or towards Oakland. He served as member on the Board of Trustees from 1898 to 1904 at the California Academy of Sciences where in 1911 he was promoted to secretary and was elected president in 1912.

Before entering the field of geology and civil engineering, Grunsky pursued a career in medicine. After entering a Realschule and Polytechnikum in Stuttgart, Germany, he switched to civil engineering. After starting his first career as a city engineer of San Francisco, from 1900 to 1904, and gaining recognition, he consequently became a member of the Panama Canal Commission from 1904 to 1905. From 1905 to 1907, he served as a consulting engineer for the US Reclamation Service.

He succeeded Dr. Barton Warren Evermann and acted as a director of Museum of Academy and the Steinhart Aquarium in 1932. Grunsky spent most of his time working to supervise the rivers. After receiving the Norman Medal of the American Society of Civil Engineers in 1910, he was elected vice president in 1922 and president in 1924. In 1924 he was also president of the Pacific Division of the American Association for the Advancement of Science. He was president of the American Engineering Council from 1930 to 1931. He played a significant role during the St. Francis Dam expedition. Grunsky and his co-worker John C. Branner announced that the dam was working properly right before the St. Francis dam broke. The breakage of the dam marked the end of William Mulholland's career.

G. D. Hanna describes Grunsky as follows: "One faculty he possessed fitted him particularly for presiding over meetings and groups of people. He was a very clear thinker and could organize his subject matter rapidly, yet he spoke with deliberation and crisp enunciation. Political science, particularly those phases dealing with rates, taxation and forms of money, fascinated him and he published extensively on the subject . He was always interested in art and during his later years found time to paint some backgrounds of the habitat groups of African animals now being installed by the academy."

Grunsky died during an accident at his home in Berkeley, California, on June 9, 1934.

== Selected works ==
- Grunsky, C.E. (1899-10-21). Report Upon a System of Sewerage for the City and County of San Francisco. City of San Francisco.

== Sources ==
- Baume, Matt (2010-10-04). "Touring San Francisco's Historic Sewer System". Sf.streetsblog.org.
- New Series, Vol. 79, No. 2060 (Jun. 22, 1934), p. 556 Published by: American Association for the Advancement of Science
