= Theodore Cooper =

American civil engineer (1839–1919)

- Born: January 13, 1839; Cooper's Plains, New York, U.S.
- Died: August 24, 1919 (aged 80); New York City, U.S.
- Education: Resselaer Institute
- Engineering career
- Projects: Quebec Bridge
- Significant design: Cooper's loading system
- Awards: Norman Medal (1890, 1889)
- Military career
- Branch: United States Navy
- Service years: 1861–1872
- Rank: First Assistant Engineer

Theodore Cooper (January 13, 1839 – August 24, 1919) was an American civil engineer. He may be best known as consulting engineer on the Quebec Bridge that collapsed in 1907.

== Biography ==
Upon receiving a degree in civil engineering from Resselaer Institute (now Rensselaer Polytechnic Institute) in 1858, Cooper accepted a position as assistant engineer on the Troy and Greenfield Railroad and Hoosac Tunnel. He entered the Navy in 1861; his military career lasted over a decade and included active duty aboard the gunboat Chocorua and the Nyack in the South Pacific, as well as assignments as an instructor and engineer at the Naval Academy. After resigning from the Navy in 1872 with the rank of first assistant engineer, he was appointed inspector at the Midvale Steel Works by James Eads, designer of the noteworthy Mississippi River steel arch bridge (Eads Bridge) at St. Louis; he succeeded Eads as engineer of the Bridge and Tunnel Company from 1872 to 1875. Cooper was also assistant engineer in charge of the construction of the first elevated railroads in New York City. He was one of the five expert engineers selected by the president to determine the Hudson River bridge span. Cooper was also the consulting engineer for the New York Public Library.

Cooper's designs included a broad variety of structures, ranging from the Laredo Shops of the Mexican National Railroad to the furnace plant of the Lackawanna Coal and Iron Company at Scranton, Pennsylvania, but his most memorable contributions were in the area of bridge design. His bridge-building career extended from his discharge from the Navy until his retirement in 1907. He designed the Junction Bridges over the Allegheny River at Pittsburgh (1876), the Seekonk Bridge at Providence, Rhode Island, the Second Avenue Bridge over the Harlem River at New York City, and the Newburyport (Massachusetts) Bridge over the Merrimack River. The third Sixth Street Bridge has been identified as the only surviving structure entirely designed by Cooper, whose involvement extended even to such details as the bridge's handrail, lamps, and fascia.

Between 1885 and 1902, Cooper published several important works on railroad and highway bridge design. His theories strongly influenced the adoption of wheel-load analysis for railroad bridges. Also during this period, he served as consultant to numerous commissions charged with the development of rapid transit systems in such cities as New York and Boston. The career of this distinguished and celebrated engineer (twice awarded the Norman Medal by the American Society of Civil Engineers) ended in tragedy when the monumental Quebec Bridge, for which Cooper was consulting engineer, collapsed while under construction in 1907, resulting in 75 fatalities. Cooper was roundly criticized in post-accident reports for his poor judgement and lack of teamwork in the run-up to the disaster.

Cooper died in his home in New York City on August 24, 1919, of pneumonia. He was unmarried.

== Cooper's loading system ==
Cooper is also responsible for developing a system of calculations and standards for the safe loading of railway bridges in 1894. Cooper's loading system was based on a standard of E10, meaning a pair of 2-8-0 type steam locomotives, pulling an infinite number of rail cars. Each locomotive was given an axle loading of 10,000 pounds (4,536 kg) for the driving axles, 5,000 pounds (2,268 kg) for the leading truck, and 6,500 pounds (2,948 kg) for the tender trucks. Each trailing rail car was given an axle loading of 1,000 pounds per foot (1,488 kg/m) of track.

During the 1880s, railway bridges were built using an equivalent rating of E20. By 1894, when Cooper presented his standard, he recommended a standard of E40, or four times the E10 standard. By 1914, the standard had increased to E60. By the mid-1990s, the American Railway Engineering Association was recommending E72 (7.2 times the E10 standard) for concrete structures, and E80 for steel structures.

== See also ==
- Axle load
