= Norman Medal =

The Norman Medal is the highest honor granted by the American Society of Civil Engineers for a technical paper that makes a definitive contribution to engineering science and is distinguished by its "practical value" and "impact on engineering practice". The medal was instituted by ASCE in 1872 and originally endowed by George H. Norman, M.ASCE. In 1897, ASCE assumed responsibility for the Norman Medal.

This list contains recipients of the Norman Medal since 1874 (the first year it was awarded).

== Recipients ==
- 1874: J. James R. Croes (1834-1906)
- 1875: Theodore G. Ellis
- 1877: William W. Maclay; Book Prize To Julius H. Striedonger
- 1879: Edward P. North; Book Prize To Max E. Schmidt
- 1890: Theodore Cooper
- 1881: L. L. Buck
- 1882: A. Fteley And F. P. Stearns
- 1883: William P. Shinn
- 1884: James Christie
- 1885: Eliot C. Clarke
- 1886: Edward Bates Dorsey
- 1887: Desmond Fitzgerald
- 1888: E. E. Russel Tratman
- 1889: Theodore Cooper
- 1890: John R. Freeman
- 1891: John R. Freeman
- 1892: William Starling
- 1893: Desmond Fitzgerald
- 1894: Alfred E. Hunt
- 1895: William Hammond Hall
- 1896: John E. Greiner
- 1897: Julius Baier
- 1898: B. F. Thomas
- 1899: E. Herbert Stone
- 1900: James A. Seddon
- 1902: Gardner S. Williams; Clarence W. Hubbell; And George H. Fenkell
- 1904: Emile Low
- 1905: C. C. Schneider
- 1906: John S. Sewell
- 1907: Leonard M. Cox
- 1908: C. C. Schneider
- 1909: J. A. L. Waddell
- 1910: C. E. Grunsky
- 1911: George E. Gibbs
- 1912: Wilson Sherman Kinnear
- 1913: J. V. Davies
- 1914: Caleb Mills Saville
- 1915: Allen Hazen, J. A. L. Waddell
- 1916: J. A. L. Waddell
- 1917: Benjamin F. Groat
- 1918: L. R. Jorgensen, J. A. L. Waddell
- 1919: William Barclay Parsons
- 1920: J. A. L. Waddell
- 1922: Charles H. Paul
- 1923: D. B. Steinman
- 1924: B. F. Jakobsen
- 1925: Harrison P. Eddy
- 1926: Julian Hinds
- 1927: B. F. Jakobsen
- 1928: Charles E. Sudler
- 1929: Gilbert T. Rude
- 1930: Karl von Terzaghi
- 1931: Floyd A. Nagler And Albion Davis
- 1933: Hardy Cross
- 1934: Leon Solomon Moisseiff
- 1935: D. C. Henny
- 1936: Daniel W. Mead
- 1937: J. C. Stevens
- 1938: Hunter Rouse
- 1939: Charles H. Lee
- 1940: Shortridge Hardesty And Harold E. Wessman
- 1941: J. A. Van Den Broek
- 1942: Karl Terzaghi
- 1943: Thomas E. Stanton
- 1944: Ralph B. Peck
- 1945: Merrill Bernard
- 1946: Karl Terzaghi
- 1947: Boris A. Bakhmeteff And William Allan
- 1948: Alfred M. Freudenthal
- 1949: Gerard H. Matthes
- 1950: Friedrich Bleich
- 1951: D. B. Steinman
- 1953: Friedrich Bleich And L. W. Teller
- 1954: Robert H. Sherlock
- 1955: Karl Terzaghi
- 1956: Carl E. Kindsvater And Rolland W. Carter
- 1957: Alfred W. Freudenthal
- 1958: Anestis S. Veletsos And Nathan M. Newmark
- 1959: Willard J. Turnbull And Charles R. Foster
- 1960: Carl E. Kindsvater And Rolland W. Carter
- 1961: Lorenz G. Straub And Alvin G. Anderson
- 1962: William Mcguire And Gordon P. Fisher
- 1963: Bruno Thurlimann
- 1964: T. William Lambe
- 1965: Gerald A. Leonards And Jagdish Narain
- 1966: Charles H. Lawrence
- 1967: Daniel Dicker
- 1968: H. Bolton Seed And Kenneth L. Lee
- 1969: Basil W. Wilson
- 1970: Cyril J. Galvin, Jr.
- 1971: John H. Schmertmann
- 1972: Nicholas C. Costes; W. David Carrier, III; James K. Mitchell; And Ronald F. Scott
- 1973: Bobby O. Hardin And Vincent P. Drnevich
- 1974: James R. Coffer
- 1975: Roy E. Olson; David E. Daniel, Jr.; And Thomas K. Liu
- 1976: Charles C. Ladd And Roger Foott
- 1977: H. Bolton Seed; Kenneth L. Lee; Izzat M. Idriss; And Faiz I. Makdisi
- 1978: Richard D. Barksdale
- 1979: Anil K. Chopra
- 1980: John L. Cleasby And James C. Lorence
- 1982: Abdulaziz I. Mana And G. Wayne Clough
- 1983: Theodore V. Galambos, Bruce R. Ellingwood, James G. Macgregor, And C. Allin Cornell
- 1984: Sudipta S. Bandyopadhyay
- 1985: James L. Sherard; Lorn P. Dunnigan; And James R. Talbot
- 1986: James L. Sherard
- 1987: Egor P. Popov; Stephen A. Mahin; And Ray W. Clough
- 1988: Gholamreza Mesri And Alfonso Castro
- 1989: Abdul-Hamid Zureick And Robert A. Eubanks
- 1990: Anestis S. Veletsos And Anumolu M. Prasad
- 1991: Ernesto F. Cruz And Anil K. Chopra
- 1992: Scott D. Schiff; William J. Hall; And Douglas A. Foutch
- 1993: Ronie Navon And Abraham Warszawski
- 1994: Ronald D. Ziemian; William Mcguire; And Gregory G. Deierlein
- 1995: Mauricio Ehrlich and James K. Mitchell
- 1996: James R. Martin II and G. Wayne Clough
- 1997: William F. Marcuson III; Paul F. Hadala; and Richard H. Ledbetter
- 1998: Bruce R. Ellingwood and David Rosowsky
- 1999: Lawrence A. Bergman; Thomas K. Caughey; Anastasios G. Chassiakos; Richard O. Claus; George W. Housner; Sami F. Masri; Robert E. Skelton; Tsu T. Soong; B. F. Spencer; and James T. P. Yao
- 2000: Roberto T. Leon; Jerome F. Hajjar; Carol K. Shield; and Michael A.Gustafson
- 2001: Anil K. Chopra and Rakesh K. Goel
- 2002: Sherif El-Tawil and Gregory G. Deierlein
- 2003: C. Allin Cornell; Douglas A. Foutch; Ronald O. Hamburger; and Fatemeh Jalayer
- 2004: Gholamreza Mesri, Ph.D. and Marawan M. Shahien, Ph.D.
- 2005: Kok-Kwang Phoon, M.Asce; Fred Kulhawy, Ph.D., P.E., G.E., Hon.M.Asce; Mircea D. Grigoriu, Ph.D., F.Asce
- 2006: Ramachandran Kulasingam, Ph.D., A.M.ASCE; Erik J. Malvick, Ph.D., A.M.ASCE; Ross W. Boulanger, Ph.D., P.E., M.ASCE; and Bruce L. Kutter, Ph.D., M.ASCE
- 2007: Ning Lu, Ph.D., M.ASCE and William J. Likos, Ph.D., M.ASCE
- 2008: Amit Kanvinde, Ph.D., A.M.ASCE and Gregory G. Deierlein, P.E., F.ASCE
- 2009: Steven L. Kramer, Ph.D., P.E., M.ASCE and Roy T. Mayfield, P.E., M.ASCE
- 2010: Tommaso Moramarco, M.ASCE; Claudia Pandolfo; and Vijay P. Singh, Ph.D, D.SC., D.WRE, F.ASCE
- 2011: Shadi S. Najjar, D.Eng., A.M.ASCE and Robert B. Gilbert, P.E., D.GE., M.ASCE
- 2012: Mark Mahan, Ph.D., P.E., M.ASCE, Yannis F. Dafalias, Ph.D., M.ASCE, Mahdi Taiebat, Ph.D., P.Eng., M.ASCE, YeongAe Heo, Ph.D., and Sashi K. Kunnath, Ph.D. F.ASCE
- 2013: Anil K. Chopra, Ph.D., M.ASCE
- 2014: William J. Likos, Ph.D., M.ASCE and ASCE Rani Jaafar
- 2015: Jose D. Salas, Ph.D., M.ASCE and Jayantha Obeysekera, Ph.D., P.E., D.WRE, M.ASCE
- 2016: Brett W. Maurer, Ph.D., M.ASCE, Russell A. Green, Ph.D., P.E., M.ASCE, Misko Cubrinovski, Ph.D., and Brendon A. Bradley, Ph.D.
- 2017: Steven L. Kramer, Ph.D., P.E., M.ASCE and C.H. Wang, Ph.D., PMP
- 2018: Kara D. Peterman, EIT, A.M.ASCE; Matthew J.J. Stehman; Robert L. Madsen, P.E., M.ASCE; Stephen G. Buonopane, P.E., M.ASCE; Narutoshi Nakata, Ph.D., M.ASCE; and Benjamin W. Schafer, Ph.D., P.E., M.ASCE
- 2019: Jordan Aaron, Ph.D.; Oldrich Hungr, Ph.D.; Timothy Stark, Ph.D., P.E., D.GE, F.ASCE and Ahmed Baghdady, Ph.D., A.M.ASCE
- 2020: Chong Tang and Kok-Kwang Phoon, Ph.D., P.E., F.ASCE
- 2021: Ning Lu, Ph.D., F.EMI, F.ASCE; Chao Zhang, Ph.D., A.M.ASCE
- 2022: Farshid Vahedifard, Ph.D., P.E., F.ASCE; Firas Jasim; Fred Tracy; Masood Abdollah, S.M.ASCE; Aneseh Alborzi; Amir AghaKouchak, Ph.D., P.E., M.ASCE
- 2023: Vijay P. Singh, Ph.D, D.SC., D.WRE, F.ASCE; Solomon Vimal, Ph.D.

== See also ==
- List of engineering awards
