= Stephen A. Mahin =

American structural engineer

- Born: 16 October 1946; Lodi, California
- Died: 10 February 2018 (aged 71)
- Education: University of California, Berkeley
- Scientific career
- Fields: Earthquake engineering Structural Engineering
- Workplaces: University of California, Berkeley

Stephen A. Mahin (born Lodi, California; October 18, 1946 – February 10, 2018) was an American structural engineer. Mahin was a graduate of the Pacific Grove High School. Following his high school graduation, he attended the University of California, Berkeley, earning his bachelor's, master's, and doctoral degrees in civil engineering there. Upon earning his Ph.D., Mahin became an assistant research engineer at Berkeley before joining the faculty in 1974.

In 2014, Tongji University of Shanghai, China named Steve Mahin a Master Academician, a title which is given to the top 100 professors internationally in all fields by the National Natural Science Foundation of China.

Mahin later became the Byron L. and Elvira E. Nishkian Professor of Structural Engineering, and led the Structural Engineering, Mechanics, and Materials Program, as well as the Pacific Earthquake Engineering Research Center.

== Awards ==
- Walter Huber Civil Engineering Research Prize (1983)
- Norman Medal (1987)
- American Institute of Steel Construction (AISC) Lifetime Achievement Award (2013)
- Structural Engineers Association of Northern California Helmut Krawinkler Award (2017)
