= Anil K. Chopra =

Indian-American civil engineer (born 1941)

- Born: February 18, 1941 (age 85); Peshawar, British India
- Known for: Dynamics of Structures
- Awards: Norman Medal, Member of the National Academy of Engineering
- Scientific career
- Fields: Structural engineering, Earthquake engineering
- Workplaces: University of California, Berkeley

Anil K. Chopra (born February 18, 1941) is an Indian-American civil engineer and professor emeritus at the University of California, Berkeley, recognized for his work in structural dynamics and earthquake engineering. He is the author of the widely used textbook Dynamics of Structures: Theory and Applications to Earthquake Engineering.

== Early life and education ==
Chopra was born in Peshawar, British India, and earned a Bachelor of Science in Civil Engineering from Banaras Hindu University in 1960, where he received the University Gold Medal. He later completed his M.S. and Ph.D. in Civil Engineering at the University of California, Berkeley.

His graduate studies laid the foundation for his contributions to structural dynamics, including the development of methods used in earthquake-resistant design.

== Academic career ==
Chopra joined UC Berkeley in 1969 after a short appointment at the University of Minnesota. He served in leadership roles in the Structural Engineering, Mechanics, and Materials Engineering program and held the Horace, Dorothy, and Katherine Johnson Chair in Engineering. He retired in 2016.

== Research contributions ==
Chopra’s research has addressed the behavior of structures subjected to seismic forces. His work has been applied to buildings, dams, bridges, and soil-structure interaction systems. He contributed significantly to the computational techniques used in seismic analysis.

His textbook remains a key resource in the field. He also advanced understanding of fluid-structure interaction in dams, particularly in earthquake-prone regions.

== Publications ==
Chopra authored multiple books, including Earthquake Dynamics of Structures: A Primer. He published over 380 peer-reviewed articles covering structural analysis, dynamic modeling, and seismic design.

== Recognitions ==
He served as Executive Editor of Earthquake Engineering and Structural Dynamics and chaired the Structural Analysis Committee for the ATC-3 project. He has been active in organizations including ASCE and EERI.

In 2017, UC Berkeley hosted the Anil K. Chopra Symposium to honor his career.

== Personal philosophy and legacy ==
His work focuses on safer designs with greater resilience, and has helped shape modern seismic design practices.
