= Ralph Brazelton Peck =

Canadian-born American Professor of Geotechnical Engineering

Ralph B. Peck
- Born: June 23, 1912; Winnipeg, Manitoba, Canada
- Died: February 18, 2008 (aged 95); Albuquerque, New Mexico, U.S.
- Citizenship: United States
- Education: Rensselaer Polytechnic Institute; Harvard University
- Spouse: Marjorie E. Truby (1937 - 1996, her death)
- Scientific career
- Fields: Civil Engineering; Soil mechanics
- Workplaces: University of Illinois Urbana-Champaign; Holabird & Root
- Thesis: A Method for the Design of Suspension Bridges Using a Stiffness Criterion (1937)

Ralph Brazelton Peck (June 23, 1912 – February 18, 2008) was a civil engineer specializing in soil mechanics, the author and co-author of popular soil mechanics and foundation engineering text books, and Professor Emeritus of Civil Engineering at the University of Illinois Urbana-Champaign. In 1948, together with Karl von Terzaghi, Peck published the book Soil Mechanics in Engineering Practice, an influential geotechnical engineering text which continues to be regularly cited and is now in a third edition.

Peck made significant contributions to the field of geotechnical engineering, authoring more than 260 technical publications. He undertook work as a consultant on major projects including several large dams in his native Canada, the Itezhi-Tezhi Dam in Zambia, the Saluda Dam in South Carolina, the Wilson Tunnel in Hawaii, the Bay Area Rapid Transit System, and various metro systems including those of Baltimore, Los Angeles, and Washington, along with work on the foundations of the Rion-Antirion Bridge in Greece.

He was elected as a member of the National Academy of Engineering in 1965, and honored with the National Medal of Science in 1975 by President Gerald Ford for "his development of the science and art of subsurface engineering, combining the contributions of the sciences of geology and soil mechanics with the practical art of foundation design". The Ralph B. Peck Lecture and Medal was established in 2000 by the Geo-Institute of the American Society of Civil Engineers.

== Early life and career ==
Peck was born in Winnipeg to American parents, Orwin K. and Ethel Huyek Peck, while his father was working as a bridge engineer for the Grand Trunk Pacific Railroad in Canada. He earned a civil engineering degree in 1934 and a doctor of civil engineering degree in 1937, both from Rensselaer Polytechnic Institute.

Between 1937 and 1938, Peck worked as a structural detailer at the American Bridge Company. Following this, from 1938 to 1939, he furthered his education by enrolling in a soil mechanics course at Harvard University, where he also served as a laboratory assistant to Arthur Casagrande. Between 1939 and 1942, Peck was the assistant engineer at the City of Chicago Subway. In this position, he represented Karl Terzaghi, who had been engaged as a consultant for the Chicago Subway Construction Project. Peck had been proposed for the role by Casagrande. Peck also spent some time as an engineer in Marion, Ohio with Holabird & Root, before assuming the position of Assistant Research Professor at the University of Illinois in 1942.

== Teaching, consulting and publishing career ==
Peck's teaching career at the University of Illinois lasted from December 1942 until his retirement in 1974. Early in Peck's tenure, he taught structures and structural engineering, but would gradually increase his focus on geotechnics, particularly after Karl Terzaghi became a regular visitor. The pair's collaboration deepened when Terzaghi was named a visiting research professor in the Department of Civil Engineering in April 1945. Their collaborative work extended to the publication of a popular and influential textbook, Soil Mechanics in Engineering Practice, in 1948. The book remains in print and has been published in a third edition, co-authored with Gholamreza Mesri.

In 1953, along with Walter Hanson and Thomas Thornburn, Peck published Foundation Engineering, a textbook covering the practical application of soil mechanics and foundation engineering techniques, which included short biographies of many of the most pivotal figures and key collaborators of Peck's in soil mechanics up to that time, such as Terzaghi, Casagrande, and Alec Skempton. A second edition appeared in 1974.

Peck retired from full-time teaching in 1974, becoming Professor Emeritus, continuing to deliver lectures on a number of occasions each year. Peck settled with his family in Albuquerque, New Mexico and continued to work until 2006 as a highly respected and influential consulting engineer. He undertook over 1,000 consulting projects including foundation engineering, ore storage facilities, tunnel projects, dams, and dikes, including the Cannelton and Uniontown lock and dam construction failures on the Ohio River, the dams in the James Bay project, the Trans-Alaska Pipeline System, the Dead Sea dikes and the Rion-Antirion Bridge in Greece.

During his career Peck authored over 260 publications, and served as president of the International Society of Soil Mechanics and Foundation Engineering from 1969 until 1973, an organization he was deeply involved with for most of his career.

On 8 May 2009, the Norwegian Geotechnical Institute in Oslo opened the Ralph B. Peck Library, located next to the Karl Terzaghi Library in the same building. The libraries include correspondence between the two men, with the Terzaghi library focused on the birth and growth of soil mechanics, whilst the Ralph B. Peck Library is dedicated to the practice of foundation engineering. Diaries from between 1940 and 1942 containing Peck's work with the Chicago Subway are included, along with papers and reports on many of his subsequent projects.

== Awards and recognition ==
Peck received numerous awards during his career, including The Norman Medal of the American Society of Civil Engineers for his paper, Earth-pressure measurements in open cuts, Chicago Subway in 1944. Aged 31, Peck was the youngest single author to have received the award. In 1965, he was elected as a member of the National Academy of Engineering, and the ASCE awarded him the Wellington Prize in the same year. In 1969 he delivered the 9th Rankine Lecture at the invitation of the Institution of Civil Engineers. He received the Karl Terzaghi Award from the ASCE in 1969, and the US Army Civil Service Medal in 1973.

He was awarded the National Medal of Science in 1974, being nominated by Linus Pauling. However, political opposition with Pauling meant that then-president Richard Nixon refused to present the award in person, and Peck received it one year later from Gerald Ford. Other awards received by Peck included the 1976 Washington Medal from the ASCE, the John Fritz Medal in 1988, and the 2005 Outstanding Civil Engineering Achievement award from the ASCE for his work on the Rion-Antirion bridge in Greece, the first time this award was given for work outside the United States.

In 2000, the ASCE created the Ralph B. Peck Award to honor outstanding contributions to geotechnical engineering profession through the publication of a thoughtful, carefully researched case history or histories, or the publication of recommended practices or design methodologies based on the evaluation of case histories.

== Personal life ==
Peck married Marjorie E. Truby in 1937. The couple had a daughter and son.

== Death ==
Peck died on 18 February 2008, from congestive heart failure.
