= Ruth Doggett Terzaghi =

American geologist

- Born: October 14, 1903; Chicago, United States
- Died: March 3, 1992 (aged 88); Winchester, MA
- Spouse: Karl von Terzaghi
- Children: Eric Terzaghi, Margaret Terzaghi-Howe
- Awards: Clemens Herschel Award Honorary membership in the Association of Engineering Geologists First woman to be recognized as a Fellow of the Geological Society of America
- Scientific career
- Fields: Geology Earth Sciences

Ruth Doggett Terzaghi (October 14, 1903 – March 3, 1992) was an American geologist and civil engineer (Peck, 1993, p. 91). She held several teaching positions relating to geology and engineering geology (Peck, 1993, p. 91). In addition to pursuing her own research, she assisted her husband Karl Von Terzaghi in many of his geotechnical engineering and soil mechanics projects. (Peck, 1993, p. 91; Ogilvie, 2003, p. 1275)

== Early life ==
Terzaghi was born on October 14, 1903, in Chicago, Illinois, daughter of Lewis and Grace Doggett (Peck, 1993). She had one brother and two sisters, all of whom gained their early education in both public and private schools (Peck, 1993, p. 91).

== Education ==
Doggett Terzaghi graduated from high school with a passion for the subject of earth sciences, thus leading her to pursue a degree in geology and earth sciences at the University of Chicago (Peck, 1993, p. 91). Doggett Terzaghi later graduated from the program in 1924, and went on to pursue a Master of Science in geology, which she claimed in 1925 focusing on her thesis about the origin of abnormally steep dips in the Niagaran reefs of the Chicago region (Peck, 1993, p. 91). She later received her Ph.D. in geology from Harvard in 1930, after studying at Radcliffe College, the female-coordinated liberal arts college affiliated with Harvard College. (Peck, 1993, p. 91; Ogilvie, 2003, p. 1275; Rogers & Carl, 2013, p. 13).

== Academic career ==
While attaining her M.S. in geology from the University of Chicago and her Ph.D. in geology from Harvard, Terzaghi took on two additional positions as a professor of geology (Peck, 1993, p. 91). The first of her roles as a professor was at Goucher College from 1925 to 1926, and the second at Wellesley College from 1926 to 1928 (Peck, 1993, p. 91). Independent academic engagements and research pursuits excluded Terzaghi out of the educational profession for some time (Peck, 1993, p. 91). It was not until 1957 that she took on another professor position at the Graduate School of Engineering at Harvard (Peck, 1993, p. 91). She taught as a professor of Engineering Geology, where she remained until 1961. Terzaghi was then hired as a research fellow from 1963 to 1970, all while pursuing her own research and interests in the field of geology (Peck, 1993, p. 91).

== Scientific career ==
Doggett Terzaghis final contribution to geological research was published in 1965, and is characterized as her “best known” one by her memorial (Peck, 1993., p. 92). A culmination of all her experiences and knowledge led to the creating of her paper titled “Sources of Error in Joint Surveys,” which appeared in Géotechnique (Peck, 1993., p. 92).

The beginning of Terzaghis first mark on geological history was with her master's thesis on the abnormal dips in the Niagaran reefs near Chicago (Peck, 1993, p. 92). She completed this thesis in 1925, but would continue to work on it throughout her academic career. It was through this continued research that she met her husband and lifelong scientific partner, Karl von Terzaghi, whom she married after receiving her Ph.D. in 1930 (Peck, 1993, p. 92).

Doggett Terzaghis husband had just taken on a role at the Technische Hochschule in Vienna, which sparked an eight-year worldwide geological expedition for the couple (Peck, 1993, p. 92). From 1930 to 1938 both Terzaghi and her husband investigated the conditions for several projects worldwide, all of which were laid out in her memorial from the Geological Society of America (Peck, 1993, p. 91-92).

Doggett Terzaghi traveled with Karl to investigate geological conditions for projects including a 600 ft. arch dam in Sulak Canyon in Daghestan, Soviet Russia; a main irrigation canal through loess and broken limestone in central Asia; a rockfill dam in Bou Hanifia, Algeria; a concrete dam on clay sediments to great depth on the Svir River near Leningrad; and numerous foundations and landslides in Europe (Peck, 1993, p.91).

Karl von Terzaghi is known as the “father of soil mechanics and geotechnical engineering”, so it is no surprise that his pursuits regarding the civil engineering applications of geological research would rub off on his new partner and wife, Doggett (Peck, 1993,. p. 91). Following their return to the United States in 1939, Terzaghi assumed her role as a professor, then eventually a research fellow, at Harvard (Peck, 1993, p. 92). Her days at Harvard saw her cooperating with her husband on his projects, editing and critiquing them, in addition to pursuing her own independent practice and research (Peck, 1993, p. 91).

After Terzaghi agreed to look into the causes of deterioration on one of her husbands older projects, specifically concrete placed on a shipyard, she was published in two technical journals (Peck, 1993, p. 91). She equated the deterioration to weathering, findings which impressed the publishers at the Proceedings of the American Concrete Institute and the Journal of the Boston Society of Civil Engineers (Peck, 1993, p. 91).

Terzaghi's research led to several more opportunities, including an investigation of deteriorating concrete by the Association of American Railroads, research into subsidence after being hired by a chemical plant, and investigating dams (incl. Hogback Dam in Connecticut and Necaxa Dam in Mexico) with her husband (Peck, 1993, p. 92). Many of these opportunities took Terzaghi all over the country and world (Peck, 1993, p. 91).

Terzaghi continued to pursue her research from her master's thesis, which, following her initial discussion with Karl von Terzaghi in 1928, she discovered it could be supplemented and reinforced by integrating the field of soil mechanics into her research (Peck, 1993, p. 91). At around 1931, Tergazhi also published her findings on synergite on the Journal for the Mineralogical Society of America, comparing those findings with similar ones on hematite and gypsum (Tergazhi, n.d, p. 309,). Later, She published the final version in the Journal of Sedimentary Petrology in 1940 (Peck, 1993, p. 91). Within this journal, one of her contributions includes her investigation into the relationship between lime mud's compaction (Tergazhi, 1940, p. 78), concluding that the relationship between lime mud's compressibility and the pressure in which it can withstand is directly proportional (Tergazhi, 1940, p. 89). In the same year, she launched an investigation into Head Harbor Island's rapakivi granite veins (Tergazhi, n.d, 114), finding chemical compounds such as silicon dioxide (Tergazhi, n.d, 115).

== Awards and honours ==
Doggett Terzaghi's publication in the Journal of the Boston Society of Civil Engineers led her to receive the Clemens Herschel Prize of that society in 1950 (Peck, 1993).

Her paper titled “Sources of Error in Joint Surveys,” published in Géotechnique, paired with her outstanding scientific portfolio, earning her an honorary membership in the Association of Engineering Geologists (Peck, 1993). Doggett Terzaghi was the first women ever to be recognized (Peck, 1993).

Her memorial highlights her inclusion into multiple geological societies. Terzaghi was elected to Fellowship in the Geological Society of America in 1948. She was a member of the American Concrete Institute and the Boston Society of Civil Engineers, of which she served as chairman of the Structural Section in 1954-1955 (Peck, 1993).

== Personal life ==
Doggett Terzaghi met her husband, an Austrian geologist named Karl Von Terzaghi, in 1928. He was a professor of civil engineering at the Massachusetts Institute of Technology at the time (Ogilvie, 2003; Peck, 1993). The two grew closer as he helped her develop her thesis for her master's degree in geology (Peck, 1993). They maintained correspondence after a brief dating phase, and kept their relationship even after Karl departed for Austria in 1929 (Karl & Rogers, 2013). They married each other in 1930, in absentia (i.e. when one member of the union is not present) by Cambridge (Karl & Rogers, 2013). Once the arrangements were complete, Terzaghi departed for France to travel with her new husband (Karl & Rogers, 2013). They reunited on June 7, thus embarking on their lifelong partnership in marriage and geological/ engineering research (Karl & Rogers, 2013).

Their academic career began with a worldwide project campaign from 1930 to 1938 (Peck, 1993). On September 5, 1936, Terzaghi gave birth to her first child, a boy whom they named Eric (Peck, 1993). Due to tensions regarding her husband's work and the brewing war in Europe, Terzaghi returned to the U.S. without her husband in 1938, so she could raise her son safely (Karl & Rogers, 2013). Karl was obliged to stay, as a scandal in which a rival geologist attempted to discredit his work left him on damage control (Karl & Rogers, 2013). As well, he was being scouted by the Austrian-German war effort for assistance (Karl & Rogers, 2013).

Following the war, Doggett Terzaghi engaged in many collaborations with her husband, primarily taking on an editorial role, while also engaging in her own independent work (Peck, 1993).

In May 1941, they had their second child whom they named Margaret. (Peck, 1993; Rogers & Karl, 2013).
