= Arthur Casagrande =

Soil mechanic engineer and collaborator of Terzaghi

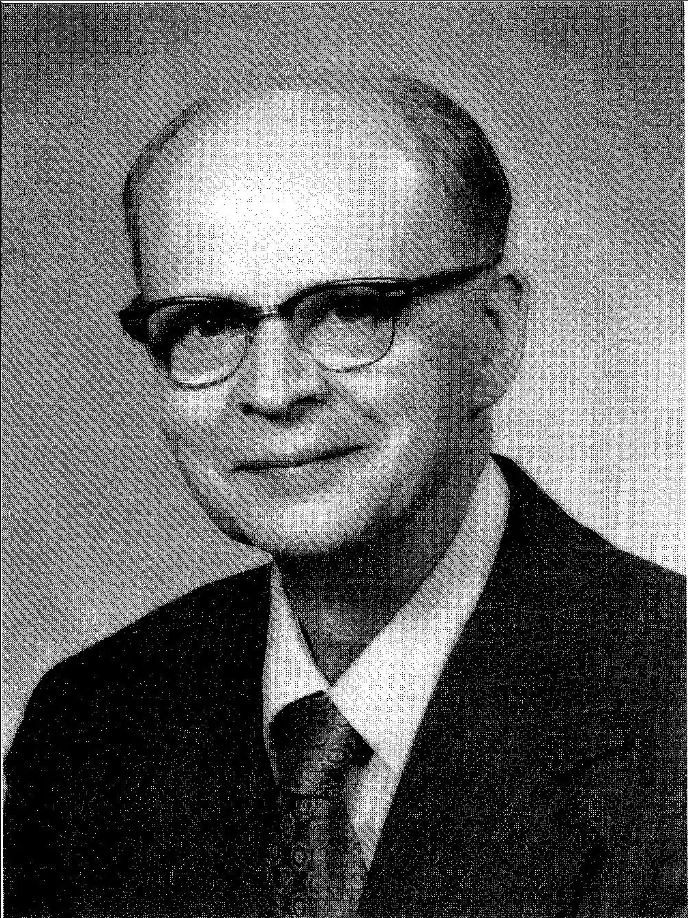
- Arthur Casagrande
- Born: August 28, 1902; Ajdovščina, Austria-Hungary
- Died: September 6, 1981 (aged 79)
- Occupations: Civil engineer, Geotechnical engineer

Arthur Casagrande (August 28, 1902 – September 6, 1981) was an American civil engineer born in Austria-Hungary who made important contributions to the fields of engineering geology and geotechnical engineering during its infancy. Renowned for his ingenious designs of soil testing apparatus and fundamental research on seepage and soil liquefaction, he is also credited for developing the soil mechanics teaching programme at Harvard University during the early 1930s that has since been modelled in many universities around the world.

== Biography ==
Casagrande was born in Ajdovščina, in present-day Slovenia, at that time part of Austria-Hungary. He moved to Trieste after attending his first year in school in Linz. When reaching the age to enter secondary school he entered the Realschule, where students are typically expected to take on an apprenticeship and pursue a technical career upon graduating. The decision to attend the Realschule was chiefly influenced by his maternal forebears, many of whom coming from mechanical and chemical engineering backgrounds. He graduated from the Technische Hochschule (TH) in Vienna with a civil engineering degree in 1924, after which he carried on working there as a full-time assistant to Professor Schaffernak in the hydraulics laboratory.

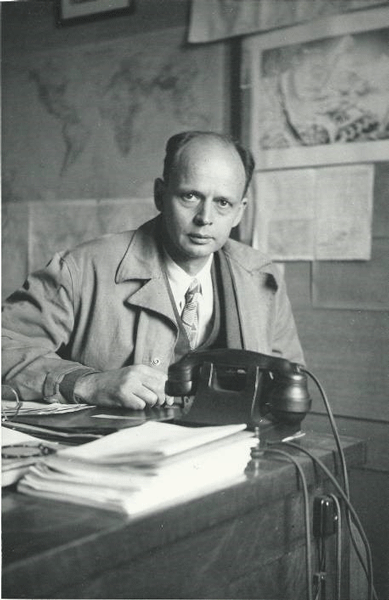

Following the dissolution of Austria-Hungary after World War I, there was little construction work around, leaving employment scant prospects in the civil engineering field. When Casagrande's father died in 1924, the duty of supporting the financial burden of the entire family, together with a strong desire to engage in major civil engineering projects, prompted him to take the gamble of moving to the United States, a decision that was not supported by his mother and professor. Casagrande stayed in a YMCA hostel for ten days after arriving in New York in 1926, and decided to go to New Jersey and work as a draftsman for a few months. While visiting the Massachusetts Institute of Technology for a job interview, he met Karl Terzaghi who had only just arrived, and was immediately offered the job opportunity to work as his private assistant.

From 1926 to 1932, Casagrande worked as a research assistant with the US Bureau of Public Roads, assigned to MIT, where he assisted Terzaghi in his numerous research projects directed towards improving apparatus and techniques for soil testing. When Terzaghi took up a professorship at Vienna in 1929 after a short stint at MIT, Casagrande traveled with him to help him set up the soil mechanics laboratory that would later become one of the most famous research centers in soil mechanics. He also capitalized on the touring opportunity by visiting all soil mechanics laboratories in Europe at the time. When he returned to MIT a few months later, he had gained a thorough knowledge of the state-of-the-art in this field. While at MIT, he developed the liquid limit apparatus, the hydrometer test, the horizontal capillary test, the odometer apparatus, and the shear box, all of which still form the prototypes for the ones in use today. He was also a pioneer in the US for conducting the triaxial shear test and was one of the first persons to study the volume changes of soil during shear.

Aided by his latest advances in experimental techniques and apparatus, Casagrande was able to make fundamental contributions to the understanding of soil mechanics. He was among the first to recognize that change in pore pressure developed during undrained shearing. He also pointed out the significant difference in mechanical characteristics between undisturbed and remolded clay. The common procedures in use today for identifying the preconsolidation pressure in an overconsolidated soil were also due to Casagrande. In relation to his work on Atterberg limits, the "A-line" on plasticity charts may well be named after him.

In 1932, Casagrande moved to Harvard University where he would later be promoted to a newly created chair of soil mechanics and foundation engineering in 1946. There he rapidly established a school of postgraduate teaching and research that would see the number of students steadily grow from 12 in 1932 to over 80 after World War II. At one stage during 1942–44, Casagrande went on to train a total of approximately 400 army officers on the soil mechanics aspects of airfield construction through a series of intensive four-week programmes at the request of the Army Corps of Engineers. Even though Terzaghi would later join Harvard (with the assistance of Casagrande) from Vienna out of concerns on the turbulent political landscape in Europe, Casagrande was effectively alone in the soil mechanics section because of Terzaghi's many periods of absence (Terzaghi would often be away to the University of Illinois collaborating with his close friend Ralph Peck) and disdain of administrative duties. The successful soil mechanics and foundation engineering programme at Harvard was hence often credited to Casagrande, and its particular emphasis on laboratory courses and seepage being an integral part of the curriculum would later form the basis of similar courses around the world.

Casagrande was also credited for organizing the first ever International Conference on Soil Mechanics and Foundation Engineering in 1936, which Terzaghi considered to be too much of a gamble given the early stage in soil mechanics at that time. The conference however turned out to be a success - it led to the establishment of the International Society for Soil Mechanics and Geotechnical Engineering - and has legitimately established soil mechanics as an essential part of civil engineering. Alec Skempton, another early pioneer in the field, would later refer to the time between the publication of Erdbaumechanik (Soil Mechanics) by Terzaghi in 1925 and the first International Conference as the vital formative period of modern soil mechanics.

Of all the consulting projects he was involved in practice, Casagrande was well known for his work in the construction and failure investigation of earth dams. Casagrande's passionate interests in earth dams can be seen in the extensive research work he has carried out on seepage as well as soil liquefaction. It was also through the study commissioned by the Corps of Engineers (who after WWII became concerned about the influence of a possible atomic blast on the stability of embankments of the Panama Canal) that led Casagrande to become one of the first persons in the world to investigate the dynamic strength of soils. Even though the word "liquefaction" was first used by Casagrande in the soil mechanics literature, he considered it to be inappropriate for describing the effects of earthquake loading or cyclic loading in building up pore pressures and deformations in sands (which is effectively the modern notion of liquefaction). Casagrande strenuously insisted that the definition of liquefaction should be reserved for soil exhibiting drastic strain-softening which results in an almost flow-type behavior.

== Awards ==
Casagrande won many awards throughout his career, including being named the first ever Rankine Lecturer by the British Geotechnical Association as well as a Terzaghi Lecturer by ASCE. A number of awards have been established in his honor including the Arthur Casagrande Professional Development Award.
