= Karl von Terzaghi =

Austrian-American geotechnical engineer (1883-1963)

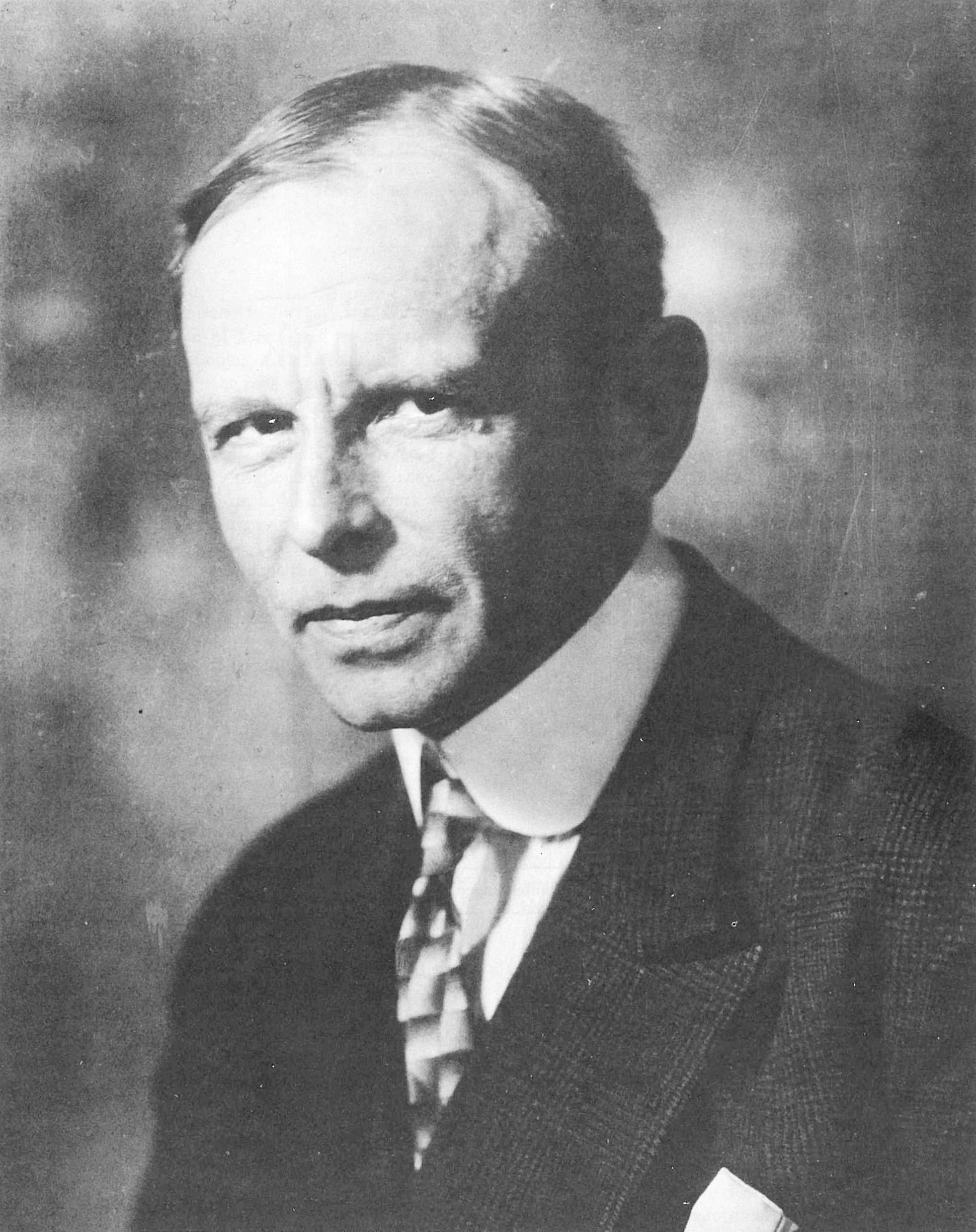
- Karl Terzaghi (1926)
- Born: 2 October 1883; Prague, Austria-Hungary
- Died: 25 October 1963 (aged 80); Winchester, Massachusetts, United States of America
- Education: TU Graz
- Spouses: Olga Byloff; Ruth Dogget Terzaghi
- Children: A child (b. 1912, adopted in Mexico), Vera Terzaghi, Eric Terzaghi, Margaret Terzaghi-Howe
- Parent(s): Anton Terzaghi and Amalia Eberle
- Awards: Norman Medal (x4); Frank P. Brown Medal (1946); Doctor Honoris Causa, National Autonomous University of Mexico (1951)
- Scientific career
- Fields: Geology; Geotechnical engineering
- Workplaces: Istanbul Technical University; Robert College; Massachusetts Institute of Technology; TU Wien; Harvard University
- Notable students: Arthur Casagrande; Ralph Brazelton Peck; Cinna Lomnitz

Karl von Terzaghi (2 October 1883 – 25 October 1963) was an Austrian-American mechanical engineer, geotechnical engineer, and geologist known as the "father of soil mechanics and geotechnical engineering".

== Early life ==
In 1883, he was born the first child of Army Lieutenant-Colonel Anton von Terzaghi, of Italian origin, and Amalia Eberle in Prague, in what is now the Czech Republic. Upon his father's retirement from the army, the family moved to Graz, Austria.

At the age of 10, Terzaghi was sent to a military boarding school, where he developed an interest in astronomy and geography. At the age of 14, Terzaghi entered a different military school, in Hranice, the Crown of Bohemia. He was an excellent student, especially in geometry and mathematics, and graduated with honors at 17.

In 1900, Terzaghi entered the Technical University in Graz to study mechanical engineering, where he also developed an interest in theoretical mechanics. He was nearly expelled at one point but ended up graduating with honors in 1904. Terzaghi then fulfilled his compulsory one-year military service. While fulfilling his military obligations, Terzaghi translated a popular English geology field manual into German and greatly expanded it. He returned to the university for one year and combined the study of geology with courses on subjects such as highway and railway engineering. Shortly afterward, he published his first academic paper on the geology of terraces in southern Styria.

== Early professional years ==
His first job was as a junior design engineer for the firm Adolph von Pittel, Vienna. The firm was becoming more involved in the relatively new field of hydroelectric power generation, and Karl became involved in the geological problems the firm faced. His responsibilities quickly increased, and by 1908, he was managing a construction site, workers, and the design and construction of steel-reinforced structures. He embarked on a project to construct a hydroelectric dam in Croatia. For six months in Russia, he developed some novel graphical methods for the design of industrial tanks, which he submitted as a thesis for his PhD at the university.

In 1912 he travelled to the United States and undertook an engineering tour of major dam construction sites in the West. He used the opportunity to gather reports and firsthand knowledge of the problems of many different projects, and he returned to Austria in December 1913. When World War I broke out, he found himself drafted into the army as an officer directing a 250-man engineering battalion. He eventually led 1,000 men, faced combat in Serbia, and witnessed the fall of Belgrade. After a short stint managing an airfield, he became a professor at the Royal Ottoman College of Engineering in Istanbul (now Istanbul Technical University).

There, he began a rigorous study of the properties of soils in an engineering context. Both his measurements and his analysis of the force on retaining walls were first published in English in 1919, and they were quickly recognized as an important new contribution to the scientific understanding of the fundamental behavior of soils.

After the war, he was forced to resign his post at the university but managed to find a new post at Robert College in Istanbul, where he switched his teaching language from French to English. He began studying experimental and quantitative aspects of the permeability of soils to water and produced theories to explain the observations. He invented novel equipment as part of the work. In 1924 he published Erdbaumechanik auf Bodenphysikalischer Grundlage (The Mechanics of Earth Construction Based on Soil Physics) which would have a profound impact on the field. That resulted in a job offer from the Massachusetts Institute of Technology (MIT) which he accepted.

== Later years ==
One of his first tasks in the United States was to bring his work to the attention of engineers. He proceeded to do this by writing a series of articles for the Engineering News Record, which were published in winter 1925, then as a small book in 1926. He found the facilities at MIT abominable and had to deal with obstruction from the administration. Brushing the obstacles aside, he once more set up a new laboratory geared towards making measurements on soils with instruments of his own devising. He entered a new phase of prolific publication and a rapidly growing and lucrative involvement as an engineering consultant on many large-scale projects.

In 1927, Aurelia Schober Plath, who would become the mother of the poet Sylvia Plath, worked as a secretary for Terzaghi. She was of Austrian descent and worked for him by translating a handwritten manuscript in German, dealing with new principles of soil mechanics. After work, they would have dinner together when Terzaghi's conversation led her to Greek drama, Russian literature, the works of Hermann Hesse, the poems of Rainer Maria Rilke as well as the writings of great world philosophers. She claims the experience affected her for the rest of her life and that she "realized how narrow my world had been and that self-education could be and should be an exciting lifelong adventure. It was the beginning of my dream for the ideal education of the children I hoped some day to have."

From 1926 to 1932, Arthur Casagrande, another pioneer of soil mechanics and geotechnical engineering, worked as Terzaghi's private assistant at MIT.

Terzaghi was much in demand as a dinner companion and was a fascinating conversationalist. His striking good looks and evident power was very attractive to women. In 1928, he met the young Harvard doctoral student in geology, Ruth Dogget, and fell deeply in love.

That year, Terzaghi was finally fed up with MIT and its president and determined to return to Europe. He accepted a chair at the Vienna Technische Hochshule in the winter of 1929. He married Ruth, who became his editor and collaborator as well. A short consulting trip to the Soviet Union before taking up his post horrified him, and he came to oppose the communist system there, as a regime exemplified by its brutality and chaos. Using Austria as his base, he traveled ceaselessly throughout Europe, consulting, lecturing and making new professional contacts and collaborations. His teaching workload was now relatively light so he continued his experimental investigations and became especially interested in the problems of the settling of foundations, and of grouting. He began writing the manuscript for a much updated and expanded version of Erdbaumechanik, now set for two volumes. However, the political turmoil in Austria began to interfere with his work, and in 1935, he decided to take a leave from Vienna from 1935 to 1936.

He began his sabbatical with a short trip to consult with Todt and the architects of the proposed grandiose plans for immense buildings at the Nazi's Party Day Rally site in Nuremberg. That led to a conflict over the best way to lay a sound foundation, which led to a discussion with Hitler himself, who took an intense interest in all details of the architecture. Terzaghi then returned to America, where he gave a plenary lecture at the International Conference on Soil Mechanics at Harvard University (the event led to the establishment of the International Society for Soil Mechanics and Geotechnical Engineering; Terzaghi was its first president). He made a lecture tour of many other universities but discovered that prospects for employment were dim. He returned to Vienna in September 1936, shortly after the birth of his first son Eric.

In Vienna, he returned to a nasty professional and political controversy (including an acrimonious dispute with Paul Fillunger), which he overcame only with some difficulty. He memorably stated, "The Fatherland denoted me as a Nazi, the Nazis as a Bolshevik, and the Bolsheviks as a conservative idealist. Certainly only one of the three could be right, and that one is the Bolsheviks." He escaped from Vienna frequently by extended consulting trips to major construction projects in England, Italy, France, Algeria, and Latvia, adding greatly to his engineering experience.

In July 1937 'a large part of the completed bank [of the Chingford Reservoir construction] slid gracefully into the reservoir causing confusion, alarm and despondency'. Robert Wynne-Edwards of Mowlem flew to Paris to ask for Terzaghi's advice and from that moment geotechnical investigations and soil mechanics began to be crucial methods used in United Kingdom engineering site investigations.

In 1938, he emigrated to the United States and took up a post at Harvard University. By the end of the war, he had consulted on the Chicago subway system, Newport News Shipways construction, and raising The Normandy, among others. He became an American citizen in March 1943. He was awarded the Frank P. Brown Medal in 1946. He remained as a part-timer at Harvard University until his retirement in 1953, at the mandatory age of 70.

In 1950, he published work on the geological aspects of soft ground tunnelling including a classification system for the assessment of different soil types.

In July 1954, he became the chairman of the Consulting Board for the construction of the Aswan High Dam. He resigned that post in 1959 after coming into conflict with the Soviet engineers in charge of the project but continued to consult on various hydroelectric projects, especially in British Columbia. He died in 1963, and his ashes were interred in South Waterford, Maine, near "Bear's Corner", the family retreat.

== Legacy ==
The American Society of Civil Engineers established in 1960 the Karl Terzaghi Award to an "author of outstanding contributions to knowledge in the fields of soil mechanics, subsurface and earthwork engineering, and subsurface and earthwork construction." The Terzaghi and Peck Library, which is managed by the Norwegian Geotechnical Institute, in Oslo, Norway, holds an extensive collection of his papers.

In 1963, The American Society of Civil Engineers' Soil Mechanics and Foundations Division, along with and the friends of Terzaghi, established the Karl Terzaghi Lecture. The first lecture was delivered by Ralph B. Peck, a student of Terzaghi's, in 1963. In 2016, the Geo-Institute of the American Society of Civil Engineers started observing Terzaghi Day, held every year on Terzaghi's birthday.

In 1983, the Austrian Postal Service issued a commemorative stamp to mark the centenary of Terzaghi's birth. The Mission Dam in British Columbia, Canada, was renamed in his honor as the Terzaghi Dam in 1965.

As Professor Goodman describes him, Karl Terzaghi was a remarkable man and an impassioned engineer. As he put it himself, "All the modest achievements which I have to my credit can be described by a simple formula… Guided by common sense and casual observations, I recognized weak points in traditional procedures and tried to make them less weak. Sometimes I failed, but usually I succeeded."

== See also ==
- Consolidation (soil)
- Effective stress
- Engineering geology
- Geotechnical engineering
- Retaining wall
- Rock mass classifications
- Soil mechanics
- Subsidence
- Terzaghi's principle

== Books ==
- Terzaghi, K., Theoretical Soil Mechanics, John Wiley and Sons, New York (1943) ISBN 0-471-85305-4.
- Terzaghi, K., Peck, R. B. and Mesri, G., Soil Mechanics in Engineering Practice, 3rd Ed. Wiley-Interscience (1996) ISBN 0-471-08658-4.
- Terzaghi, K., "Large Retaining Wall Tests", Engineering News Record Feb.1, 8 March 19 April (1934).
- Terzaghi, K., From theory to practice in soil mechanics;: Selections from the writings of Karl Terzaghi, with bibliography and contributions on his life and achievements John Wiley and Sons (1967).
- Terzaghi, K., Proctor, R. V. and White, T. L., "Rock Tunneling with Steel Supports," Commercial Shearing and Stamping Co. (1946).
- Terzaghi, K., American Society of Civil Engineers, "Karl Terzaghi: The Engineer as an Artist" American Society of Civil Engineers (1999) from http://ascelibrary.org/doi/book/10.1061/9780784403648
- Terzaghi, K., American Society of Civil Engineers, "Terzaghi Lectures, 1974-1982," American Society of Civil Engineers (1986) ISBN 0-87262-532-X.
