= Soil test =

Analysis of soil

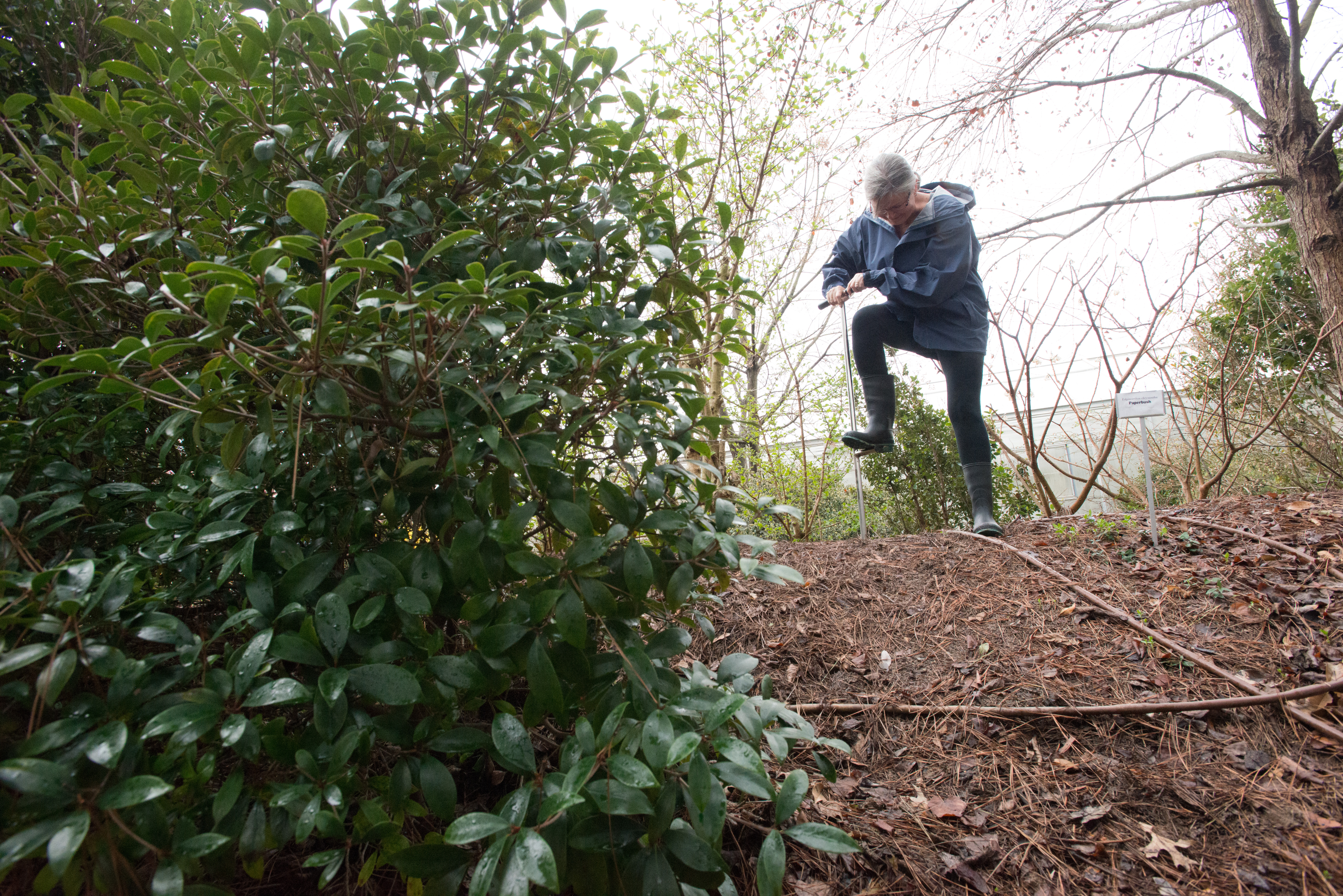
A horticulture student taking a soil sample in a garden near Lawrenceville, Georgia

A soil test is a laboratory or in-situ analysis to determine the chemical, physical or biological characteristics of a soil. Possibly the most widely conducted soil tests are those performed to estimate the plant-available concentrations of nutrients in order to provide fertilizer recommendations in agriculture. In geotechnical engineering, soil tests can be used to determine the current physical state of the soil, the seepage properties, the shear strength and the deformation properties of the soil. Other soil tests may be used in geochemical or ecological investigations.

== Agricultural soil tests ==
In agriculture, a soil test commonly refers to the analysis of a soil sample to determine nutrient content, composition, and other characteristics such as the acidity. A soil test can determine fertility, or the expected growth potential of the soil which indicates nutrient deficiencies, potential toxicities from excessive fertility and inhibitions from the presence of non-essential trace minerals. The test is used to mimic the function of roots to assimilate minerals. The expected rate of growth is modeled by the Law of the Maximum.

Labs, such as those at Iowa State and Colorado State University, recommend that a soil test contains 10-20 sample points for every 40 acres (160,000 m^{2}) of field. Tap water or chemicals can change the composition of the soil, and may need to be tested separately. As soil nutrients vary with depth and soil components change with time, the depth and timing of a sample may also affect results.

Composite sampling can be performed by combining soil from several locations prior to analysis. This is a common procedure, but should be used judiciously to avoid skewing results. This procedure must be done so that government sampling requirements are met. A reference map should be created to record the location and quantity of field samples in order to properly interpret test results.

=== Geographic distribution of samples for precision agriculture ===
In precision agriculture, soil samples may be geolocated using GPS technology in order to estimate the geospatial distribution of nutrients in the sampled area. The geolocated samples are collected using a distribution and resolution that allows for the estimation of the geospatial variability of the soil area where the crop will be grown. Many different distributions and resolutions are used, depending upon many factors including the goals of the geospatial nutrient analysis and cost of sample collection and analysis.

For example, in the United States corn and soybean growing regions a grid distribution with a resolution of 2.5 acres per grid (one sample for each 2.5 acre grid) is offered by many precision agriculture soil test service providers. This is generally referred to as grid soil testing.

=== Storage, handling, and moving ===
Soil chemistry changes over time, as biological and which chemical processes break down or combine compounds over time. These processes change once the soil is removed from its natural ecosystem (flora and fauna that penetrate the sampled area) and environment (temperature, moisture, and solar light/radiation cycles). As a result, the chemical composition analysis accuracy can be improved if the soil is analyzed soon after its extraction — usually within a relative time period of 24 hours. The chemical changes in the soil can be slowed during storage and transportation by freezing it. Air drying can also preserve the soil sample for many months.

=== Lab testing ===
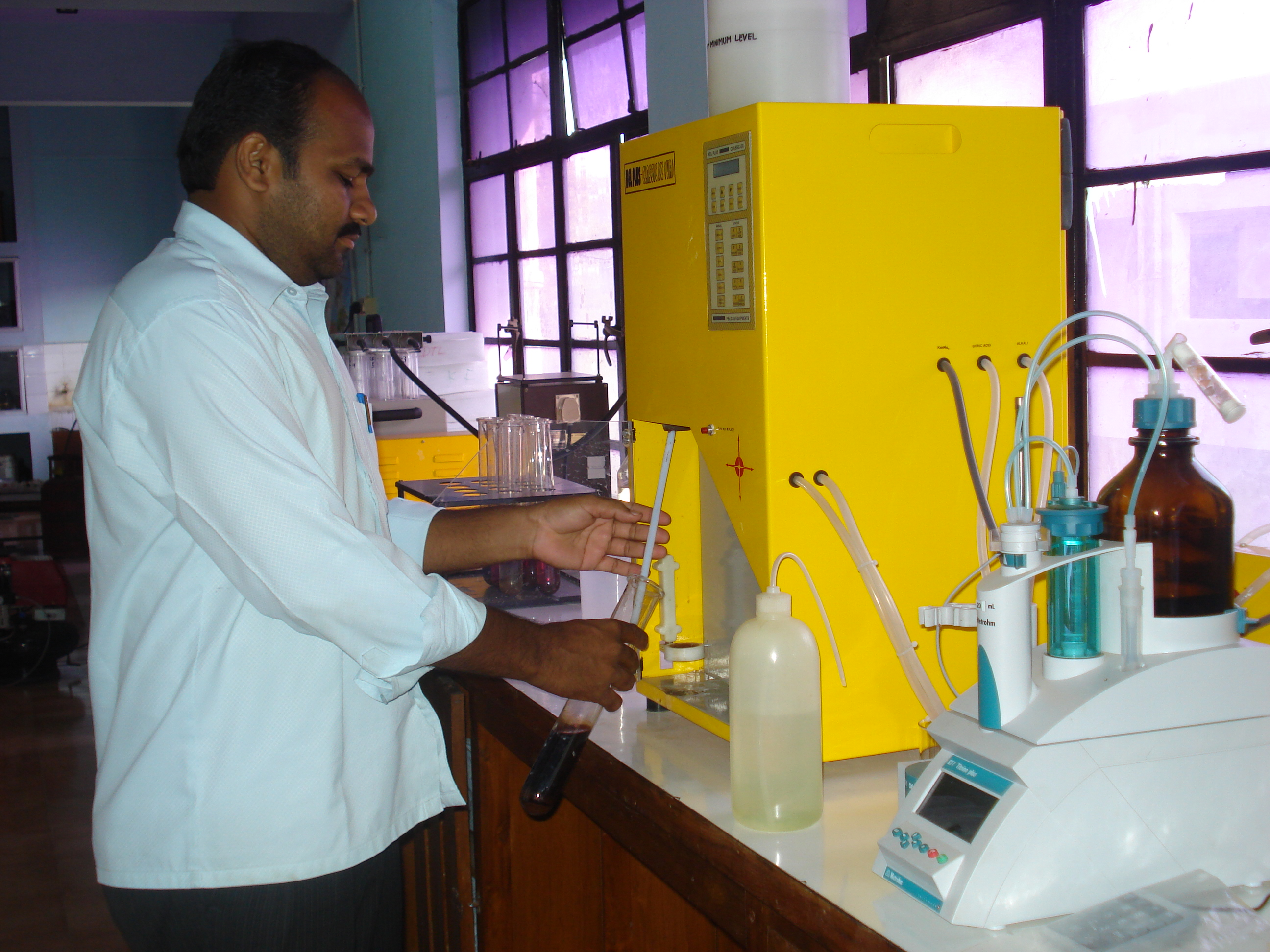
Soil testing in progress

Soil testing is often performed by commercial labs that offer a variety of tests, targeting groups of compounds and minerals. Laboratory tests often check for plant nutrients in three categories:

- Major nutrients: nitrogen, phosphorus, and potassium
- Secondary nutrients: sulfur, calcium, magnesium
- Minor nutrients: iron, manganese, copper, zinc, boron, molybdenum, chlorine

The amount of plant-available phosphorus is most often measured with a chemical extraction method, and different countries have different standard methods. Just in Europe, more than 10 different soil phosphorus tests are currently in use and the results from these different tests are not directly comparable.

Do-it-yourself kits usually only test for the three "major nutrients", and for soil acidity or pH level. Do-it-yourself kits are often sold at farming cooperatives, university labs, private labs, and some hardware and gardening stores. Electrical meters that measure pH, water content, and sometimes nutrient content of the soil are also available at many hardware stores. Laboratory tests are more accurate than tests with do-it-yourself kits and electrical meters.

In order to avoid complex and expensive analytical techniques, prediction based on regression equations relating to more easily measurable parameters can be provided by pedotransfer functions. For instance, soil bulk density can be predicted using easily measured soil properties such as soil texture, pH and organic matter.

Soil testing is used to facilitate fertilizer composition and dosage selection for land employed in both agricultural and horticultural industries.

Prepaid mail-in kits for soil and ground water testing are available to facilitate the packaging and delivery of samples to a laboratory. Similarly, in 2004, laboratories began providing fertilizer recommendations along with the soil composition report.

Lab tests are more accurate and often utilize very precise flow injection technology (or Near InfraRed (NIR) scanning). In addition, lab tests frequently include professional interpretation of results and recommendations. Provisory statements included in a lab report may outline any anomalies, exceptions, and shortcomings in the sampling, analytical process or results.

Some laboratories analyze for all 13 mineral nutrients and a dozen non-essential, potentially toxic minerals utilizing the "universal soil extractant" (ammonium bicarbonate DTPA).

== Engineering soil testing ==
In geotechnical engineering, a soil test can be used to determine the physical characteristics of a soil, such as its water content, void ratio or bulk density. Soil testing can also provide information related to the shear strength, rate of consolidation and permeability of the soil. The following is a non-exhaustive list of engineering soil tests.

- Water content
- Specific gravity
- Grain size analysis (sieve analysis or hydrometer method)
- Atterberg limits
- Free swell index
- Swelling pressure
- Dry density
- Triaxial shear test
- Direct shear test
- Relative density
- Oedometer test for consolidation
- California bearing ratio (CBR)
- Permeability tests (constant-head, falling-head, etc.)
- Vane shear test

== Soil contaminants ==
Common mineral soil contaminants include arsenic, barium, cadmium, copper, mercury, lead, and zinc.

Lead is a particularly dangerous soil component. The following table from the University of Minnesota categorizes typical soil concentration levels and their associated health risks.

Children and pregnant women should avoid contact with soil estimated total lead levels above 300 ppm
Lead Level	Extracted lead (ppm)	Estimated total lead (ppm)
Low	<43	<500
Medium	43-126	500-1000
High	126-480	1000-3000
Very high	>480	>3000

The following is a non-exhaustive list of recommendations to limit exposure to lead in garden soils:

1. Locate gardens away from old painted structures and heavily traveled roads
2. Give planting preferences to fruiting crops (tomatoes, squash, peas, sunflowers, corn, etc.)
3. Incorporate organic materials such as finished compost, humus, and peat moss
4. Lime soil as recommended by soil test (a pH of 6.5 minimizes lead availability)
5. Discard old and outer leaves before eating leafy vegetables; peel root crops; wash all produce
6. Keep dust to a minimum by maintaining a mulched and/or moist soil surface

== See also ==
- Base-cation saturation ratio
- Fertilizer
- Geotechnical investigation
- Liming (soil)
- Plant tissue test
- SESL Australia
