= Preconsolidation pressure =

Maximum stress soil has experience in the past

Preconsolidation pressure is the maximum effective vertical overburden stress that a particular soil sample has sustained in the past. This quantity is important in geotechnical engineering, particularly for finding the expected settlement of foundations and embankments. Alternative names for the preconsolidation pressure are preconsolidation stress, pre-compression stress, pre-compaction stress, and preload stress. A soil is called overconsolidated if the current effective stress acting on the soil is less than the historical maximum.

The preconsolidation pressure can help determine the largest overburden pressure that can be exerted on a soil without irrecoverable volume change. This type of volume change is important for understanding shrinkage behavior, crack and structure formation and resistance to shearing stresses. Previous stresses and other changes in a soil's history are preserved within the soil's structure. If a soil is loaded beyond this point the soil is unable to sustain the increased load and the structure will break down. This breakdown can cause a number of different things depending on the type of soil and its geologic history.

Preconsolidation pressure cannot be measured directly, but can be estimated using a number of different strategies. Samples taken from the field are subjected to a variety of tests, like the constant rate of strain test (CRS) or the incremental loading test (IL). These tests can be costly due to expensive equipment and the long period of time they require. Each sample must be undisturbed and can only undergo one test with satisfactory results. It is important to execute these tests precisely to ensure an accurate resulting plot. There are various methods for determining the preconsolidation pressure from lab data. The data is usually arranged on a semilog plot of the effective stress (frequently represented as σ'vc) versus the void ratio. This graph is commonly called the e log p curve or the consolidation curve.

== Methods ==
The preconsolidation pressure can be estimated in a number of different ways but not measured directly. It is useful to know the range of expected values depending on the type of soil being analyzed. For example, in samples with natural moisture content at the liquid limit (liquidity index of 1), preconsolidation ranges between about 0.1 and 0.8 tsf, depending on soil sensitivity (defined as the ratio of undisturbed peak undrained shear strength to totally remolded undrained shear strength). For natural moisture at the plastic limit (liquidity index equal to zero), preconsolidation ranges from about 12 to 25 tsf.

See Atterberg limits for information about soil properties like liquidity index and liquid limit.

=== Arthur Casagrande's graphical method ===
The consolidation curve for a saturated clay showing the procedure for finding the preconsolidation pressure.

Using a consolidation curve:(Casagrande 1936)

1. Choose by eye the point of maximum curvature on the consolidation curve.
2. Draw a horizontal line from this point.
3. Draw a line tangent to the curve at the point found in part 1.
4. Bisect the angle made from the horizontal line in part 2 and the tangent line in part 3.
5. Extend the "straight portion" of the virgin compression curve (high effective stress, low void ratio: almost vertical on the right of the graph) up to the bisector line in part 4.

The point where the lines in part 4 and part 5 intersect is the preconsolidation pressure.

Gregory et al. proposed an analytical method to calculate preconsolidation stress that avoids subjective interpretations of the location of the maximum curvature point (i.e. Minimum radius of curvature). Tomás et al. used this method to calculate the preconsolidation pressure of 139 undisturbed soil samples to generate preconsolidation pressure maps of the Vega Baja of the Segura (Spain).

=== Estimation of the "most probable" preconsolidation pressure ===
Using a consolidation curve, intersect the horizontal portion of the recompression curve and a line tangent to the compression curve. This point is within the range of probable preconsolidation pressures. It can be used in calculations that require less accuracy or if a rough estimate is all that is required.

See "Modeling Volume Change and Mechanical Properties with Hydraulic Models," from the Soil Science Society of America (link in references) for a more involved mathematical model based on Casagrande's method combining principles from soil mechanics and hydraulics.

=== Profiling of overconsolidation ratio in clays by field vane ===
The field vane (FV) has traditionally been utilized to obtain profiles of undrained shear strength in soft to medium clays. After some 40 years of experience with FV results, it has been suggested that empirical correction factors be applied to the FV data to account for the effects of strain rate, anisotropy, and disturbance on measured shear strengths. As an additional use of the device, the FV may be calibrated at each site to develop profiles of overconsolidation ratio (OCR) with depth by $OCR=a_{FV} [\frac{c_{uv}}{\sigma_{\mathrm{v0}}^/}]$, where $a_{FV} = 22 (PI)^{-0,48}$ (PI, %).

== Mechanisms causing preconsolidation ==
Various different factors can cause a soil to approach its preconsolidation pressure:

- Change in total stress due to removal of overburden can cause preconsolidation pressure in a soil. For example, removal of structures or glaciation would cause a change in total stress that would have this effect.
- Change in pore water pressure: A change in water table elevation, Artesian pressures, deep pumping or flow into tunnels, and desiccation due to surface drying or plant life can bring soil to its preconsolidation pressure.
- Change in soil structure due to aging (secondary compression): Over time, soil will consolidate even after high pressures from loading and pore water pressure have been depleted.
- Environmental changes: Changes in pH, temperature, and salt concentration can cause a soil to approach its preconsolidation pressure.
- Chemical weathering: Different types of chemical weathering will cause preconsolidation pressure. Precipitation, cementing agents, and ion exchange are a few examples.

== Uses ==
Preconsolidation pressure is used in many calculations of soil properties essential for structural analysis and soil mechanics. One of the primary uses is to predict settlement of a structure after loading. This is required for any construction project such as new buildings, bridges, large roads and railroad tracks. All of these require site evaluation before construction. Preparing a site for construction requires an initial compression of the soil to prepare for foundation to be added. It is important to know the preconsolidation pressure because it will help to determine the amount of loading that is appropriate for the site. It will also help to determine whether recompression (after excavation), if the conditions allow, soil can exhibit volumetric expansion, recompression, due to the removal of load conditions need to be considered.

== See also ==
- Geotechnical engineering
- Compaction (geology)
- Soil compaction
- Settlement (soils)
- Soil Mechanics
