= Geotechnical investigation =

Study of properties of soil earthworks

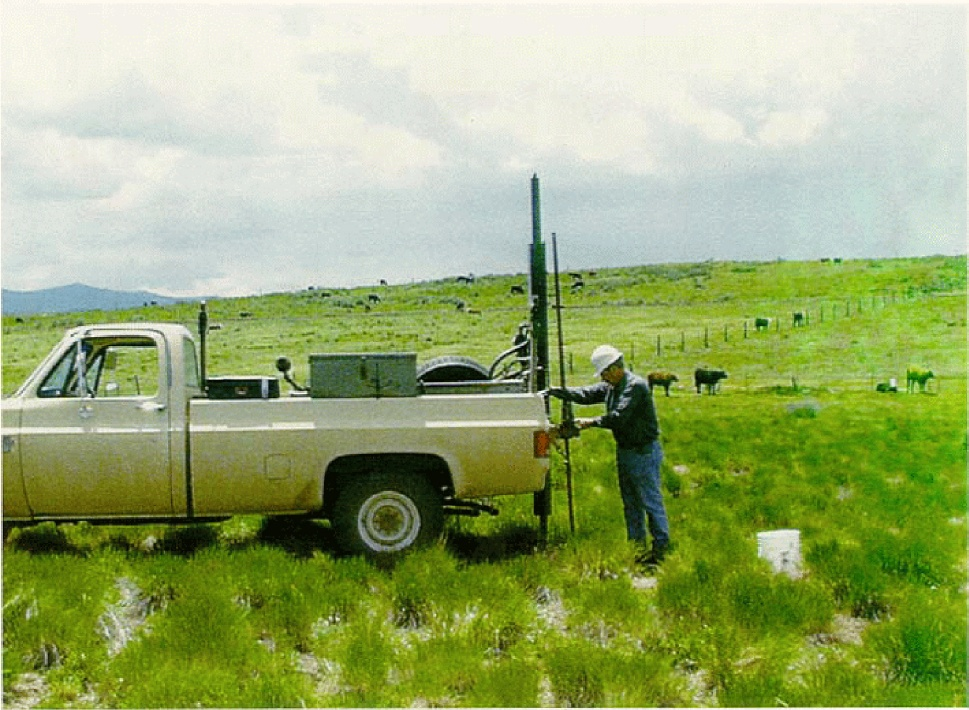
A USBR soil scientist advances a Giddings Probe direct push soil sampler.

Geotechnical investigations are performed by geotechnical engineers or engineering geologists to obtain information on the physical properties of soil earthworks and foundations for proposed structures and for repair of distress to earthworks and structures caused by subsurface conditions; this type of investigation is called a site investigation. Geotechnical investigations are also used to measure the thermal resistance of soils or backfill materials required for underground transmission lines, oil and gas pipelines, radioactive waste disposal, and solar thermal storage facilities. A geotechnical investigation will include surface exploration and subsurface exploration of a site. Sometimes, geophysical methods are used to obtain data about sites. Subsurface exploration usually involves soil sampling and laboratory tests of the soil samples retrieved.

Geotechnical investigations are very important before any structure can be built, ranging from a single house to a large warehouse, a multi-storey building, and infrastructure projects like bridges, high-speed rail, and metros.

Surface exploration can include geological mapping, geophysical methods, and photogrammetry, or it can be as simple as a geotechnical professional walking around on the site to observe the physical conditions at the site. To obtain information about the soil conditions below the surface, some form of subsurface exploration is required. Methods of observing the soils below the surface, obtaining samples, and determining physical properties of the soils and rocks include test pits, trenching (particularly for locating faults and slide planes), borings, and in situ tests. These can also be used to identify contamination in soils prior to development in order to avoid negative environmental impacts.

== Soil sampling ==
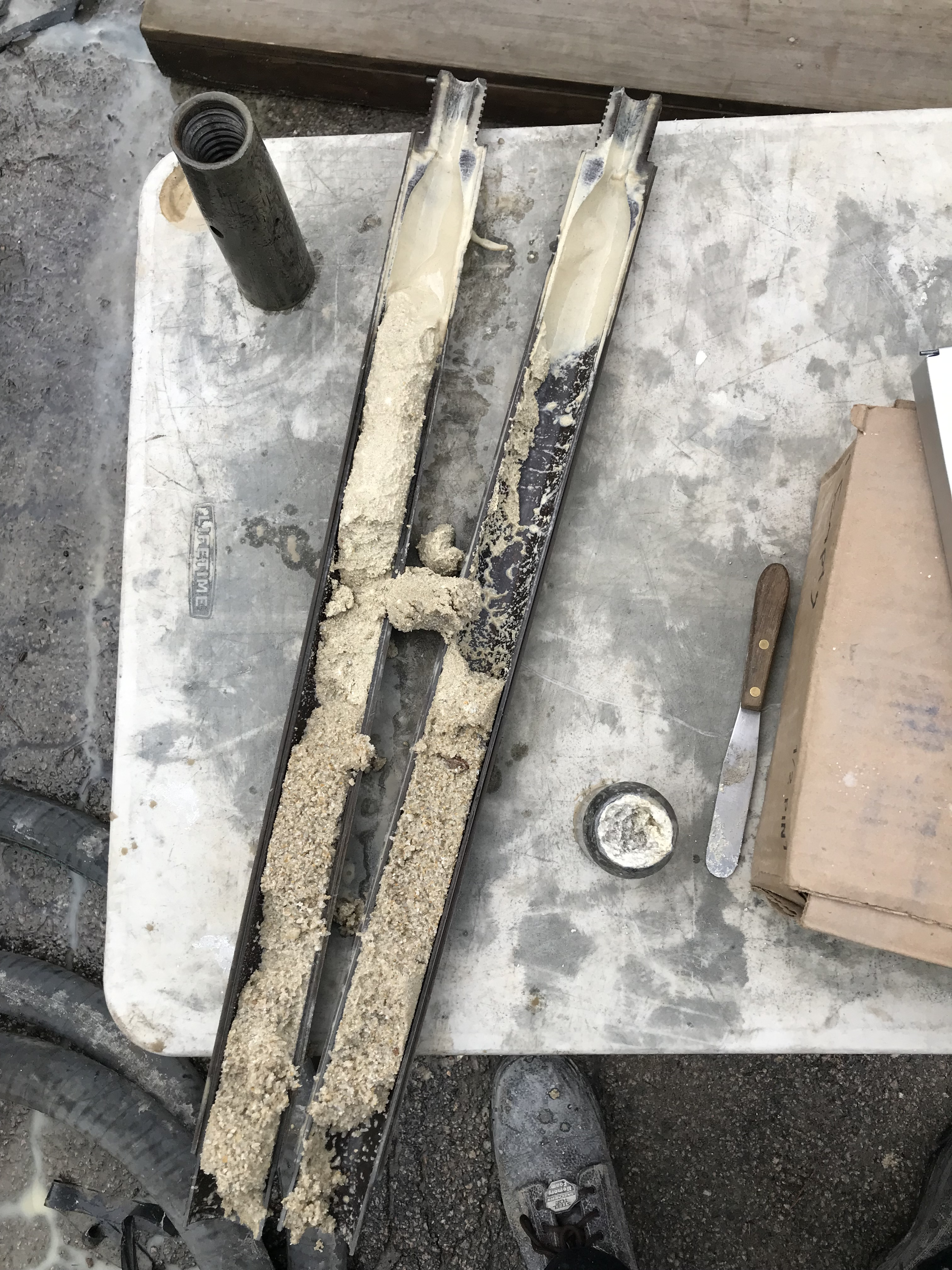
A soil sample recovered from a test boring using a split spoon sampler

Borings come in two main varieties: large diameter and small diameter. Large-diameter borings are rarely used because of safety concerns and expense but are sometimes used to allow a geologist or an engineer to visually and manually examine the soil and rock stratigraphy in-situ. Small-diameter borings are frequently used to allow a geologist or engineer to examine soil or rock cuttings or to retrieve samples at depth using soil samplers, and to perform in-place soil tests. Recommendations for the spacing and depth of investigations are presented in annex B.3 of Eurocode 7 - Geotechnical design - Part 2.

Soil samples are often categorized as being either disturbed or undisturbed; however, "undisturbed" samples are not truly undisturbed. A disturbed sample is one in which the structure of the soil has been changed sufficiently that tests of structural properties of the soil will not be representative of in-situ conditions, and only properties of the soil grains (e.g., grain size distribution, Atterberg limits, compaction characteristic of soil, to determine the general lithology of soil deposits and possibly the water content) can be accurately determined. An undisturbed sample is one where the condition of the soil in the sample is close enough to the conditions of the soil in-situ to allow tests of structural properties of the soil to be used to approximate the properties of the soil in-situ. Specimens obtained by undisturbed method are used to determine the soil stratification, permeability, density, consolidation and other engineering characteristics.

Offshore soil collection introduces many difficult variables. In shallow water, work can be done off a barge. In deeper water a ship will be required. Deepwater soil samplers are normally variants of Kullenberg-type samplers, a modification on a basic gravity corer using a piston. Seabed samplers are also available, which push the collection tube slowly into the soil.

=== Soil samplers ===
Soil samples are taken using a variety of samplers; some provide only disturbed samples, while others can provide relatively undisturbed samples.

- Shovel. Samples can be obtained by digging out soil from the site. Samples taken this way are disturbed samples.
- Trial pits are relatively small hand or machine excavated tranches used to determine groundwater levels and take disturbed samples from.
- Hand/Machine Driven Auger. This sampler typically consists of a short cylinder with a cutting edge attached to a rod and handle. The sampler is advanced by a combination of rotation and downward force. Samples taken this way are disturbed samples.
- Continuous Flight Auger. A method of sampling using an auger as a corkscrew. The auger is screwed into the ground then lifted out. Soil is retained on the blades of the auger and kept for testing. The soil sampled this way is considered disturbed.
- Split-spoon / SPT Sampler. Utilized in the 'Standard Test Method for Standard Penetration Test (SPT) and Split-Barrel Sampling of Soils' (ASTM D 1586). This sampler is typically an 18"-30" long, 2.0" outside diameter (OD) hollow tube split in half lengthwise. A hardened metal drive shoe with a 1.375" opening is attached to the bottom end, and a one-way valve and drill rod adapter at the sampler head. It is driven into the ground with a 140-pound (64 kg) hammer falling 30". The blow counts (hammer strikes) required to advance the sampler a total of 18" are counted and reported. Generally used for non-cohesive soils, samples taken this way are considered disturbed.
- Modified California Sampler. in the 'Standard Practice for Thick Wall, Ring-Lined, Split Barrel, Drive Sampling ofSoils1' (ASTM D 3550). Similar in concept to the SPT sampler, the sampler barrel has a larger diameter and is usually lined with metal tubes to contain samples. Samples from the Modified California Sampler are considered disturbed due to the large area ratio of the sampler (sampler wall area/sample cross sectional area).
- Shelby Tube Sampler. Utilized in the 'Standard Practice for Thin-Walled Tube Sampling of Soils for Geotechnical Purposes' (ASTM D 1587). This sampler consists of a thin-walled tube with a cutting edge at the toe. A sampler head attaches the tube to the drill rod, and contains a check valve and pressure vents. Generally used in cohesive soils, this sampler is advanced into the soil layer, generally 6" less than the length of the tube. The vacuum created by the check valve and cohesion of the sample in the tube cause the sample to be retained when the tube is withdrawn. Standard ASTM dimensions are; 2" OD, 36" long, 18 gauge thickness; 3" OD, 36" long, 16 gauge thickness; and 5" OD, 54" long, 11 gauge thickness. ASTM allows other diameters as long as they are proportional to the standardized tube designs, and tube length is to be suited for field conditions. Soil sampled in this manner is considered undisturbed.
- Piston samplers. These samplers are thin-walled metal tubes which contain a piston at the tip. The samplers are pushed into the bottom of a borehole, with the piston remaining at the surface of the soil while the tube slides past it. These samplers will return undisturbed samples in soft soils, but are difficult to advance in sands and stiff clays, and can be damaged (compromising the sample) if gravel is encountered. The Livingstone corer, developed by D. A. Livingstone, is a commonly used piston sampler. A modification of the Livingstone corer with a serrated coring head allows it to be rotated to cut through subsurface vegetable matter such as small roots or buried twigs.
- Pitcher Barrel sampler. This sampler is similar to piston samplers, except that there is no piston. There are pressure-relief holes near the top of the sampler to prevent pressure buildup of water or air above the soil sample. Appropriate soil sample for this sampler are clay, silt, sand, partially weathered rocks.

== In situ tests ==
- A standard penetration test is an in-situ dynamic penetration test designed to provide information on the properties of soil, while also collecting a disturbed soil sample for grain-size analysis and soil classification.
- A dynamic cone penetrometer test is an in situ test in which a weight is manually lifted and dropped on a cone which penetrates the ground. the number of mm per hit are recorded and this is used to estimate certain soil properties. This is a simple test method and usually needs backing up with lab data to get a good correlation.
- A cone penetration test (CPT) is performed using an instrumented probe with a conical tip, pushed into the soil hydraulically at a constant rate. A basic CPT instrument reports tip resistance and shear resistance along the cylindrical barrel. CPT data has been correlated to soil properties. Sometimes instruments other than the basic CPT probe are used, including:
- A piezocone penetrometer probe is advanced using the same equipment as a regular CPT probe, but the probe has an additional instrument which measures the groundwater pressure as the probe is advanced.
- A seismic piezocone penetrometer probe is advanced using the same equipment as a CPT or CPTu probe, but the probe is also equipped with either geophones or accelerometers to detect shear waves and/or pressure waves produced by a source at the surface.
- Full flow penetrometers (T-bar, ball, and plate) probes are used in extremely soft clay soils (such as sea-floor deposits) and are advanced in the same manner as the CPT. As their names imply, the T-bar is a cylindrical bar attached at right angles to the drill string forming what look likes a T, the ball is a large sphere, and the plate is flat circular plate. In soft clays, soil flows around the probe similar to a viscous fluid. The pressure due to overburden stress and pore water pressure is equal on all sides of the probes (unlike with CPT's), so no correction is necessary, reducing a source of error and increasing accuracy. Especially desired in soft soils due to the very low loads on the measuring sensors. Full flow probes can also be cycled up and down to measure remolded soil resistance. Ultimately the geotechnical professional can use the measured penetration resistance to estimate undrained and remolded shear strengths.
- Helical probe test soil exploration and compaction testing by the helical probe test (HPT) has become popular for providing a quick and accurate method of determining soil properties at relatively shallow depths. The HPT test is attractive for in-situ footing inspections because it is lightweight and can be conducted quickly by one person. During testing, the probe is driven to the desired depth and the torque required to turn the probe is used as a measure to determine the soil's characteristics. Preliminary ASTM testing has determined that the HPT method correlates well to standard penetration testing (SPT) and cone penetration testing (CPT) with empirical calibration.
- Electrical tomography can be used to survey soil and rock properties and existing underground infrastructure in construction projects.

In addition to the traditional in‑situ tests such as the standard penetration test and cone penetration test, non‑destructive field evaluation methods have been developed to assess dynamic soil behavior under loading conditions relevant to infrastructure performance. Lightweight deflectometer (LWD) testing, for example, enables rapid stiffness and deformation assessment of near‑surface materials without disturbing the soil structure. Studies have shown that LWD measurements can correlate with resilient modulus values obtained from cyclic testing, providing useful in situ estimates of soil stiffness for design and evaluation purposes. Repeated LWD measurements have further been used to model permanent deformation behavior of geomaterials under cyclic loads, improving the prediction of soil responses under repeated traffic or load applications and linking field test data with mechanistic design parameters.

A flat plate dilatometer test (DMT) is a flat plate probe often advanced using CPT rigs, but can also be advanced from conventional drill rigs. A diaphragm on the plate applies a lateral force to the soil materials and measures the strain induced for various levels of applied stress at the desired depth interval.

In-situ gas tests can be carried out in the boreholes on completion and in probe holes made in the sides of the trial pits as part of the site investigation. Testing is normally with a portable meter, which measures the methane content as its percentage volume in air. The corresponding oxygen and carbon dioxide concentrations are also measured. A more accurate method used to monitor over the longer term, consists of gas monitoring standpipes should be installed in boreholes. These typically comprise slotted uPVC pipework surrounded by single sized gravel. The top 0.5 m to 1.0 m of pipework is usually not slotted and is surrounded by bentonite pellets to seal the borehole. Valves are fitted and the installations protected by lockable stopcock covers normally fitted flush with the ground. Monitoring is again with a portable meter and is usually done on a fortnightly or monthly basis.

== Laboratory tests ==
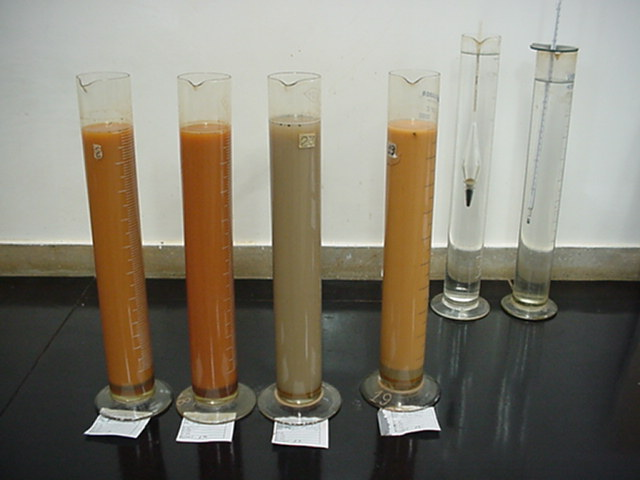
Several hydrometers in use to record the distribution of fine particles in soil samples

A wide variety of laboratory tests can be performed on soils to measure a wide variety of soil properties. Some soil properties are intrinsic to the composition of the soil matrix and are not affected by sample disturbance, while other properties depend on the structure of the soil as well as its composition, and can only be effectively tested on relatively undisturbed samples. Some soil tests measure direct properties of the soil, while others measure "index properties" which provide useful information about the soil without directly measuring the property desired.

Atterberg limits
The Atterberg limits define the boundaries of several states of consistency for plastic soils. The boundaries are defined by the amount of water a soil needs to be at one of those boundaries. The boundaries are called the plastic limit and the liquid limit, and the difference between them is called the plasticity index. The shrinkage limit is also a part of the Atterberg limits. The results of this test can be used to help predict other engineering properties.
California bearing ratio
ASTM D 1883. A test to determine the aptitude of a soil or aggregate sample as a road subgrade. A plunger is pushed into a compacted sample, and its resistance is measured. This test was developed by Caltrans, but it is no longer used in the Caltrans pavement design method. It is still used as a cheap method to estimate the resilient modulus.
Dynamic California Bearing Ratio
In addition to the standardized California bearing ratio (CBR) test procedures used in laboratory compaction testing, research has explored the relationships between measured CBR values and basic compaction parameters of granular and subgrade soils. Laboratory dynamic CBR testing has been correlated with compaction characteristics such as dry density and molding water content, showing strong statistical relationships in sandy and coarse aggregate materials when analyzed across a wide range of moisture and density conditions. These correlations support the use of dynamic CBR measurements and regression models to estimate CBR values from routine compaction results, potentially improving the mechanistic link between laboratory compaction data and soil bearing capacity assessments in road and foundation engineering contexts.
Direct shear test
ASTM D3080. The direct shear test determines the consolidated, drained strength properties of a sample. A constant strain rate is applied to a single shear plane under a normal load, and the load response is measured. If this test is performed with different normal loads, the common shear strength parameters can be determined.
Expansion Index test
This test uses a remolded soil sample to determine the Expansion Index (EI), an empirical value required by building design codes, at a water content of 50% for expansive soils, like expansive clays.
Hydraulic conductivity tests
There are several tests available to determine a soil's hydraulic conductivity. They include the constant head, falling head, and constant flow methods. The soil samples tested can be any type include remolded, undisturbed, and compacted samples.
Oedometer test
This can be used to determine consolidation (ASTM D2435) and swelling (ASTM D4546) parameters.
Particle-size analysis
This is done to determine the soil gradation. Coarser particles are separated in the sieve analysis portion, and the finer particles are analyzed with a hydrometer. The distinction between coarse and fine particles is usually made at 75 μm. The sieve analysis shakes the sample through progressively smaller meshes to determine its gradation. The hydrometer analysis uses the rate of sedimentation to determine particle gradation.
R-Value test
California Test 301 This test measures the lateral response of a compacted sample of soil or aggregate to a vertically applied pressure under specific conditions. This test is used by Caltrans for pavement design, replacing the California bearing ratio test.
Soil compaction tests
Standard Proctor (ASTM D698), Modified Proctor (ASTM D1557), and California Test 216. These tests are used to determine the maximum unit weight and optimal water content a soil can achieve for a given compaction effort.
Soil suction tests
ASTM D5298.
Triaxial shear tests
This is a type of test that is used to determine the shear strength properties of a soil. It can simulate the confining pressure a soil would see deep into the ground. It can also simulate drained and undrained conditions.
Unconfined compression test
ASTM D2166. This test compresses a soil sample to measure its strength. The modifier "unconfined" contrasts this test to the triaxial shear test.
Water content
This test provides the water content of the soil, normally expressed as a percentage of the weight of water to the dry weight of the soil.

== Geophysical exploration ==
Geophysical methods are used in geotechnical investigations to evaluate a site's behavior in a seismic event. By measuring a soil's shear wave velocity, the dynamic response of that soil can be estimated. There are a number of methods used to determine a site's shear wave velocity:

- Crosshole method
- Downhole method (with a seismic CPT or a substitute device)
- Surface wave reflection or refraction
- Suspension logging (also known as P-S logging or Oyo logging)
- Spectral analysis of surface waves (SASW)
- Multichannel analysis of surface waves (MASW)
- Refraction microtremor (ReMi)

Other methods:

- Electromagnetic (radar, resistivity)
- Optical/acoustic tele viewer survey
- Surface wave analysis
- Seismic processing and modelling
- Innovative Solutions for Pavement, Bridge & Concrete Inspection Challenges.
- Locate conduits, post-tension cables, and rebar/reinforcing wire mesh, detect current carrying cables
- Detect and Map of Metallic or Plastic Utilities, Conduits & Voids, Gas Lines and Power Cables
- Groundwater table investigation

== See also ==
- Geotechnical engineering
- Engineering geology
- Geotechnics
- Nippon Screw Weight System
- Soil mechanics
- Soil test
