= Overburden pressure =

Stress imposed on soil or rock by overlying material

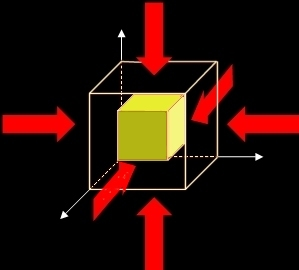
Behavior of lithostatic pressure according to Heim's theory: it acts in all directions and causes a reduction in volume without deformation of the rocks

Pressure is force magnitude applied over an area. Overburden pressure is a geology term that denotes the pressure caused by the weight of the overlying layers of material at a specific depth under the earth's surface. Overburden pressure is also called lithostatic pressure, or vertical stress.

This pressure is usually indicated as $\sigma_v$, or alternatively $\sigma_z$, in the coordinate system of the stress ellipsoid.

At any depth in the subsurface, a point subjected to stresses can be analysed by resolving these stresses along three mutually perpendicular axes, constructing the stress ellipsoid whose axes correspond respectively to the directions of maximum, minimum and intermediate stress. In tectonically stable regions, or under an extensional tectonic regime, the major axis of this ellipsoid is oriented vertically and corresponds in direction and magnitude to lithostatic pressure.

== Definition and quantitative determination ==
Lithostatic pressure increases with depth. In a stratigraphic layer that is in hydrostatic equilibrium; the overburden pressure at a depth z, assuming the magnitude of the gravity acceleration is approximately constant, is given by Stevin's Law, following the function:

$P(z) = P_0 + g \int_{0}^{z} \rho(z) \, dz$

where:

- $z$ is the depth in meters.
- $P(z)$ is the overburden pressure at depth $z$.
- $P_0$ is the pressure at the surface.
- $\rho(z)$ is the density of the material above the depth $z$.
- $g$ is the gravity acceleration in $m/s^2$.

In deep-earth geophysics/geodynamics, gravitational acceleration varies significantly over depth and $g$ should not be assumed to be constant, and should be inside the integral.

The unit of measurement commonly used in geology is the bar or kilobar.

One bar equals 10^5 Pa ≈ 0.9869 atmospheres.

For quick calculations, the lithostatic pressure (P_l) at a given depth can be estimated using the simplified equation:

P_l = ρgZ

where ρ = average density of the rocks forming the overlying rock column; g = acceleration due to gravity; Z = height of the column.

Some sections of stratigraphic layers can be sealed or isolated. These changes create areas where there is not static equilibrium. A location in the layer is said to be in under pressure when the local pressure is less than the hydrostatic pressure, and in overpressure when the local pressure is greater than the hydrostatic pressure.

Numerous measurements of vertical stresses carried out in mines, tunnels and other conditions related to geomining activities, subsurface engineering or underground scientific research have confirmed the general validity of the above equation regarding the variation of pressure along the vertical, with some exceptions mainly in surveys conducted at shallow depths.

By contrast, it is not easy to experimentally determine and estimate the value of horizontal stresses at a depth z. For convenience and simplicity of analysis this problem is addressed by considering the ratio $k$ between the average of the horizontal stresses and the vertical stress, using the following equation:

$$\frac{(\sigma_H + \sigma_h)}{2} = \bar{\sigma}_H = K\sigma_v = Kp(z)$$

and therefore

$$K = \frac{\bar{\sigma}_H}{\sigma_v}$$

where $\sigma_H$ and $\sigma_h$ are respectively the maximum and minimum horizontal stresses, $\bar{\sigma}_H$ is the average horizontal stress, and $K$ is called the lateral stress coefficient.

In 1952 Terzaghi, evaluating the conditions of the rock mass as a load-bearing body whose lateral expansion (deformation) is prevented during vertical loading, suggested that the value of the parameter $k$ was independent of depth but a function of the Poisson's ratio, specific to the rock present at depth z, according to the equation:

$$k = \frac{\nu}{1-\nu}$$

In consolidated rocks the values of Poisson's ratio generally vary between 0.2 and 0.3, consequently $k$ would vary between 0.25 and 0.43.

This equation treats the behaviour of the rock mass as comparable to that of an elastic material and does not consider the contribution of tectonic stresses to horizontal pressure values. Although it is widely used for a first rough estimate of the stress ellipsoid (assuming equality of stresses along the x and y axes), decades of measurements indicate that it is not always accurate. Measured values of $k$ are often higher than theoretical values at shallow depths and decrease with increasing depth, within the following range:

100/z + 0.3 < $k$ < 1500/z + 0.5

=== Heim theory ===
In 1878 the geologist Albert Heim in his work Untersuchungen über den Mechanismus der Gebirgsbildung im Anschluss an die Geologische Monographie der Tödi-Windgällen-Gruppe, Basel (1878), cited by later scholars as a foundational text for the study of subsurface pressure trends, expressed his theory or hypothesis regarding rock deformation, suggesting that lithostatic stresses over time behave in a viscoelastic manner due to the viscous flow of rocks, thus giving lithostatic pressure a hydrostatic character.

Heim based his reasoning on a hypothetical column of rock. For such a column there exists a theoretical maximum height h, above which its base would fracture and collapse because the weight of the column would exceed the rock’s strength. This height h, which varies depending on rock type, would not reach 10,000 metres. The rock mass forming the Earth can be considered as composed of many adjacent rock columns extending toward the Earth's centre, each evidently taller than h. Nevertheless, each column does not collapse under its own weight because it is laterally confined by surrounding columns in a system of mutual support. This represents a condition of static equilibrium with the rock mass at rest.

If this condition were disturbed—for instance by theoretically removing a column or part of it—a void would be created which would be filled by rock flowing from the surrounding columns, collapsing just enough to restore equilibrium. In this sense lithostatic pressure in the subsurface, acting in all directions, behaves like hydrostatic pressure. The difference from liquids lies in the different viscosity and resistance to shear stress between liquids and rocks, meaning that rock movements occur on geological timescales and are imperceptible to human senses.

Today this theory provides a good approximation in mining contexts for the behaviour of ductile rocks such as evaporites and coal, and it is partially consistent with the observation that the previously discussed lateral stress coefficient often tends toward unity for depths greater than one kilometre. This approximation of $k = 1$ is still commonly accepted and used in some branches of the Earth sciences that do not require the use of the stress ellipsoid, such as petrology. By contrast, in disciplines requiring quantitative and directional evaluation of stresses within the Earth—such as civil engineering, mining engineering, structural geology analysis and geomechanics—it is no longer considered adequate except as a simple reference model. Geomechanics researchers have suggested that such anisotropies may exist for at least 50 km within the Earth's crust, with values of around 20,000 psi.

== Geobaric gradient ==
The average geobaric gradient corresponds to about 270 bar/km in the crust and 330 bar/km in the mantle.

Lithostatic pressure acts equally in all directions, like hydrostatic pressure.

Lithostatic pressure increases with depth and produces reduction of rock porosity.

It causes a reduction in volume without differential deformation, whereas directional pressures favour deformation of materials.

Lithostatic pressure is important in metamorphic and diagenetic processes.

The lithostatic pressure present at depths of tens of kilometres is on the order of 1,000–2,000 bar.

== See also ==
- Effective stress
- Geothermobarometry
- Lateral earth pressure
- Pore water pressure
- Sedimentary rock

== Bibliography ==
- Negretti, Giancarlo. Fondamenti di petrografia. McGraw-Hill, 2003.
- Lupia Palmieri, Elvidio; Parotto, Maurizio. Il globo terrestre e la sua evoluzione. Zanichelli.
- Bosellini, Alfonso. Le scienze della Terra. Bovolenta.
- Fowler, C. M. R. The Solid Earth: An Introduction to Global Geophysics. Cambridge University Press.
- Winter, John D. An Introduction to Igneous and Metamorphic Petrology. Prentice Hall.
- Brudy, M.; Zoback, M. D.; Fuchs, K.; Rummel, F.; Baumgärtner, J. "Estimation of the complete stress tensor to 8 km depth in the KTB scientific drill holes: Implications for crustal strength." Journal of Geophysical Research 102 (1997): 18,453–18,475.
- Hoek, E.; Brown, E. T. Underground Excavations in Rock. Spon Press, 1980. ISBN 0900488549.
- Ghosh, A. K. "Rock Stress Measurements for Underground Excavations." In: Proceedings of the 12th International Conference of the International Association for Computer Methods and Advances in Geomechanics (IACMAG), 2008.
- Jaeger, John Conrad; Cook, Neville G. W.; Zimmerman, Robert W. Fundamentals of Rock Mechanics. 4th ed. Wiley-Blackwell, 2007. ISBN 0632057599.
- Milnes, A. G. "Albert Heim's General Theory of Natural Rock Deformation (1878)." Geology 7, no. 2 (1979): 99–103.
- Fairhurst, C. "On the Determination of the State of Stress in Rock Masses." Conference on Drilling and Rock Mechanics, Austin, Texas, 18–19 January 1965.
- Desio, Ardito. Geologia applicata all'ingegneria. Hoepli, 1973. ISBN 8820303337.
