= Fillunger =

Fillunger is a surname. Notable people with the surname include:

- Marie Fillunger (1850–1930), Austrian singer
- Paul Fillunger (1883–1937), Austrian geotechnical engineer
