= Loeng Nok Tha Airport =

Loeng Nok Tha Airport สนามบินเลิงนกทา
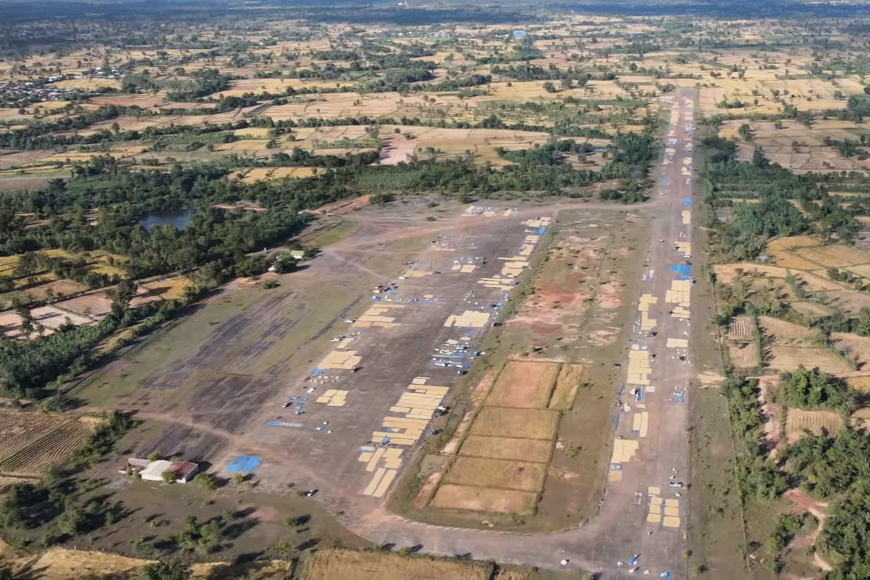
- Aerial view shows farmers in Yasothon Province using the runway of Loeng Nok Tha Airport to dry their rice.
- IATA: none; ICAO: VTUT

Summary
- Airport type: Defunct
- Location: Khok Samran, Yasothon province, Thailand
- Opened: 1967
- Closed: 1990s
- Elevation AMSL: 461 ft (141 m)
- Coordinates: 16°09′32″N 104°35′34″E
- Interactive map of Loeng Nok Tha Airport

Runways
Direction	Length		Surface
Direction	ft	m	Surface
03/21	6,020	1,835	tarmac

Loeng Nok Tha Airport, also known as Crown Field (ICAO: VTUT) was a Royal Thai Air Force airbase constructed by the British as part of the Special Logistics Action, Thailand (SLAT) agreement. The airfield is located in Khok Samran, Yasothon province, Thailand.

== Operation Crown ==
On 19 March 1963, the United States and Thailand signed the Special Logistics Action, Thailand (SLAT) agreement to fund and complete a number of projects under the Military Assistance Program.

In February 1963 as part of the SLAT, a proposal was made for Britain to construct an airfield at Loeng Nok Tha near Mukhadan. This project later earned the nickname ‘Operation Crown’. Loeng Nok Tha Airport begun its construction in late 1963 with the 59th Field Squadron assigned in the laying of tarmac.

=== Construction efforts ===
The airfield was opened in June 1965 by Prime Minister of Thailand Thanom Kittakachorn for light aircraft traffic. However shortly after the construction, the wet season rainfall penetrated through the macadam (tarmac) and brought the CBR level to 0% in many areas. In October 1965, the 59th Field Squadron returned from Singapore to strip the tarmac from the airfield for reconstruction efforts.

In December 1965, the 11th Independent Field Squadron was deployed in order to support 59th Field Squadron in concreting the runway with pavement quality concrete (PQC). Finally, in December 1966, the 34th Field Squadron took over Squadron 59th’s operations and was tasked with replacing poor stabilizations with new lean mixed concrete.

In a debate on 7 July 1966, Mr. Eldon Griffiths asked the Prime Minister about the progress made in the airfield, he replied that the airfield had good construction progress as it was a gift to Thailand.

=== Opening ===
Shortly after the debate, the airfield was fully completed in 1967, opening up to transportation aircraft operated by the Royal Thai Air Force (RTAF). The construction of the runway took nearly 7 months in order to be operated by standard jet aircraft. It was reported that the RTAF only used the airfield for about 3 years.

== Modern day usage ==
In 2014, the Civil Aviation opened the airfield to tourism, and planned the runway to be expanded at 3,000 metres for larger aircraft.

In 2016, the Friends Flying Club & Training was based in the airfield, and held ultralight pilot license (UPL) courses and private pilot license (PPL) courses. Light aircraft such as the Cessna 172, Jabiru Aircraft, Sonex Aircraft Sonex, Quicksilver, Piper PA-44 Seminole and Piper PA-28 Cherokee Warrior III were used by the flying club. The flying club moved to Best Ocean Airpark, leaving the airfield fully disused.

In 2018, the Thai Cabinet approved plans to develop airports in the lower northeast region to improved social and economic development. One of these were Leong Nok Tha Airport, which was endorsed by the cabinet.

Despite all development plans, no recent progress has been made. Currently, the former airfield is being used by local farmers to dry rice crop. Soldiers at the airport give the farmers permission, and reportedly 100 farmers show up each day and night to guard the rice crops.
