= Epoxy moisture control system =

Epoxy moisture control systems are chemical barriers that are used to prevent moisture damage to flooring. Excessive moisture vapor emissions in concrete slabs can mean significant, expensive damage to a flooring installation. Hundreds of millions of dollars are spent annually just in the United States to correct moisture-related problems in flooring. These problems include failure of the flooring adhesive; damage to the floor covering itself, such as blistering; the formation of efflorescence salts; and the growth of mold and mildew.

In 2013, the ASTM F3010-13 "Standard Practice for Two-Component Resin Based Membrane-Forming Moisture Mitigation Systems for Use Under Resilient Floor Coverings" was adopted to establish performance criteria required for two component membranes employed as concrete moisture control systems.

Excess moisture in concrete is defined by the amount of moisture emitting from the concrete subfloor that exceeds the amount allowed by the flooring manufacturer. This condition occurs when the flooring is installed before the water in the concrete mix that is not needed for hydration (strengthening) has had adequate time to evaporate. Causes of this condition include a construction schedule that does not allow at least 28 days for the slab to dry; using too much water in the concrete mix; installing the slab without a puncture- and tear-resistant, low-permeability vapor barrier beneath it; rewetting of the slab due to precipitation; inadequate drying conditions, which can include air temperatures that are lower than 50 °F, high humidity in the surrounding air and poor airflow; and liquid water infiltration due to external sources, such as broken pipes, irrigation, improper sloping of the landscape, condensation, cleaning and maintenance, and moisture from flooring adhesives.

Epoxy flooring is a durable, attractive, and resistant solution for residential, commercial, and industrial spaces, offering a wide range of colors and finishes to enhance aesthetic appeal and functionality.

There are two industry standards for measuring moisture vapor emissions in concrete: calcium chloride testing (ASTM F1869) and relative humidity testing (ASTM F2170). Epoxy moisture control systems can be used when these tests determine that the moisture vapor emissions need to be remediated in order to install the selected floor covering within the timeframe allotted by the construction schedule.

Epoxy moisture control systems are roller-applied and are available in one-coat and two-coat varieties. One-coat systems allow for a faster installation time, while two-coat systems address the potential for pinholes or voids in the system, which can cause future failures. Epoxy moisture control systems can be applied over concrete with relative humidity levels up to 100%, and there are systems available on the market today that can be applied over concrete that is physically damp. In some cases, with the use of an epoxy moisture control system, floor coverings can be installed just 7 days after the slab is poured.

When applied correctly, epoxy moisture control systems are designed to bring moisture emission rates to acceptable levels for the flooring being installed, which combats flooring failures, microbiological activity (mold and mildew) and other problems associated with excess moisture in the slab.
