= Vacuum consolidation =

Vacuum consolidation (or vacuum preloading) is a soft soil improvement method that has been successfully used by geotechnical engineers and specialists of ground improvement companies in countries such as Australia, China, Korea, Thailand and France for soil improvement or land reclamation. It does not necessarily require surcharge fill and vacuum loads of 80kPa or greater can, typically, be maintained for as long as required.

However, if loads of 80kPa or greater are needed in order to achieve the target soil improvement, additional surcharge may be placed on top of the vacuum system. The vacuum preloading method is cheaper and faster than the fill surcharge method for an equivalent load in suitable areas. Where the underlying ground consists of permeable materials, such as sand or sandy clay, the cost of the technique will be significantly increased due to the requirement of cut-off walls into non-permeable layers to seal off the vacuum. It has been suggested by Carter et al. (2005) that the settlement resulting from vacuum preloading is less than that from a surcharge load of the same magnitude as vacuum consolidation is influenced by drainage boundary conditions.
