= R-value (soils) =

Measure of compacted soils or aggregrate

The R-Value test measures the response of a compacted sample of soil or aggregate to a vertically applied pressure under specific conditions. This test is used by Caltrans for pavement design, replacing the California bearing ratio test. Many other agencies have adopted the California pavement design method, and specify R-Value testing for subgrade soils and road aggregates.

The test method states:

The R-value of a material is determined when the material is in a state of saturation such that water will be exuded from the compacted test specimen when a 16.8 kN load (2.07 MPa) is applied. Since it is not always possible to prepare a test specimen that will exude water at the specified load, it is necessary to test a series of specimens prepared at different moisture contents.

R-Value is used in pavement design, with the thickness of each layer dependent on the R-value of the layer below and the expected level of traffic loading, expressed as a Traffic Index. Details of the pavement design procedure are given in Chapter 600 of the California Highway Design Manual.
