= Well engineering =

Well engineering consists of engineering facilitating the design and construction of a well. It is based on pore pressure, kick tolerance, casing functions, casing design and cementing. It is sometimes related to drilling and petroleum engineering.

== Overview ==
Study of formation pressures is important for the safe planning of a well. Values of formation pressures are used to design safe mud weights to overcome fracturing the formation and prevent well kicks.

== See also ==
- Petroleum engineering
- Drilling
- Oil well
- Well logging
