= Nippon Screw Weight System =

On-site ground survey machine

Diagonal penetration and self-scuttling at crop field by NSWS

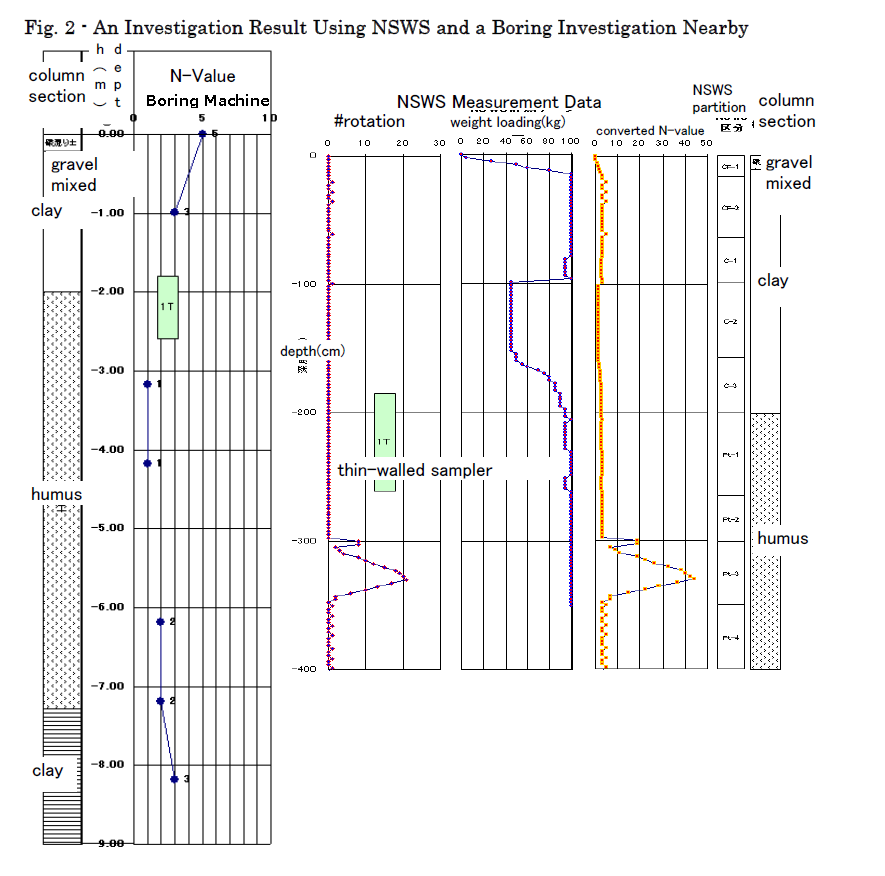
A comparison of boring log to NSWS log

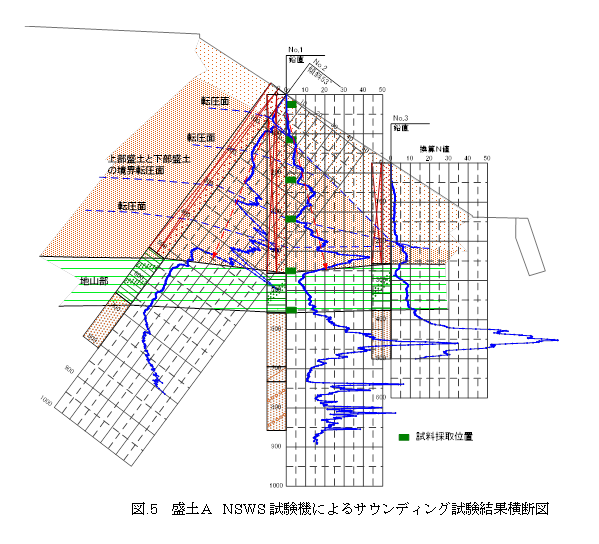
Cross sectional area of railway embankment with NSWS data

The Nippon Screw Weight System (NSWS) is an on-site ground survey machine that examines the geotechnical engineering properties of soil. The NSWS was developed to encounter weather abnormalities and natural hazards, saving human lives.

Introduced in 2012 by the National Agriculture and Food Research Organization (NARO), the NSWS was designed to overcome problems with the Method for standard penetration test (SPT).

NSWS was created by 耕三 大北, was the member of 311 earthquake disaster committee of the Japanese Geotechnical Society. The society released a report in June, 2012 proposing to the Japanese government a use of NSWS to investigate the aftermath of the 2011 Tōhoku earthquake and tsunami.

== Features ==
The NSWS is compact, weighs 120 kg, and has wheels, making it suitable for ground measurement in crowded residential areas. It costs much less than the conventional SPT test and triaxial compression test.

NSWS can measure very soft zones, converted N-value of zero in the ground that had been considered difficult. It has 1.08 cm interval.SPT conducts the test every 50 cm, and 30 cm interval out of 50 cm is tested so the rest, 20 cm, is not measured; that means 40% of an entire hole is unknown. NSWS does not suffer from such a limitation.

NSWS can penetrate the ground diagonally and can cut through soft gravels. NSWS has in-situ shear test capability, the result of the joint research with NARO and Okita-Ko Co., Ltd

NSWS can prepare converted N-value, density, in-situ shear data for Stability Analysis. NSWS enables multi-point surveying due to its diagonal penetration capability and high-mobility. The multiple spots on the weak layers can be analyzed.

== See also ==
- Boring (earth)
- Cone penetration test
- Geotechnical investigation
- Soil mechanics
