= Void (composites) =

Empty space in mixed materials

A void or a pore is three-dimensional region that remains unfilled with polymer and fibers in a composite material. Voids are typically the result of poor manufacturing of the material and are generally deemed undesirable. Voids can affect the mechanical properties and lifespan of the composite. They degrade mainly the matrix-dominated properties such as interlaminar shear strength, longitudinal compressive strength, and transverse tensile strength. Voids can act as crack initiation sites as well as allow moisture to penetrate the composite and contribute to the anisotropy of the composite. For aerospace applications, a void content of approximately 1% is still acceptable, while for less sensitive applications, the allowance limit is 3-5%. Although a small increase in void content may not seem to cause significant issues, a 1-3% increase in void content of carbon fiber reinforced composite can reduce the mechanical properties by up to 20%

== Quantification ==
Void content in composites is represented as a ratio, also called void ratio, where the volume of voids, solid material, and bulk volume are taken into account. Void ratio can be calculated by the formula below where e is the void ratio of the composite, V_{v} is the volume of the voids, and V_{t} is the volume of the bulk material.

$$\text{Void Ratio}(e)=\frac{V_v}{V_t-V_v}$$

== Formation ==
Voids are considered defects in composite structures and there are several types of voids that can form in composites depending on the fabrication route and matrix type. Among other factors that can influence the quantity and location of voids are pre-preg impregnation, surface morphology, curing parameters, compaction pressure, fiber bridging, excessive resin bleed, and the thickness of layup .

A resin with a high viscosity will likely produce voids in a composite. It is difficult for a resin or matrix with a high viscosity to penetrate the original void spaces between adjacent fibers. This will cause voids to form close the fiber surface. Preventing these voids becomes a more daunting task when the fibers are packed tightly together in a composite

A high void proportion can be obtained in a composite due to errors in processing as well. If the temperature used for curing is too low for the particular matrix used, complete degassing might not occur. However, if the temperature used for curing is too high for a particular matrix, gelation might occur too rapidly and voids may still be present . For example, if a laminate composite is cured at a temperature that is too low for the particular matrix used, the resin viscosity could remain high and hinder removing the void spaces between individual plies Some resins can cure at room temperature while other resins require temperatures up to 200 °C, but curing above or below the required temperature for a particular matrix can increase the amount of voids present in a composite. If the injection pressure in a resin injection pultrusion process is not high enough, the resin or matrix might not be able to penetrate the fiber bed to completely wet out the fibers without voids. Entrapped air or bubbles can be formed in the resin during resin mixing or as a result of mechanical gas entrapment by dual scale fingering in fibrous reinforcements. If these bubbles are not removed before the wetting of the fibers or curing of the composite, the bubbles could become voids that can be found throughout the final composite structure.

== Reduction ==
Because voids are viewed as defects in composite materials, many methods are applied for reducing voids in composites. Traditionally, using vacuum bagging system and autoclave under pressure and heat will minimize or prevent voids from forming.

The vacuum bagging system combined with autoclave is a common method used in industrial processes to achieve a low void content for thermoset composites. Vacuum evacuation is the way reducing exciting amount of voids by physically transporting the voids out of the resin and fiber network through vacuum lines, and it is influenced by the viscosity of resin. Autoclave pressure is used to assist vacuum in removing trapped air and excess resin while at the same time preventing volatiles from coming out of the resin at high temperatures.

Optimization of injection flow rate is often calculated to minimize voids in Resin Transfer Molded (RTM) or Vacuum Assisted Resin Infusion (VARI) composites. During the injection phase, a liquid resin impregnates the fibers before curing and solidification, often creating voids in the part during the injection. Through an algorithm between fluid flow velocity (v) and the percentages of macro-voids (V_{1}) and micro-voids (V_{2})

$$V_1= -32.28-11.8\cdot \log(v)$$

$$V_2= 6.35+2.35 \cdot \log(v)$$

an optimized rate can be obtained and the voids in RTM and VARI composites can be reduced, thus improving properties of the composite.
