= SESL Australia =

- Company type: Private company
- Industry: Soil science (horticulture, agriculture, environment)
- Founded: 1983 (as Sydney Environmental and Soil Laboratory)
- Founder: Simon Leake
- Headquarters: Thornleigh, NSW, Australia; Canberra, ACT; Fortitude Valley, QLD; Flemington, VIC;
- Area served: Australia
- Services: Specialist consultancy laboratory providing fieldwork, monitoring, laboratory analysis, interpretation and recommendations, and training
- Website: SESL Australia website

SESL Australia was established in 1983 as Sydney Environmental & Soil Laboratory by Simon Leake. SESL provides independent laboratory testing and advisory services to landscape, horticulture, sport and leisure turf, civil construction, environment, government, mining and the waste industry. It offers sample collection, monitoring, analysis and interpretation of soil, water, plant tissue and wastes. SESL also offers training courses on a range of earth science topics mainly focused on urban horticulture, sport and leisure turf, and environmental water.

== History ==
SESL was founded in 1983 by Simon Leake, a soil science graduate of the University of Sydney.

== Services ==
NATA-accredited laboratory analyses (soil, water, plant tissue, wastes), site analyses (soil, water), soil specifications, plant pest and disease identification, training.

== Projects ==
SESL has been involved from the planning stage in various major infrastructure projects in NSW, notably the Darling Harbour redevelopment, the Sydney Olympic Park redevelopment at Homebush Bay, Central Park on the site of the old Carlton & United Breweries plant in Chippendale and the Barangaroo redevelopment on Sydney Harbour.

== Philanthropy ==
SESL sponsored a prize in oral presentation and prizes for best fourth year thesis, best laboratory practical and best student at the Faculty of Agriculture, Food and Natural Resources at the University of Sydney from the late 1990s until 2009.

== Advocacy ==
Simon Leake has appeared on ABC's Gardening Australia and Burke's Backyard. SESL Australia contributes to the environmental and soil industries through its monthly Fertile Mind's blog which updates the community on current projects and industry events. In 2014 Simon published Soils for Landscape Development: Selection, Specification and Validation ISBN 9780643109643 under CSIRO publishing, co-authored by landscape architect and consulting arborist Elke Haege.

== Professional memberships ==
From 1997 until 2011, Simon Leake served as a Member of the Standards Australia CS/37 committee, which developed and maintains the Australian standards AS 3743 Potting Mixes, AS 4454 Composts, Soil Conditioners and Mulches, and AS 4419 Soils for Landscaping and Garden Use.

Simon Leake is a member of the Royal Botanic Gardens Trust Gardens Committee, a voluntary expert reference panel assisting the Trust in the design, technical specification and implementation of planning at the Royal Botanic Gardens Sydney, Mount Annan Botanic Garden and Mount Tomah Botanic Garden.
