= Paul Fillunger =

Austrian geotechnical engineer

- Born: June 25, 1883; Vienna, Austria
- Died: March 7, 1937 (aged 53); Vienna, Austria
- Occupation: Geotechnical engineer

Paul Fillunger (June 25, 1883 in Vienna – March 7, 1937 in Vienna) was an Austrian geotechnical engineer.

Raised in a family of engineers, he studied at the Technische Hochschule in Vienna and took a position in the state-owned railway company in 1906. In 1908 he completed a PhD and then went to teach mathematics, machine industry and then mechanics at the University of Vienna.

Fillunger pioneered the study of saturated ground and was made famous by an article published in 1913.

He discovered the difference in behaviors of the effective and general stresses in samples of ground, opening the way for further research. He is considered to be a pioneer of the theory of liquid-saturated porous solids.

Fillunger's theories put him in heated conflict with Karl von Terzaghi, who is often referred to as "father of soil mechanics", whom Fillunger was accused of slandering. The university blamed Fillunger, who then committed suicide by opening the gas jets in the bathroom with his wife.
