= Void ratio =

Dimensionless quantity related to porosity

The void ratio ($e$) of a mixture of solids and fluids (gases and liquids), or of a porous composite material such as concrete, is the ratio of the volume of the voids ($V_V$) filled by the fluids to the volume of all the solids ($V_S$). It is a dimensionless quantity in materials science and in soil science, and is closely related to the porosity (often noted as $\phi$, ${\eta}$ (sometimes simply written as n), or ε, depending on the convention), the ratio of the volume of voids ($V_V$) to the total (or bulk) volume ($V_T$), as follows:

$$e = \frac{V_V}{V_S} = \frac{V_V}{V_T - V_V} = \frac{\phi}{1 - \phi}$$

in which, for idealized porous media with a rigid and undeformable skeleton structure (i.e., without variation of total volume ($V_T$) when the water content of the sample changes (no expansion or swelling with the wetting of the sample); nor contraction or shrinking effect after drying of the sample), the total (or bulk) volume ($V_T$) of an ideal porous material is the sum of the volume of the solids ($V_S$) and the volume of voids ($V_V$):

$$V_T = V_S + V_V$$

(in a rock, or in a soil, this also assumes that the solid grains and the pore fluid are clearly separated, so swelling clay minerals such as smectite, montmorillonite, or bentonite containing bound water in their interlayer space are not considered here.)

and

$$\phi = \frac{V_V}{V_T} = \frac{V_V}{V_S + V_V} = \frac{e}{1 + e}$$

where $e$ is the void ratio, $\phi$ is the porosity, V_{V} is the volume of void-space (gases and liquids), V_{S} is the volume of solids, and V_{T} is the total (or bulk) volume. This figure is relevant in composites, in mining (particular with regard to the properties of tailings), and in soil science. In geotechnical engineering, it is considered one of the state variables of soils and represented by the symbol $e$.

Note that in geotechnical engineering, the symbol $\phi$ usually represents the angle of shearing resistance, a shear strength (soil) parameter. Because of this, in soil science and geotechnics, these two equations are usually presented using ${\eta}$ for porosity:

$$e = \frac{V_V}{V_S} = \frac{V_V}{V_T - V_V} = \frac{\eta}{1 - {\eta}}$$

and

$${\eta} = \frac{V_V}{V_T} = \frac{V_V}{V_S + V_V} = \frac{e}{1 + e}$$

where $e$ is the void ratio, ${\eta}$ is the porosity, V_{V} is the volume of void-space (air and water), V_{S} is the volume of solids, and V_{T} is the total (or bulk) volume.

== Applications in soil sciences and geomechanics ==
- Control of the volume change tendency. Suppose the void ratio is high (loose soils). Under loading, voids in the soil skeleton tend to decrease (shrinkage), increasing the contact between adjacent particles and modifying the soil effective stress. The opposite situation, i. e. when the void ratio is relatively small (dense soils), indicates that the volume of the soil is vulnerable to increase (swelling) under unloading – the smectite (montmorillonite, bentonite) partially dry clay particles present in an unsaturated soil can swell due to their hydration after contact with water (when the saturated/unsaturated conditions fluctuate in a soil).
- Control of the fluid hydraulic conductivity (ability of water movement through the soil). Loose soils show a high hydraulic conductivity, while dense soils are less permeable.
- Particle movement. Small, unbound particles can move relatively quickly through the larger open voids in loose soil. In contrast, in dense soil, finer particles cannot freely pass the smaller pores, which leads to the clogging of the porosity.

== See also ==
- Pore space in soil
- Void (composites)
