= Pore water pressure =

Pressure of groundwater held within a soil or rock, in gaps between particles

Pore water pressure (sometimes abbreviated to pwp) refers to the pressure of groundwater held within a soil or rock, in gaps between particles (pores). Pore water pressures below the phreatic level of the groundwater are measured with piezometers. The vertical pore water pressure distribution in aquifers can generally be assumed to be close to hydrostatic.

In the unsaturated ("vadose") zone, the pore pressure is determined by capillarity and is also referred to as tension, suction, or matric pressure. Pore water pressures under unsaturated conditions are measured with tensiometers, which operate by allowing the pore water to come into equilibrium with a reference pressure indicator through a permeable ceramic cup placed in contact with the soil.

Pore water pressure is vital in calculating the stress state in the ground soil mechanics, from Terzaghi's expression for the effective stress of the soil.

== General principles ==
Pressure develops due to:

- Water elevation difference: water flowing from a higher elevation to a lower elevation and causing a velocity head, or with water flow, as exemplified in Bernoulli's energy equations.
- Hydrostatic water pressure: resulting from the weight of material above the point measured.
- Osmotic pressure: inhomogeneous aggregation of ion concentrations, which causes a force in water particles as they attract by the molecular laws of attraction.
- Absorption pressure: attraction of surrounding soil particles to one another by adsorbed water films.
- Matric suction: the defining trait of unsaturated soil, this term corresponds to the pressure dry soil exerts on the surrounding material to equalise the moisture content in the overall block of soil and is defined as the difference between pore air pressure,$(u_a)$, and pore water pressure, $(u_w)$.

== Below the water table ==
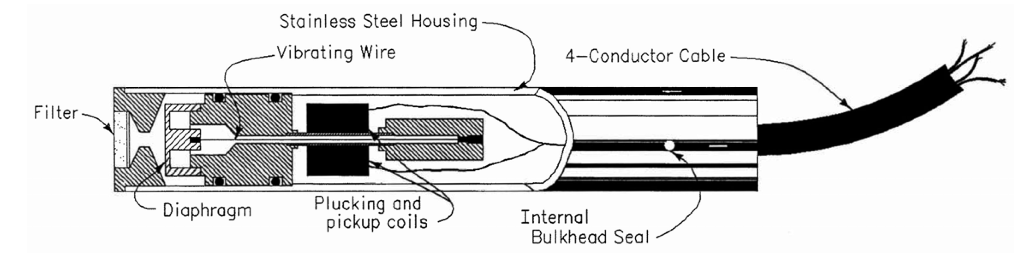
A vibrating wire piezometer. The vibrating wire converts the fluid pressures into equivalent frequency signals that are then recorded.

The buoyancy effects of water have a large impact on certain soil properties, such as the effective stress present at any point in a soil medium. Consider an arbitrary point five meters below the ground surface. In dry soil, particles at this point experience a total overhead stress equal to the depth underground (5 meters), multiplied by the specific weight of the soil. However, when the local water table height is within said five meters, the total stress felt five meters below the surface is decreased by the product of the height of the water table in to the five meter area, and the specific weight of water, 9.81 kN/m^3. This parameter is called the effective stress of the soil, basically equal to the difference in a soil's total stress and pore water pressure. The pore water pressure is essential in differentiating a soil's total stress from its effective stress. A correct representation of stress in the soil is necessary for accurate field calculations in a variety of engineering trades.

=== Equation for calculation ===
When there is no flow, the pore pressure at depth, h_{w}, below the water surface is:

$$p_s=g_w h_w$$,

where:

- p_{s} is the saturated pore water pressure (kPa)
- g_{w} is the unit weight of water (kN/m^{3}),

$g_w=9.81 kN/m^3$

- h_{w} is the depth below the water table (m),

=== Measurement methods and standards ===
The standard method for measuring pore water pressure below the water table employs a piezometer, which measures the height to which a column of the liquid rises against gravity; i.e., the static pressure (or piezometric head) of groundwater at a specific depth. Piezometers often employ electronic pressure transducers to provide data. The United States Bureau of Reclamation has a standard for monitoring water pressure in a rock mass with piezometers. It sites ASTM D4750, "Standard Test Method for Determining Subsurface Liquid Levels in a Borehole or Monitoring Well (Observation Well)".

== Above the water table ==
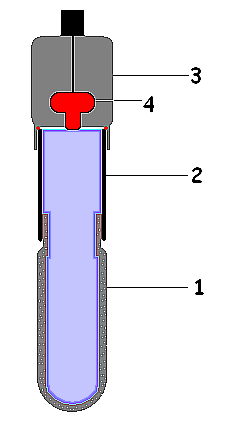
Electronic tensiometer probe: (1) porous cup; (2) water-filled tube; (3) sensor-head; (4) pressure sensor

At any point above the water table, in the vadose zone, the effective stress is approximately equal to the total stress, as proven by Terzaghi's principle. Realistically, the effective stress is greater than the total stress, as the pore water pressure in these partially saturated soils is actually negative. This is primarily due to the surface tension of pore water in voids throughout the vadose zone causing a suction effect on surrounding particles, i.e. matric suction. This capillary action is the "upward movement of water through the vadose zone" (Coduto, 266). Increased water infiltration, such as that caused by heavy rainfall, brings about a reduction in matric suction, following the relationship described by the soil water characteristic curve (SWCC), resulting in a reduction of the soil's shear strength, and reduced slope stability. Capillary effects in soil are more complex than in free water due to the randomly connected void space and particle interference through which to flow; regardless, the height of this zone of capillary rise, where negative pore water pressure is generally peaks, can be closely approximated by a simple equation. The height of capillary rise is inversely proportional to the diameter of void space in contact with water. Therefore, the smaller the void space, the higher water will rise due to tension forces. Sandy soils consist of more coarse material with more room for voids, and therefore tend to have a much shallower capillary zone than do more cohesive soils, such as clays and silts.

=== Equation for calculation ===
If the water table is at depth d_{w} in fine-grained soils, then the pore pressure at the ground surface is:

$$p_g=-g_w d_w$$,

where:

- p_{g} is the unsaturated pore water pressure (Pa) at ground level,
- g_{w} is the unit weight of water (kN/m^{3}),

$$g_w=9.81 kN/m^3$$

- d_{w} is the depth of the water table (m),

and the pore pressure at depth, z, below the surface is:

$$p_u=g_w (z-d_w)$$,

where:

- p_{u} is the unsaturated pore water pressure (Pa) at point, z, below ground level,
- z is depth below ground level.

=== Measurement methods and standards ===
A tensiometer is an instrument used to determine the matric water potential ($\Psi_m$) (soil moisture tension) in the vadose zone. An ISO standard, "Soil quality — Determination of pore water pressure — Tensiometer method", ISO 11276:1995, "describes methods for the determination of pore water pressure (point measurements) in unsaturated and saturated soil using tensiometers. Applicable for in situ measurements in the field and, e. g. soil cores, used in experimental examinations." It defines pore water pressure as "the sum of matric and pneumatic pressures".

==== Matric pressure ====
The amount of work that must be done in order to transport reversibly and isothermally an infinitesimal quantity of water, identical in composition to the soil water, from a pool at the elevation and the external gas pressure of the point under consideration, to the soil water at the point under consideration, divided by the volume of water transported.

==== Pneumatic pressure ====
The amount of work that must be done in order to transport reversibly and isothermally an infinitesimal quantity of water, identical in composition to the soil water, from a pool at atmospheric pressure and at the elevation of the point under consideration, to a similar pool at an external gas pressure of the point under consideration, divided by the volume of water transported.

== See also ==
- Internal erosion
- Frost weathering
- Geotechnical engineering
- Water potential
- Well engineering
