= California bearing ratio =

Measure of the strength of a road subgrade

The California Bearing Ratio (CBR) is a measure of the strength of the subgrade of a road or other paved area, and of the materials used in its construction.

The ratio is measured using a standardized penetration test first developed by the California Division of Highways for highway engineering. Empirical tests measure the strength of the material and are not a true representation of the resilient modulus.

== Definition ==
The CBR is the ratio of the bearing load that penetrates a material to a specific depth compared with the load giving the same penetration into crushed stone. The test measures neither Stiffness Modulus nor Shear Strength directly, but gives a combined measure of both.

Penetration is measured by applying the bearing load on the sample using a standard plunger of diameter 50 mm at the rate of 1.25 mm/min. The CBR is expressed as a percentage of the actual load causing the penetrations of 2.5 mm or 5.0 mm to the standard loads on crushed stone. A load penetration curve is drawn. The load values on standard crushed stones are 1,370 kgf (13.44 kN) and 2,055 kgf (20.15 kN) at 2.5 mm and 5.0 mm penetrations respectively.

The CBR can be mathematically expressed as:

$CBR=\frac {p}{p_s} \cdot 100%$

| $p \quad$ | = measured pressure for site soils [N/mm^{2}] |
| $p_s \quad$ | = pressure to achieve equal penetration on standard crushed stone [N/mm^{2}] |

== Test procedure ==
The CBR test is a penetration test in which a standard piston, with a diameter of 50 mm (1.969 in), is used to penetrate the soil at a standard rate of 1.25 mm/minute.

Although the force increases with the depth of penetration, in most cases, it does not increase as quickly as it does for the standard crushed rock, so the ratio decreases. In some cases, the ratio at 5 mm may be greater than that at 2.5 mm. If this occurs, the ratio at 5 mm should be used. The CBR measures a material's resistance to penetration of a standard plunger under controlled density and moisture conditions. The test procedure should be strictly adhered to if a high degree of reproducibility is desired. The CBR test may be conducted on a remolded or undisturbed specimen in the laboratory. The test is simple and has been extensively investigated for field correlations of flexible pavement thickness requirements.

The laboratory CBR apparatus consists of a mould of 150 mm diameter with a base plate and a collar, a loading frame and dial gauges for measuring the penetration values and the expansion on soaking. If a soaked (wet) measurement is desired, the specimen in the mould is soaked in water for four days and the swelling and water absorption values are noted. The surcharge weight is placed on the top of the specimen in the mould and the assembly is placed under the plunger of the loading frame.

== Example values ==
CBR values for common soil subgrades can be estimated according to the USC soil types, for example: clay around 2%, sand from 7% (poorly graded) to 10% (well graded), well graded sandy gravel 15%, clayey sand 5-20%, silty gravel 20-60%, gravel from 30-60% poorly-graded to 40-80% if well-graded.

== Dynamic CBR and advanced testing approaches ==
Recent research has extended the application of the California bearing ratio (CBR) test by linking its results to fundamental material properties and realistic field conditions. Studies have demonstrated strong correlations between dynamic CBR values and compaction parameters such as dry density and moisture content, improving the reliability of CBR-based evaluations for pavement design.

== The influence of compaction and environmental conditions on CBR values ==
Factors influencing the CBR value have been investigated by many researchers on a variety of soils. Research has shown that compaction conditions play a critical role in improving the strength and load-bearing capacity of soils, particularly for fine-grained and gypsiferous materials. Increased compaction has been found to enhance soil structure and reduce compressibility, leading to higher CBR values and improved performance in pavement applications.

Environmental factors, particularly moisture variation and long-term soaking, have also been shown to significantly influence CBR values. In gypsiferous and clayey soils, the dissolution of soluble salts during soaking can lead to a reduction in soil strength and stiffness, thereby decreasing the CBR value over time.

These findings highlight the importance of considering both compaction practices and environmental conditions in the design and evaluation of pavement subgrades, particularly in regions where gypsiferous soils are present. Appropriate compaction and material selection are essential to ensure long-term stability and performance of road structures.
