= Soil mechanics =

Branch of soil physics and applied mechanics that describes the behavior of soils

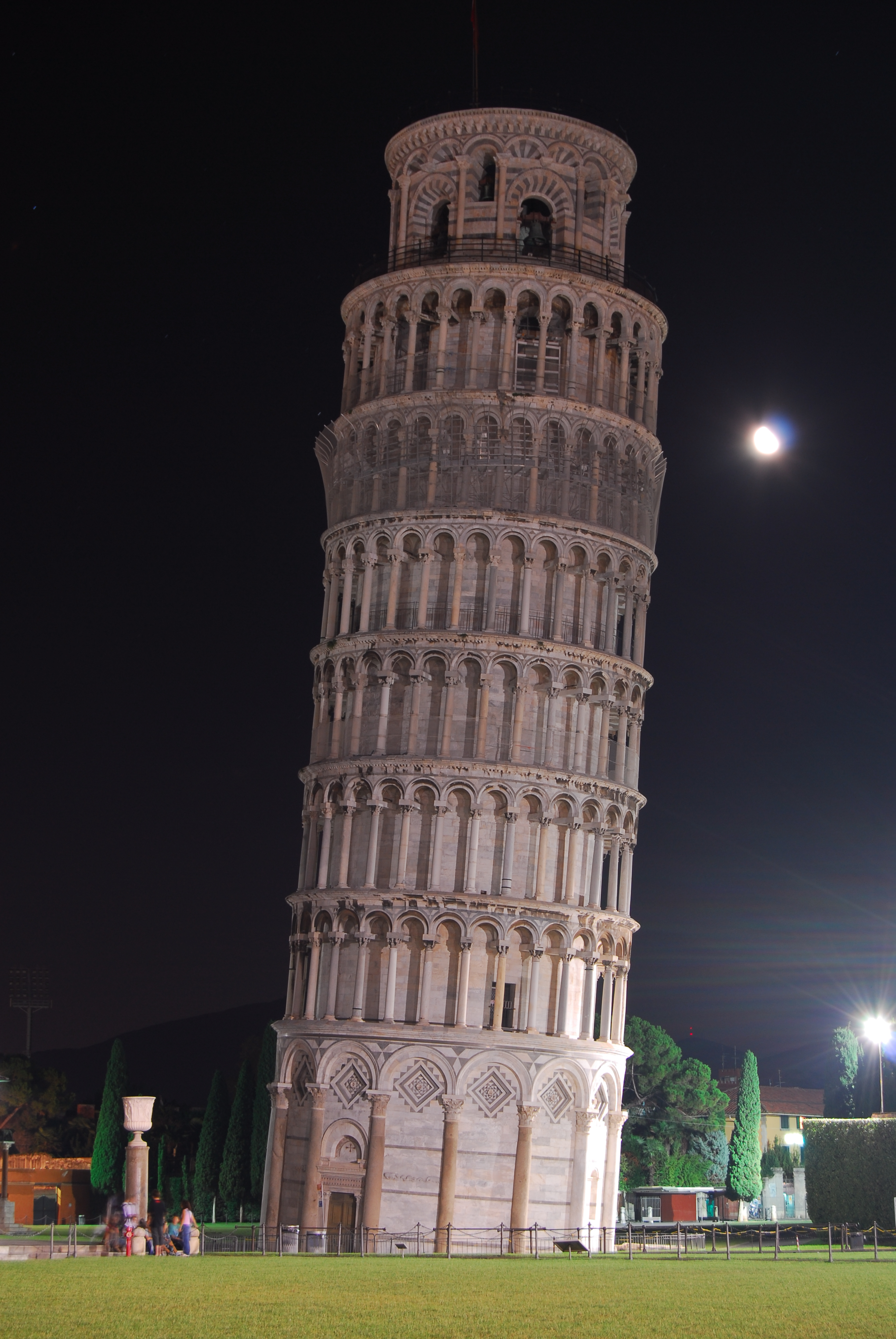
The Leaning Tower of Pisa – an example of a problem due to deformation of soil

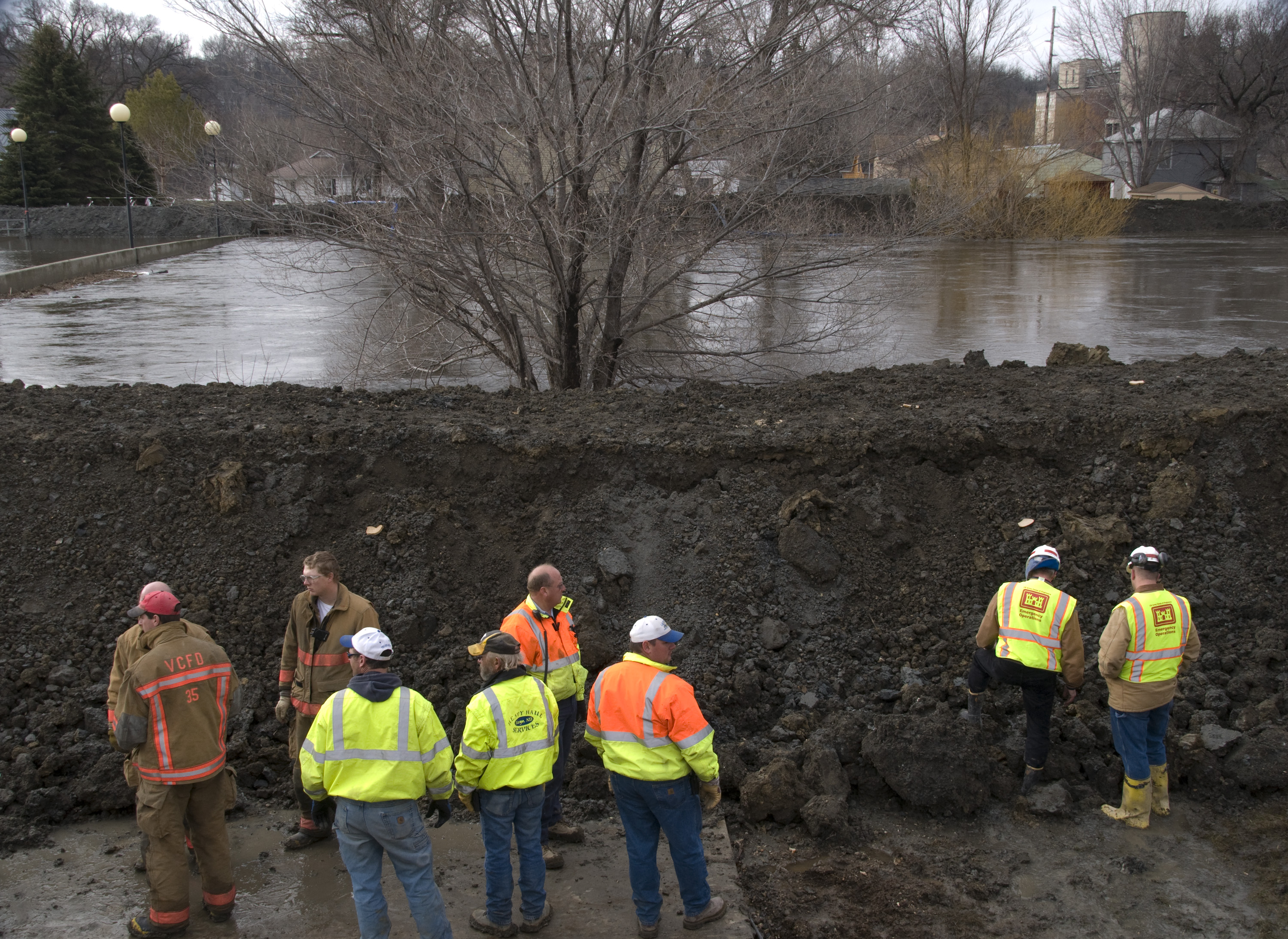
Slope instability issues for a temporary flood control levee in North Dakota, 2009

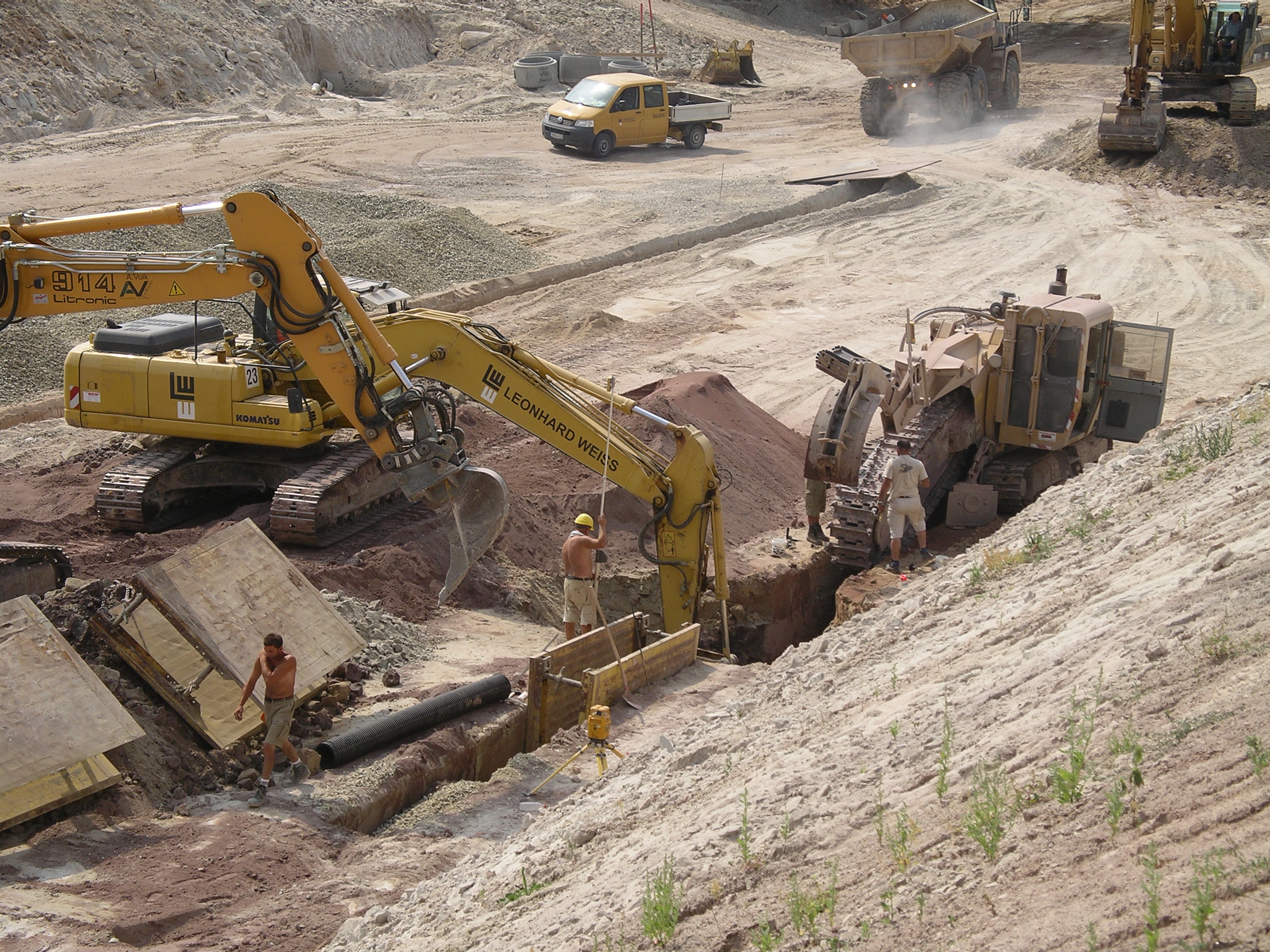
Earthwork in Germany

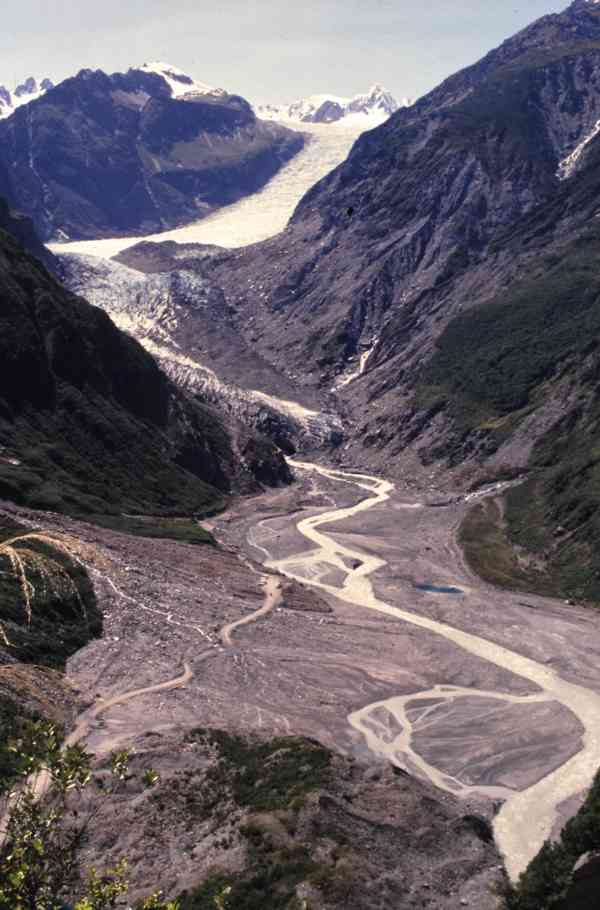
Fox Glacier, New Zealand: Soil produced and transported by intense weathering and erosion

Soil mechanics is a branch of soil physics and applied mechanics that describes the behavior of soils. It differs from fluid mechanics and solid mechanics in the sense that soils consist of a heterogeneous mixture of fluids (usually air and water) and particles (usually clay, silt, sand, and gravel) but soil also contains organic solids and other matter. Along with rock mechanics, soil mechanics provides the theoretical basis for analysis in geotechnical engineering, a subdiscipline of civil engineering, and engineering geology, a subdiscipline of geology. Soil mechanics is used to analyze the deformations of and flow of fluids within natural and man-made structures that are supported on or made of soil, or structures that are buried in soils. Example applications are building and bridge foundations, retaining walls, dams, and buried pipeline systems. Principles of soil mechanics are also used in related disciplines such as geophysical engineering, coastal engineering, agricultural engineering, and hydrology.

This article describes the genesis and composition of soil, the distinction between pore water pressure and inter-granular effective stress, capillary action of fluids in the soil pore spaces, soil classification, seepage and permeability, time dependent change of volume due to squeezing water out of tiny pore spaces, also known as consolidation, shear strength and stiffness of soils. The shear strength of soils is primarily derived from friction between the particles and interlocking, which are very sensitive to the effective stress. The article concludes with some examples of applications of the principles of soil mechanics such as slope stability, lateral earth pressure on retaining walls, and bearing capacity of foundations.

== Genesis and composition of soils ==
=== Genesis ===
The primary mechanism of creation is the weathering of rock. All rock types (igneous rock, metamorphic rock and sedimentary rock) may be broken down into small particles to create soil. Weathering mechanisms are physical, chemical, and biological. Human activities such as excavation, blasting, and waste disposal, may also create soil, suggesting that human activities during the Anthropocene could be considered as the sixth soil-forming factor. Over geologic time, deeply buried soils may be altered by pressure and temperature to become metamorphic or sedimentary rock, and if melted and solidified again, they would complete the geologic cycle by becoming igneous rock.

Physical weathering includes temperature effects, freeze and thaw of water in cracks, rain, wind, impact and other mechanisms, to which must be added the grinding of mineral particles by soil animals. Chemical weathering includes dissolution of minerals composing a rock and precipitation in the form of another mineral. Clay minerals, for example can be formed by weathering of feldspar, which is the most common mineral present in igneous rock. Biological weathering includes the secretion of organic acids by root tips and fungal hyphae, and the production of siderophores and other metal-chelating compounds by bacteria. All these weathering processes contribute to soil formation, at a rate averaging 0.0056 cm depth of soil formed every year.

The most common mineral constituent of silt and sand is quartz, composed of silica, which has the chemical name silicon dioxide. The reason that feldspar is most common in rocks but silica is more prevalent in soils is that feldspar is much more soluble than silica.

Silt, Sand, and Gravel are basically little pieces of broken rocks. According to the Unified Soil Classification System, silt particle sizes are in the range of 0.002 mm to 0.075 mm and sand particles have sizes in the range of 0.075 mm to 4.75 mm. Gravel particles are broken pieces of rock in the size range 4.75 mm to 100 mm. Particles larger than gravel are called cobbles and boulders.

=== Transport ===
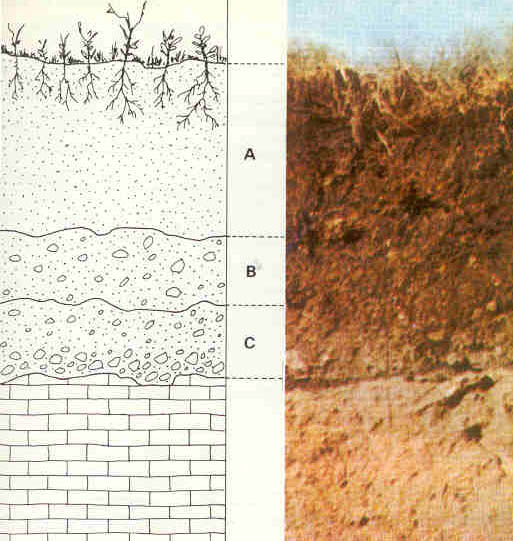
Example soil horizons. a) topsoil and colluvium b) mature residual soil c) young residual soil d) weathered rock

Soil deposits are affected by the mechanism of transport and deposition to their location. Soils that are not transported are called residual soils: they exist at the same location as the rock from which they were generated. Decomposed granite (grus) is a common example of a residual soil. The common mechanisms of transport are the actions of gravity, ice, water, and wind. Wind blown soils include dune sands and loess. Water carries particles of different size depending on the speed of the water, thus soils transported by water are graded according to their size. Silt and clay may settle out in a lake, and gravel and sand collect at the bottom of a river bed. Wind blown soil deposits (aeolian soils) also tend to be sorted according to their grain size. Erosion at the base of glaciers is powerful enough to pick up large rocks and boulders as well as soil, forming unsorted glacial sediment called till. Soils dropped by melting ice can be a well graded mixture of widely varying particle sizes. Gravity on its own may also carry particles down from the top of a mountain to make a pile of soil and boulders at the base; soil deposits transported by gravity are called colluvium.

The mechanism of transport also has a major effect on the particle shape. For example, low velocity grinding in a river bed will produce rounded particles downstream. Freshly fractured colluvium particles often have a very angular shape.

=== Soil composition ===
==== Soil mineralogy ====
Silts, sands and gravels are classified by their size, and hence they may consist of a variety of minerals. Owing to the stability of quartz compared to other rock minerals, quartz is the most common constituent of sand and silt. Mica and feldspar are other common minerals present in sands and silts. The mineral constituents of gravel may be more similar to that of the parent rock.

The common clay minerals are montmorillonite, smectite, illite, and kaolinite. These minerals tend to form in sheet or plate like structures, with length typically ranging between 10^{−7} m and 4×10^{−6} m and thickness typically ranging between 10^{−9} m and 2×10^{−6} m, and they have a relatively large specific surface area. The specific surface area (SSA) is defined as the ratio of the surface area of particles to the mass of the particles. Clay minerals typically have specific surface areas in the range of 10 to 1,000 square meters per gram of solid. Due to the large surface area available for chemical, electrostatic, and van der Waals interaction, the mechanical behavior of clay minerals is very sensitive to the amount of pore fluid available and the type and amount of dissolved ions in the pore fluid.

The minerals of soils are predominantly formed by atoms of oxygen, silicon, hydrogen, and aluminium, organized in various crystalline forms. These elements along with calcium, sodium, potassium, magnesium, and carbon constitute over 99 per cent of the solid mass of soils.

==== Grain size distribution ====
Soils consist of a mixture of particles of different size, shape and mineralogy. Because the size of the particles obviously has a significant effect on the soil behavior, the grain size and grain size distribution are used to classify soils. The grain size distribution (also called soil texture) describes the relative proportions of particles of various sizes. The grain size is often visualized in a cumulative distribution graph which, for example, plots the percentage of particles finer than a given size as a function of size. The median grain size, $D_{50}$, is the size for which 50% of the particle mass consists of finer particles. Soil behavior, especially the hydraulic conductivity, tends to be dominated by the smaller particles, hence, the term "effective size", denoted by $D_{10}$, is defined as the size for which 10% of the particle mass consists of finer particles.

Sands and gravels that possess a wide range of particle sizes with a smooth distribution of particle sizes are called well graded soils. If the soil particles in a sample are predominantly in a relatively narrow range of sizes, the sample is uniformly graded. If a soil sample has distinct gaps in the gradation curve, e.g., a mixture of gravel and fine sand, with no coarse sand, the sample may be gap graded. Uniformly graded and gap graded soils are both considered to be poorly graded. There are many methods for measuring particle-size distribution. The two traditional methods are sieve analysis and hydrometer analysis.

===== Sieve analysis =====
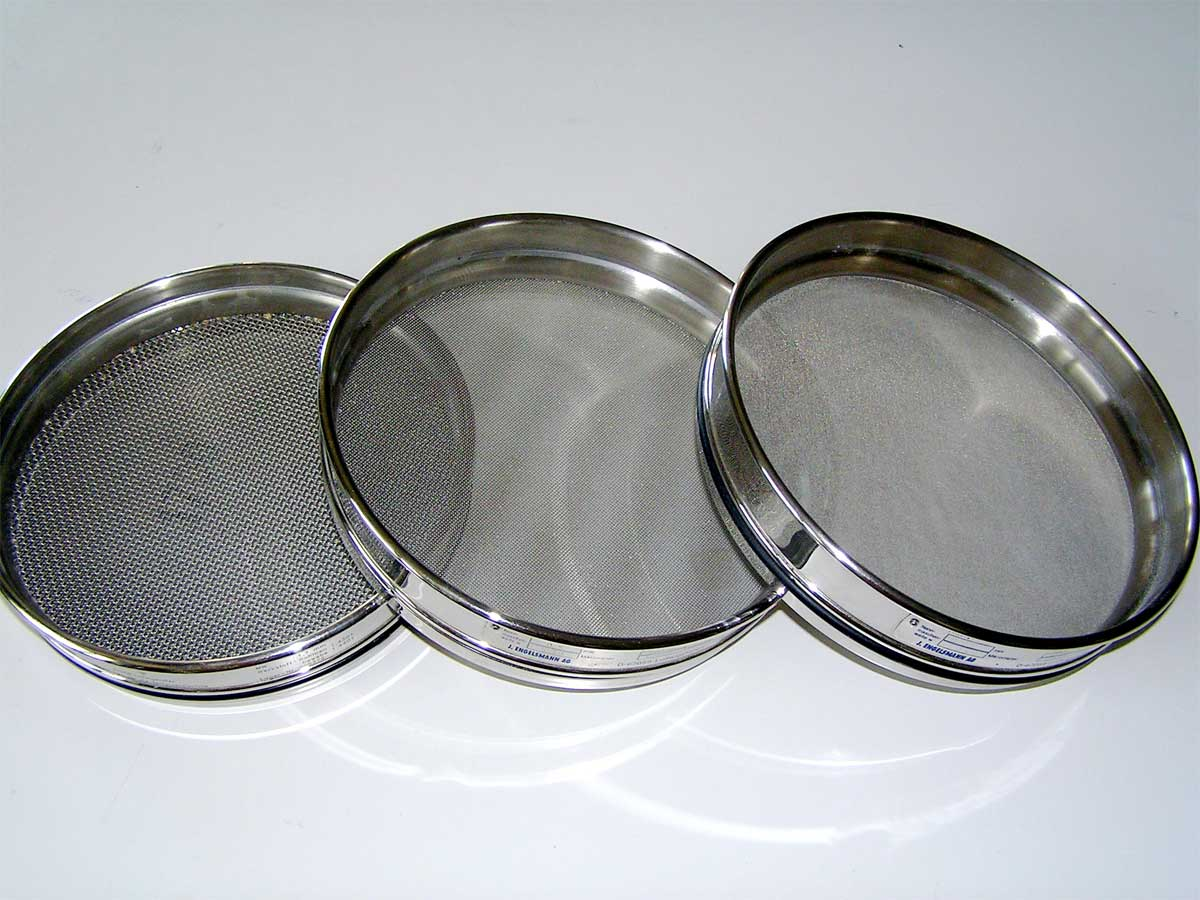
Sieve

The size distribution of gravel and sand particles is typically measured using sieve analysis. The formal procedure is described in ASTM D6913-04(2009). A stack of sieves with accurately dimensioned holes between a mesh of wires is used to separate the particles into size bins. A known volume of dried soil, with clods broken down to individual particles, is put into the top of a stack of sieves arranged from coarse to fine. The stack of sieves is shaken for a standard period of time so that the particles are sorted into size bins. This method works reasonably well for particles in the sand and gravel size range. Fine particles tend to stick to each other, and hence the sieving process is not an effective method. If there are a lot of fines (silt and clay) present in the soil it may be necessary to run water through the sieves to wash the coarse particles and clods through.

A variety of sieve sizes are available. The boundary between sand and silt is arbitrary. According to the Unified Soil Classification System, a #4 sieve (4 openings per inch) having 4.75 mm opening size separates sand from gravel and a #200 sieve with an 0.075 mm opening separates sand from silt and clay. According to the British standard, 0.063 mm is the boundary between sand and silt, and 2 mm is the boundary between sand and gravel.

===== Hydrometer analysis =====
The classification of fine-grained soils, i.e., soils that are finer than sand, is determined primarily by their Atterberg limits, not by their grain size. If it is important to determine the grain size distribution of fine-grained soils, the hydrometer test may be performed. In the hydrometer tests, the soil particles are mixed with water and shaken to produce a dilute suspension in a glass cylinder, and then the cylinder is left to sit. A hydrometer is used to measure the density of the suspension as a function of time. Clay particles may take several hours to settle past the depth of measurement of the hydrometer. Sand particles may take less than a second. Stokes' law provides the theoretical basis to calculate the relationship between sedimentation velocity and particle size. ASTM provides the detailed procedures for performing the hydrometer test.

Clay particles can be sufficiently small that they never settle because they are kept in suspension by Brownian motion, in which case they may be classified as colloids.

==== Mass-volume relations ====
A phase diagram of soil indicating the masses and volumes of air, solid, water, and voids

There are a variety of parameters used to describe the relative proportions of air, water and solid in a soil. This section defines these parameters and some of their interrelationships. The basic notation is as follows:

$V_a$, $V_w$, and $V_s$ represent the volumes of air, water and solids in a soil mixture;

$W_a$, $W_w$, and $W_s$ represent the weights of air, water and solids in a soil mixture;

$M_a$, $M_w$, and $M_s$ represent the masses of air, water and solids in a soil mixture;

$\rho_a$, $\rho_w$, and $\rho_s$ represent the densities of the constituents (air, water and solids) in a soil mixture;

Note that the weights, W, can be obtained by multiplying the mass, M, by the acceleration due to gravity, g; e.g., $W_s = M_s g$

Specific Gravity is the ratio of the density of one material compared to the density of pure water ($\rho_w = 1 g/cm^3$).

Specific gravity of solids, $G_s = \frac{\rho_s} {\rho_w}$

Note that specific weight, conventionally denoted by the symbol $\gamma$ may be obtained by multiplying the density ( $\rho$ ) of a material by the acceleration due to gravity, $g$.

Density, bulk density, or wet density, $\rho$, are different names for the density of the mixture, i.e., the total mass of air, water, solids divided by the total volume of air water and solids (the mass of air is assumed to be zero for practical purposes):

$$\rho = \frac{M_s + M_w}{V_s + V_w + V_a}= \frac{M_t}{V_t}$$

Dry density, $\rho _d$, is the mass of solids divided by the total volume of air water and solids:

$$\rho_d = \frac{M_s}{V_s + V_w + V_a}= \frac{M_s}{V_t}$$

Buoyant density, $\rho '$, defined as the density of the mixture minus the density of water is useful if the soil is submerged under water:

$$\rho ' = \rho\ - \rho _w$$

where $\rho _w$ is the density of water

Water content, $w$ is the ratio of mass of water to mass of solid. It is easily measured by weighing a sample of the soil, drying it out in an oven and re-weighing. Standard procedures are described by ASTM.

$$w = \frac{M_w}{M_s} = \frac{W_w}{W_s}$$

Void ratio, $e$, is the ratio of the volume of voids to the volume of solids:

$$e = \frac{V_v}{V_s} = \frac{V_v}{V_t - V_v} = \frac{n}{1 - n}$$

Porosity, $n$, is the ratio of volume of voids to the total volume, and is related to the void ratio:

$$n = \frac{V_v}{V_t} = \frac{V_v}{V_s + V_v}= \frac{e}{1 + e}$$

Degree of saturation, $S$, is the ratio of the volume of water to the volume of voids:

$$S = \frac{V_w}{V_v}$$

From the above definitions, some useful relationships can be derived by use of basic algebra.

$$\rho = \frac{(G_s+Se)\rho_w}{1+e}$$

$$\rho = \frac{(1+w)G_s\rho_w}{1+e}$$

$$w = \frac{S e}{G_s}$$

== Soil classification ==
Geotechnical engineers classify the soil particle types by performing tests on disturbed (dried, passed through sieves, and remolded) samples of the soil. This provides information about the characteristics of the soil grains themselves. However, tests on soil texture do not account for important effects of the structure or fabric of the soil, terms that describe compactness of the particles and patterns in their arrangement in a load carrying framework, as well as pore size and pore fluid distributions. Engineering geologists also classify soils based on their genesis and depositional history.

=== Classification of soil grains ===
In the US and other countries, the Unified Soil Classification System (USCS) is often used for soil classification. Other classification systems include the British Standard BS 5930 and the AASHTO soil classification system.

==== Classification of sands and gravels ====
In the USCS, gravels (given the symbol G) and sands (given the symbol S) are classified according to their grain size distribution. For the USCS, gravels may be given the classification symbol GW (well-graded gravel), GP (poorly graded gravel), GM (gravel with a large amount of silt), or GC (gravel with a large amount of clay). Likewise sands may be classified as being SW, SP, SM or SC. Sands and gravels with a small but non-negligible amount of fines (5–12%) may be given a dual classification such as SW-SC.

==== Atterberg limits ====
Clays and silts, often called 'fine-grained soils', are classified according to their Atterberg limits. The most commonly used Atterberg limits are the liquid limit (denoted by LL or $w_l$), plastic limit (denoted by PL or $w_p$), and shrinkage limit (denoted by SL).

The liquid limit is the water content at which the soil behavior transitions from a plastic solid to a liquid. The plastic limit is the water content at which the soil behavior transitions from that of a plastic solid to a brittle solid. The shrinkage limit corresponds to a water content below which the soil will not shrink as it dries. The consistency of a fine grained soil varies in proportion to its water content.

As the transitions from one state to another are gradual, the tests have adopted arbitrary definitions to determine the boundaries of the states. The liquid limit is determined by measuring the water content for which a groove closes after 25 blows in a standard test. Alternatively, a fall cone test apparatus may be used to measure the liquid limit. The undrained shear strength of remolded soil at the liquid limit is approximately 2 kPa. The plastic limit is the water content below which it is not possible to roll by hand the soil into 3 mm diameter cylinders. The soil cracks or breaks up as it is rolled down to this diameter. Remolded soil at the plastic limit is quite stiff, having an undrained shear strength of the order of about 200 kPa.

The plasticity index of a particular soil specimen is defined as the difference between the liquid limit and the plastic limit of the specimen; it is an indicator of how much water the soil particles in the specimen can absorb, and correlates with many engineering properties like permeability, compressibility, shear strength and others. Generally, the clay having high plasticity have lower permeability and also they are also difficult to be compacted.

==== Classification of silts and clays ====
According to the Unified Soil Classification System (USCS), silts and clays are classified by plotting the values of their plasticity index and liquid limit on a plasticity chart. The A-Line on the chart separates clays (given the USCS symbol C) from silts (given the symbol M). LL=50% separates high plasticity soils (given the modifier symbol H) from low plasticity soils (given the modifier symbol L). A soil that plots above the A-line and has LL>50% would, for example, be classified as CH. Other possible classifications of silts and clays are ML, CL and MH. If the Atterberg limits plot in the "hatched" region on the graph near the origin, the soils are given the dual classification 'CL-ML'.

=== Indices related to soil strength ===
==== Liquidity index ====
The effects of the water content on the strength of saturated remolded soils can be quantified by the use of the liquidity index, LI:

$$LI = \frac{w-PL}{LL-PL}$$

When the LI is 1, remolded soil is at the liquid limit and it has an undrained shear strength of about 2 kPa. When the soil is at the plastic limit, the LI is 0 and the undrained shear strength is about 200 kPa.

==== Relative density ====
The density of sands (cohesionless soils) is often characterized by the relative density, $D_r$

$$D_r= \frac{e_{max} - e}{e_{max} - e_{min}} 100\%$$

where: $e_{max}$ is the "maximum void ratio" corresponding to a very loose state, $e_{min}$ is the "minimum void ratio" corresponding to a very dense state and $e$ is the in situ void ratio. Methods used to calculate relative density are defined in ASTM D4254-00(2016).

Thus if $D_r = 100\%$ the sand or gravel is very dense, and if $D_r = 0\%$ the soil is extremely loose and unstable.

== Seepage: steady state flow of water ==
A cross section showing the water table varying with surface topography as well as a perched water table

In soil mechanics, seepage is the movement of water through soil. If fluid pressures in a soil deposit are uniformly increasing with depth according to $u = \rho_w g z_w$, where $z_w$ is the depth below the water table, then hydrostatic conditions will prevail and the fluids will not be flowing through the soil. However, if the water table is sloping or there is a perched water table, as indicated in the accompanying sketch, then seepage will occur. For steady state seepage, the seepage velocities are not varying with time. If the water tables are changing levels with time, or if the soil is in the process of consolidation, then steady state conditions do not apply.

== Effective stress and capillarity: hydrostatic conditions ==
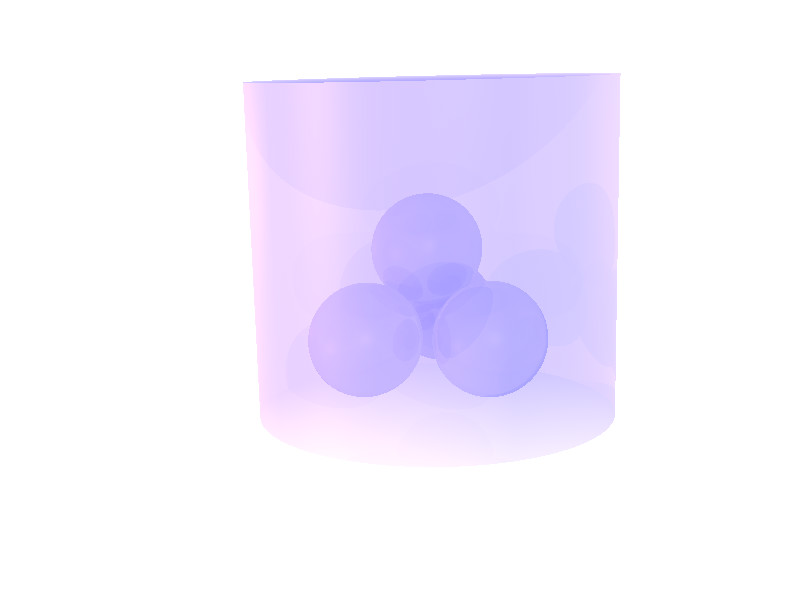
Spheres immersed in water, reducing effective stress

To understand the mechanics of soils it is necessary to understand how normal stresses and shear stresses are shared by the different phases. Neither gas nor liquid provide significant resistance to shear stress. The shear resistance of soil is provided by friction and interlocking of the particles. The friction depends on the intergranular contact stresses between solid particles. The normal stresses, on the other hand, are shared by the fluid and the particles. Although the pore air is relatively compressible, and hence takes little normal stress in most geotechnical problems, liquid water is relatively incompressible and if the voids are saturated with water, the pore water must be squeezed out in order to pack the particles closer together.

The principle of effective stress, introduced by Karl Terzaghi, states that the effective stress σ' (i.e., the average intergranular stress between solid particles) may be calculated by a simple subtraction of the pore pressure from the total stress:

$\sigma' = \sigma - u\,$

where σ is the total stress and u is the pore pressure. It is not practical to measure σ' directly, so in practice the vertical effective stress is calculated from the pore pressure and vertical total stress. The distinction between the terms pressure and stress is also important. By definition, pressure at a point is equal in all directions but stresses at a point can be different in different directions. In soil mechanics, compressive stresses and pressures are considered to be positive and tensile stresses are considered to be negative, which is different from the solid mechanics sign convention for stress.

=== Total stress ===
For level ground conditions, the total vertical stress at a point, $\sigma_v$, on average, is the weight of everything above that point per unit area. The vertical stress beneath a uniform surface layer with density $\rho$, and thickness $H$ is for example:

$$\sigma_v = \rho g H = \gamma H$$

where $g$ is the acceleration due to gravity, and $\gamma$ is the unit weight of the overlying layer. If there are multiple layers of soil or water above the point of interest, the vertical stress may be calculated by summing the product of the unit weight and thickness of all of the overlying layers. Total stress increases with increasing depth in proportion to the density of the overlying soil.

It is not possible to calculate the horizontal total stress in this way. Lateral earth pressures are addressed elsewhere.

=== Pore water pressure ===
==== Hydrostatic conditions ====
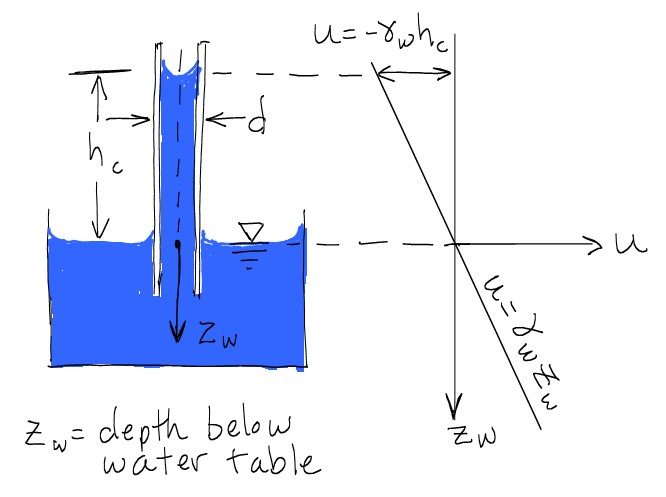
Water is drawn into a small tube by surface tension. Water pressure, u, is negative above and positive below the free water surface.

If the soil pores are filled with water that is not flowing but is static, the pore water pressures will be hydrostatic. The water table is located at the depth where the water pressure is equal to the atmospheric pressure. For hydrostatic conditions, the water pressure increases linearly with depth below the water table:

$$u = \rho_w g z_w$$

where $\rho_w$ is the density of water, and $z_w$ is the depth below the water table.

==== Capillary action ====
Due to surface tension, water will rise up in a small capillary tube above a free surface of water. Likewise, water will rise up above the water table into the small pore spaces around the soil particles. In fact the soil may be completely saturated for some distance above the water table. Above the height of capillary saturation, the soil may be wet but the water content will decrease with elevation. If the water in the capillary zone is not moving, the water pressure obeys the equation of hydrostatic equilibrium, $u = \rho_w g z_w$, but note that $z_w$, is negative above the water table. Hence, hydrostatic water pressures are negative above the water table. The thickness of the zone of capillary saturation depends on the pore size, but typically, the heights vary between a centimeter or so for coarse sand to tens of meters for a silt or clay. In fact the pore space of soil is a uniform fractal e.g. a set of uniformly distributed D-dimensional fractals of average linear size L. For the clay soil it has been found that L=0.15 mm and D=2.7.

The surface tension of water explains why the water does not drain out of a wet sand castle or a moist ball of clay. Negative water pressures make the water stick to the particles and pull the particles to each other, friction at the particle contacts make a sand castle stable. But as soon as a wet sand castle is submerged below a free water surface, the negative pressures are lost and the castle collapses. Considering the effective stress equation, $\sigma' = \sigma - u,$ if the water pressure is negative, the effective stress may be positive, even on a free surface (a surface where the total normal stress is zero). The negative pore pressure pulls the particles together and causes compressive particle to particle contact forces. Negative pore pressures in clayey soil can be much more powerful than those in sand. Negative pore pressures explain why clay soils shrink when they dry and swell as they are wetted. The swelling and shrinkage can cause major distress, especially to light structures and roads.

Later sections of this article address the pore water pressures for seepage and consolidation problems.

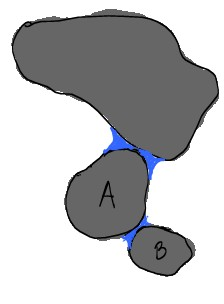
Water at particle contacts

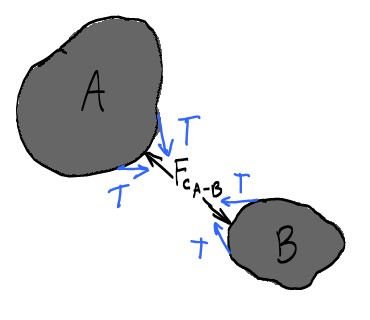
Intergranular contact force due to surface tension

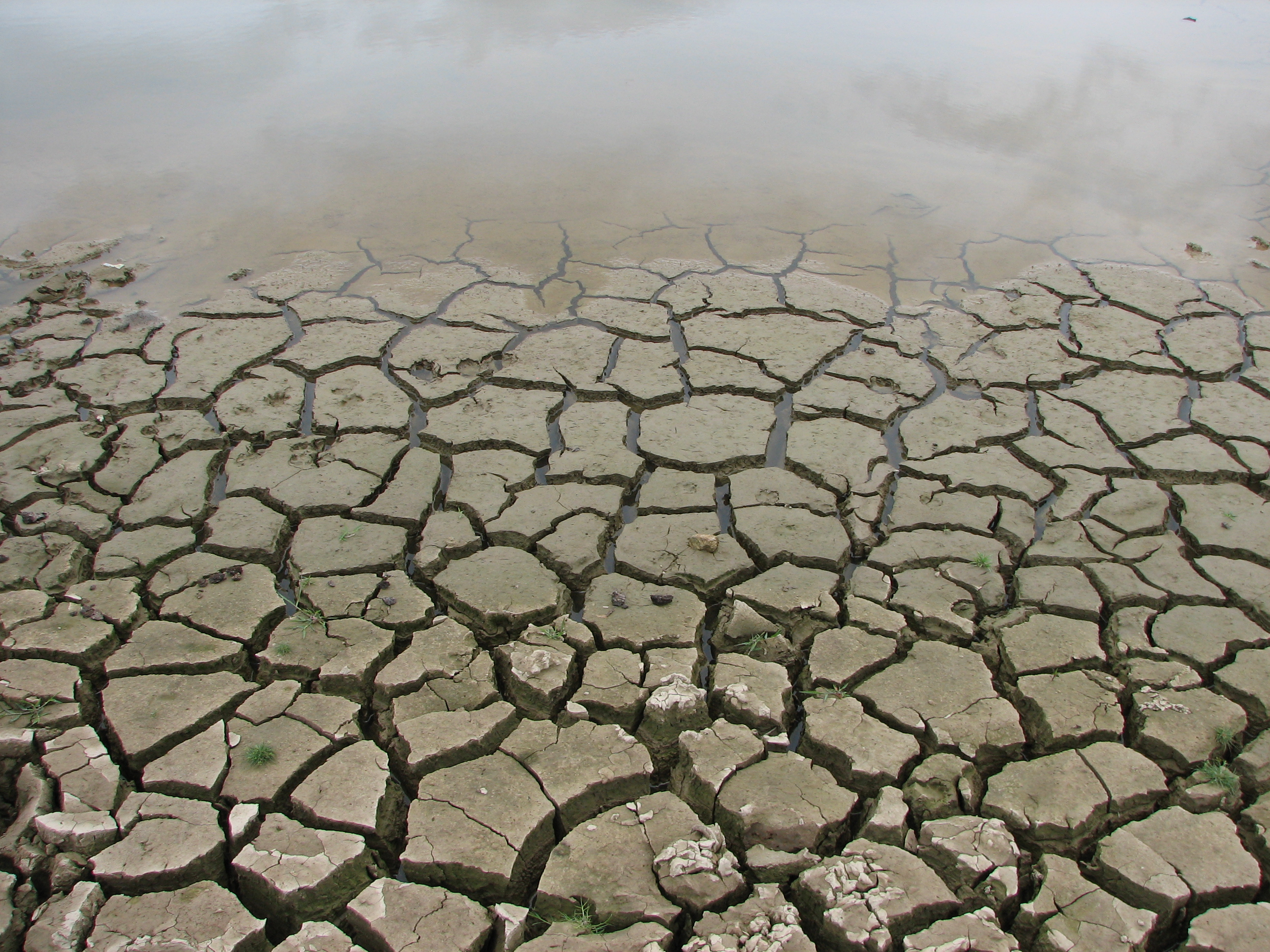
Shrinkage caused by drying

== Consolidation: transient flow of water ==
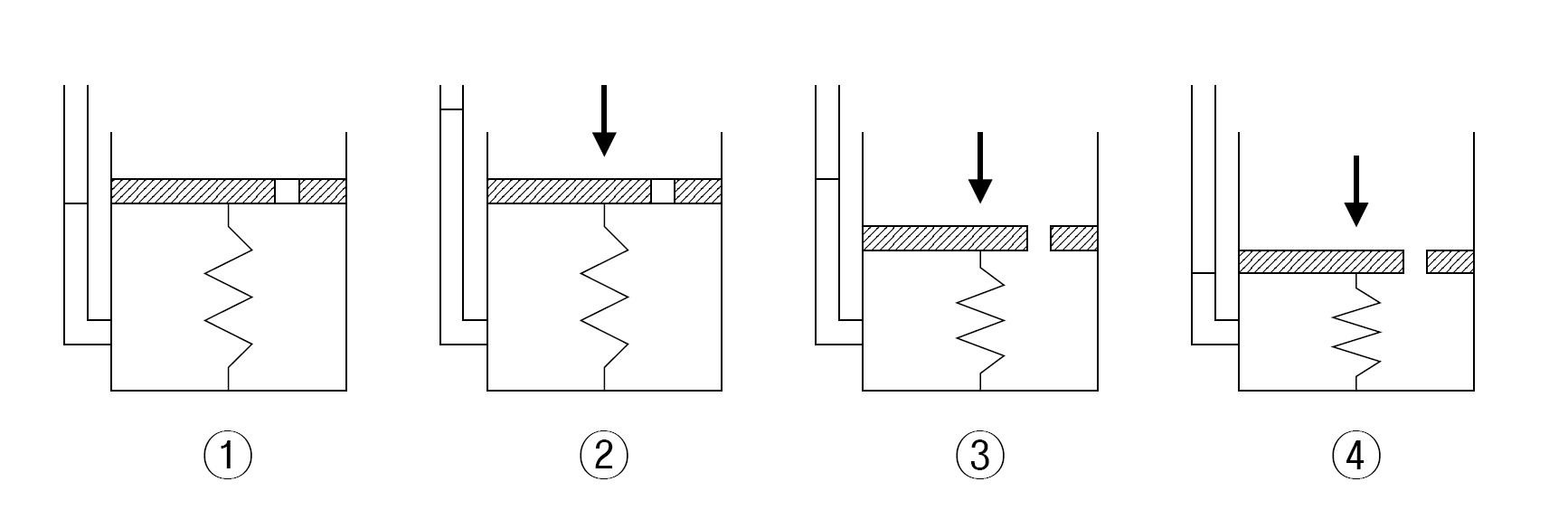
Consolidation analogy. The piston is supported by water underneath and a spring. When a load is applied to the piston, water pressure increases to support the load. As the water slowly leaks through the small hole, the load is transferred from the water pressure to the spring force.

Consolidation is a process by which soils decrease in volume. It occurs when stress is applied to a soil that causes the soil particles to pack together more tightly, therefore reducing volume by releasing intercalary air and water. When this occurs in a soil that is saturated with water, water will be squeezed out of the soil. The time required to squeeze the water out of a thick deposit of clayey soil layer might be years while for a layer of sand, the water may be squeezed out in a matter of seconds. A building foundation or construction of a new embankment will cause the soil below to consolidate and this will cause settlement which in turn may cause distress to the building or embankment. Karl Terzaghi developed the theory of one-dimensional consolidation which enables prediction of the amount of settlement and the time required for the settlement to occur. Maurice Biot fully developed the three-dimensional soil consolidation theory, extending the one-dimensional model previously developed by Terzaghi to more general hypotheses and introducing the set of basic equations of Poroelasticity. Soils are tested with an oedometer test to determine their compression index and coefficient of consolidation.

When stress is removed from a consolidated soil, the soil will rebound, drawing water back into the pores and regaining some of the volume it had lost in the consolidation process. If the stress is reapplied, the soil will re-consolidate again along a recompression curve, defined by the recompression index. Soil that has been consolidated to a large pressure and has been subsequently unloaded is considered to be overconsolidated. The maximum past vertical effective stress is termed the preconsolidation stress. A soil which is currently experiencing the maximum past vertical effective stress is said to be normally consolidated. The overconsolidation ratio, (OCR) is the ratio of the maximum past vertical effective stress to the current vertical effective stress. The OCR is significant for two reasons: firstly, because the compressibility of normally consolidated soil is significantly larger than that for overconsolidated soil, and secondly, the shear behavior and dilatancy of clayey soil are related to the OCR through critical state soil mechanics; highly overconsolidated clayey soils are dilatant, while normally consolidated soils tend to be contractive.

== Shear behavior: stiffness and strength ==
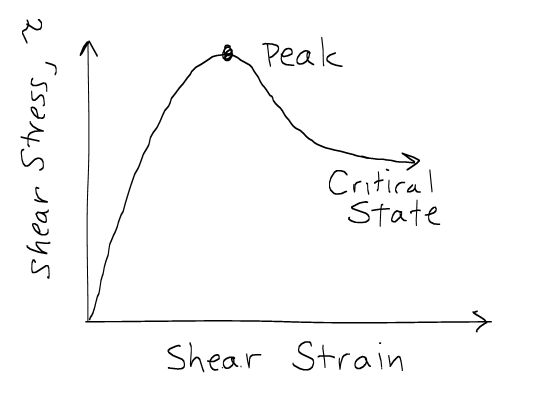
Typical stress strain curve for a drained dilatant soil

The shear strength and stiffness of soil determine whether or not soil will be stable or how much it will deform. Knowledge of the strength is necessary to determine if a slope will be stable, if a building or bridge might settle too far into the ground, and the limiting pressures on a retaining wall. It is important to distinguish between failure of a soil element and the failure of a geotechnical structure (e.g., a building foundation, slope or retaining wall); some soil elements may reach their peak strength prior to failure of the structure. Different criteria can be used to define the "shear strength" and the "yield point" for a soil element from a stress–strain curve. One may define the peak shear strength as the peak of a stress–strain curve, or the shear strength at critical state as the value after large strains when the shear resistance levels off. If the stress–strain curve does not stabilize before the end of shear strength test, the "strength" is sometimes considered to be the shear resistance at 15–20% strain. The shear strength of soil depends on many factors including the effective stress and the void ratio.

The shear stiffness is important, for example, for evaluation of the magnitude of deformations of foundations and slopes prior to failure and because it is related to the shear wave velocity. The slope of the initial, nearly linear, portion of a plot of shear stress as a function of shear strain is called the shear modulus.

=== Friction, interlocking and dilation ===
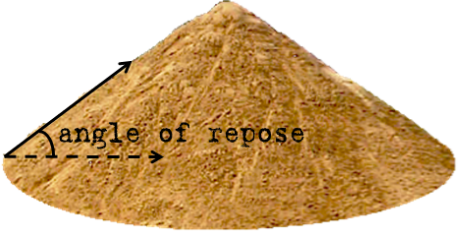
Angle of repose

Soil is an assemblage of particles that have little to no cementation while rock (such as sandstone) may consist of an assembly of particles that are strongly cemented together by chemical bonds. The shear strength of soil is primarily due to interparticle friction and therefore, the shear resistance on a plane is approximately proportional to the effective normal stress on that plane. The angle of internal friction is thus closely related to the maximum stable slope angle, often called the angle of repose.

But in addition to friction, soil derives significant shear resistance from interlocking of grains. If the grains are densely packed, the grains tend to spread apart from each other as they are subject to shear strain. The expansion of the particle matrix due to shearing was called dilatancy by Osborne Reynolds. If one considers the energy required to shear an assembly of particles there is energy input by the shear force, T, moving a distance, × and there is also energy input by the normal force, N, as the sample expands a distance, y. Due to the extra energy required for the particles to dilate against the confining pressures, dilatant soils have a greater peak strength than contractive soils. Furthermore, as dilative soil grains dilate, they become looser (their void ratio increases), and their rate of dilation decreases until they reach a critical void ratio. Contractive soils become denser as they shear, and their rate of contraction decreases until they reach a critical void ratio.

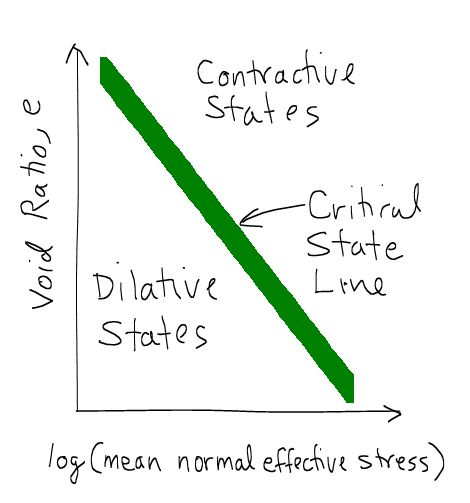
A critical state line separates the dilatant and contractive states for soil.

The tendency for a soil to dilate or contract depends primarily on the confining pressure and the void ratio of the soil. The rate of dilation is high if the confining pressure is small and the void ratio is small. The rate of contraction is high if the confining pressure is large and the void ratio is large. As a first approximation, the regions of contraction and dilation are separated by the critical state line.

=== Failure criteria ===
After a soil reaches the critical state, it is no longer contracting or dilating and the shear stress on the failure plane $\tau_{crit}$ is determined by the effective normal stress on the failure plane $\sigma_n '$ and critical state friction angle $\phi_{crit} '\$:

$$\tau_{crit} = \sigma_n ' \tan \phi_{crit} '\$$

The peak strength of the soil may be greater, however, due to the interlocking (dilatancy) contribution. This may be stated:

$$\tau_{peak} = \sigma_n ' \tan \phi_{peak} '\$$

where $\phi_{peak}' > \phi_{crit}'$. However, use of a friction angle greater than the critical state value for design requires care. The peak strength will not be mobilized everywhere at the same time in a practical problem such as a foundation, slope or retaining wall. The critical state friction angle is not nearly as variable as the peak friction angle and hence it can be relied upon with confidence.

Not recognizing the significance of dilatancy, Coulomb proposed that the shear strength of soil may be expressed as a combination of adhesion and friction components:

$$\tau_f = c' + \sigma_f ' \tan \phi '\,$$

It is now known that the $c '$ and $\phi'$ parameters in the last equation are not fundamental soil properties. In particular, $c '$ and $\phi '$ are different depending on the magnitude of effective stress. According to Schofield (2005), the longstanding use of $c'$ in practice has led many engineers to wrongly believe that $c'$ is a fundamental parameter. This assumption that $c '$ and $\phi '$ are constant can lead to overestimation of peak strengths.

=== Structure, fabric, and chemistry ===
In addition to the friction and interlocking (dilatancy) components of strength, the structure and fabric also play a significant role in the soil behavior. The structure and fabric include factors such as the spacing and arrangement of the solid particles or the amount and spatial distribution of pore water. In some cases cementitious material accumulates at particle-particle contacts, as in microbially induced carbonate precipitation used to improve the mechanical properties of soil. Mechanical behavior of soil is affected by the density of the particles and their structure or arrangement of the particles as well as the amount and spatial distribution of fluids present (e.g., water and air voids). Other factors include the electrical charge of the particles, chemistry of pore water, chemical bonds (e.g. cementation of particles through a solid substance such as recrystallized calcium carbonate).

=== Drained and undrained shear ===
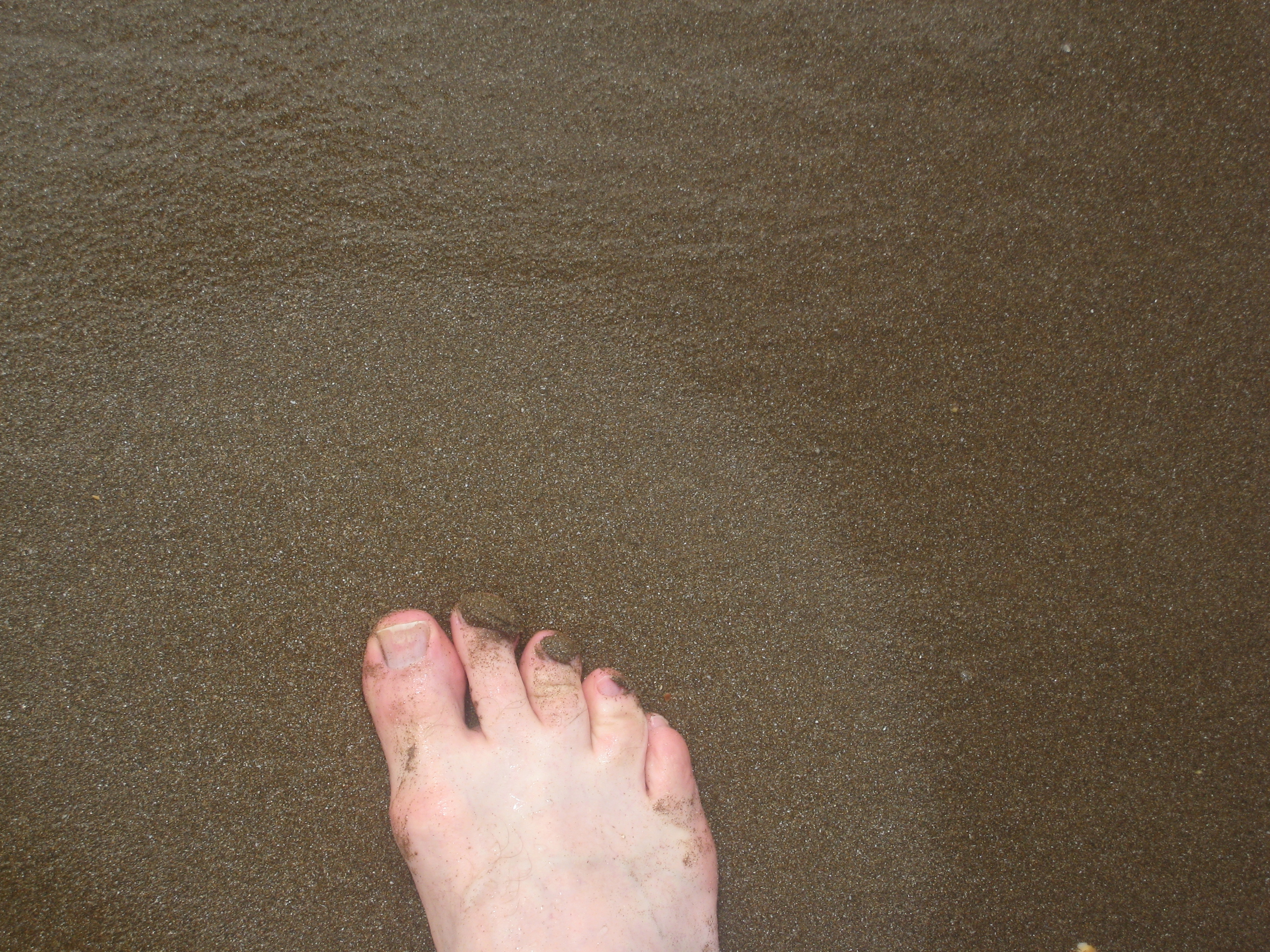
Moist sand along the shoreline is originally densely packed by the draining water. Foot pressure on the sand causes it to dilate (see: Reynolds dilatancy), drawing water from the surface into the pores.

The presence of nearly incompressible fluids such as water in the pore spaces affects the ability for the pores to dilate or contract. If the pores are saturated with water, water must be sucked into the dilating pore spaces to fill the expanding pores. Similarly, for contractive soil, water must be squeezed out of the pore spaces to allow contraction to take place.

Dilation of the voids causes negative water pressures that draw fluid into the pores, and contraction of the voids causes positive pore pressures to push the water out of the pores. If the rate of shearing is very large compared to the rate that water can be sucked into or squeezed out of the dilating or contracting pore spaces, then the shearing is called undrained shear, if the shearing is slow enough that the water pressures are negligible, the shearing is called drained shear. During undrained shear, the water pressure u changes depending on volume change tendencies. From the effective stress equation, the change in u directly effects the effective stress by the equation:

$$\sigma' = \sigma - u\,$$

and the strength is very sensitive to the effective stress. It follows then that the undrained shear strength of a soil may be smaller or larger than the drained shear strength depending upon whether the soil is contractive or dilative.

=== Shear tests ===
Strength parameters can be measured in the laboratory using direct shear test, triaxial shear test, simple shear test, fall cone test and (hand) shear vane test; there are numerous other devices and variations on these devices used in practice today. Tests conducted to characterize the strength and stiffness of the soils in the ground include the Cone penetration test and the Standard penetration test.

=== Other factors ===
The stress–strain relationship of soils, and therefore the shearing strength, is affected by:

1. soil composition (basic soil material): Mineralogy, grain size and grain size distribution, shape of particles, pore fluid type and content, ions on grain and in pore fluid.
2. state (initial): Defined by the initial void ratio, effective normal stress and shear stress (stress history). State can be described by terms such as: loose, dense, overconsolidated, normally consolidated, stiff, soft, contractive, dilative, etc.
3. structure: Refers to the arrangement of particles within the soil mass; the manner in which the particles are packed or distributed. Features such as layers, joints, fissures, slickensides, voids, pockets, cementation, etc., are part of the structure. Structure of soils is described by terms such as: undisturbed, disturbed, remolded, compacted, cemented; flocculent, honey-combed, single-grained; flocculated, deflocculated; stratified, layered, laminated; isotropic and anisotropic.
4. loading conditions: Effective stress path - drained, undrained, and type of loading - magnitude, rate (static, dynamic), and time history (monotonic, cyclic).

== Applications ==
=== Lateral earth pressure ===
Lateral earth stress theory is used to estimate the amount of stress soil can exert perpendicular to gravity. This is the stress exerted on retaining walls. A lateral earth stress coefficient, K, is defined as the ratio of lateral (horizontal) effective stress to vertical effective stress for cohesionless soils (K=σ'_{h}/σ'_{v}). There are three coefficients: at-rest, active, and passive. At-rest stress is the lateral stress in the ground before any disturbance takes place. The active stress state is reached when a wall moves away from the soil under the influence of lateral stress, and results from shear failure due to reduction of lateral stress. The passive stress state is reached when a wall is pushed into the soil far enough to cause shear failure within the mass due to increase of lateral stress. There are many theories for estimating lateral earth stress; some are empirically based, and some are analytically derived.

=== Bearing capacity ===
The bearing capacity of soil is the average contact stress between a foundation and the soil which will cause shear failure in the soil. Allowable bearing stress is the bearing capacity divided by a factor of safety. Sometimes, on soft soil sites, large settlements may occur under loaded foundations without actual shear failure occurring; in such cases, the allowable bearing stress is determined with regard to the maximum allowable settlement. It is important during construction and design stage of a project to evaluate the subgrade strength. The California Bearing Ratio (CBR) test is commonly used to determine the suitability of a soil as a subgrade for design and construction. The field Plate Load Test is commonly used to predict the deformations and failure characteristics of the soil/subgrade and modulus of subgrade reaction (ks). The modulus of subgrade reaction (ks) is used in foundation design, soil-structure interaction studies and design of highway pavements.

Field-based methods are commonly used to assess soil stiffness and bearing capacity under in-situ conditions. In addition to traditional approaches, lightweight deflectometer (LWD) testing has gained attention as a rapid and portable method for evaluating near-surface soil behaviour. LWD measurements can be used to estimate stiffness parameters and have shown strong correlation with fundamental engineering properties such as resilient modulus and deformation characteristics.

Further developments have demonstrated that LWD data can be integrated into mechanistic-empirical analysis and numerical modelling to improve predictions of pavement response and soil behaviour under loading.

Recent analytical work has also extended classical stress distribution approaches to better represent soil response under dynamic LWD loading, providing improved interpretation of in-situ measurements.

=== Slope stability ===
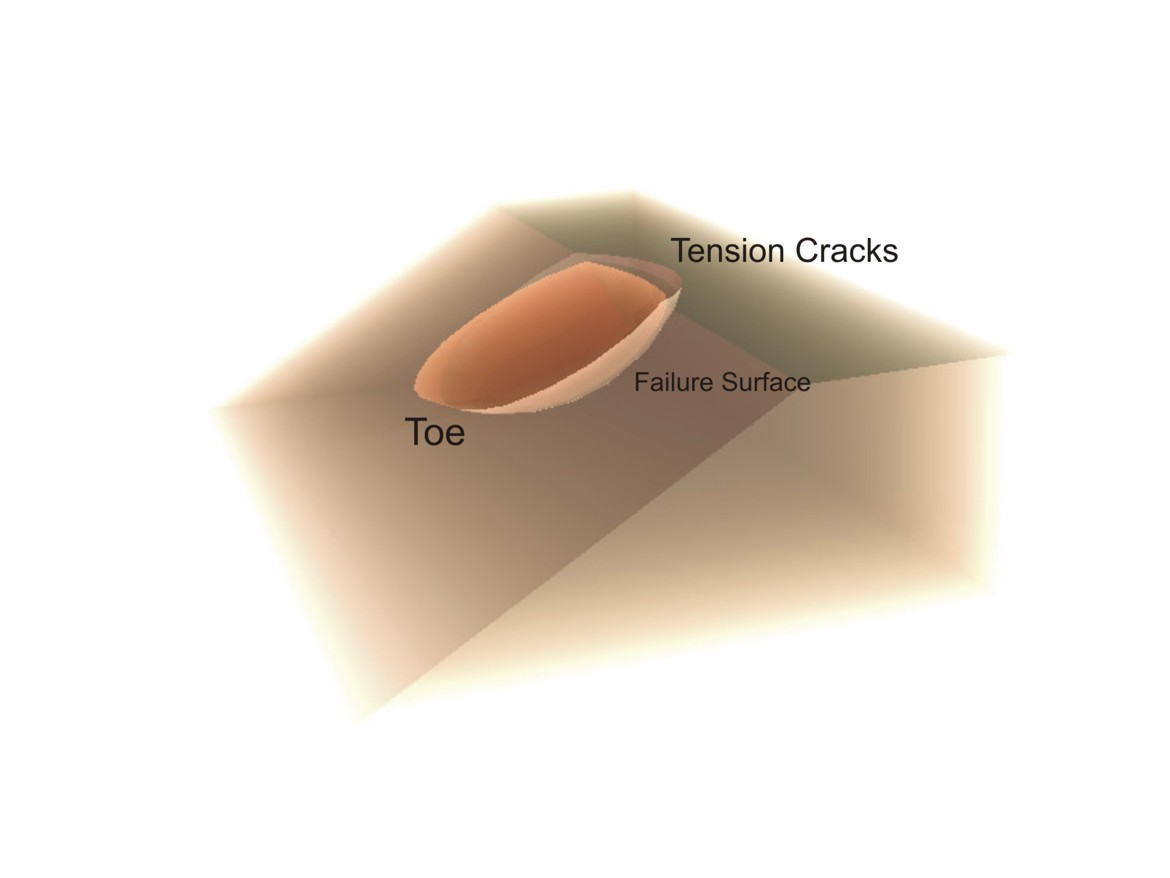
Simple slope slip section

The field of slope stability encompasses the analysis of static and dynamic stability of slopes of earth and rock-fill dams, slopes of other types of embankments, excavated slopes, and natural slopes in soil and soft rock.

As seen to the right, earthen slopes can develop a cut-spherical weakness zone. The probability of this happening can be calculated in advance using a simple 2-D circular analysis package. A primary difficulty with analysis is locating the most-probable slip plane for any given situation. Many landslides have been analyzed only after the fact. Landslides vs. rock strength are two factors for consideration.

== Recent developments ==
A recent finding in soil mechanics is that soil deformation can be described as the behavior of a dynamical system. This approach to soil mechanics is referred to as Dynamical Systems-Based Soil Mechanics (DSSM). DSSM holds simply that soil deformation is a Poisson process in which particles move to their final position at random shear strains.

The basis of DSSM is that soils (including sands) can be sheared till they reach a steady-state condition at which, under conditions of constant strain-rate, there is no change in shear stress, effective confining stress, and void ratio. The steady-state was formally defined by Steve J. Poulos, an associate professor at the Soil Mechanics Department of Harvard University, who built off a hypothesis that Arthur Casagrande was formulating towards the end of his career. The steady state condition is not the same as the "critical state" condition. It differs from the critical state in that it specifies a statistically constant structure at the steady state. The steady-state values are also very slightly dependent on the strain-rate.

Many systems in nature reach steady states, and dynamical systems theory describes such systems. Soil shear can also be described as a dynamical system. The physical basis of the soil shear dynamical system is a Poisson process in which particles move to the steady-state at random shear strains. Joseph generalized this: particles move to their final position (not just steady-state) at random shear-strains. Because of its origins in the steady state concept, DSSM is sometimes informally called "Harvard soil mechanics."

DSSM provides for very close fits to stress–strain curves, including for sands. Because it tracks conditions on the failure plane, it also provides close fits for the post failure region of sensitive clays and silts, something that other theories are not able to do. Additionally DSSM explains key relationships in soil mechanics that to date have simply been taken for granted, for example, why normalized undrained peak shear strengths vary with the log of the overconsolidation ratio and why stress–strain curves normalize with the initial effective confining stress; and why in one-dimensional consolidation the void ratio must vary with the log of the effective vertical stress, why the end-of-primary curve is unique for static load increments, and why the ratio of the creep value Cα to the compression index Cc must be approximately constant for a wide range of soils.

== In-situ testing ==
Among modern in-situ testing techniques, the lightweight deflectometer (LWD) provides a rapid method for estimating soil stiffness and deformation characteristics. Its portability and efficiency make it particularly suitable for field evaluation of subgrades and unbound materials in road engineering applications.

== See also ==
- Critical state soil mechanics
- Earthquake engineering
- Engineering geology
- Geotechnical centrifuge modeling
- Geotechnical engineering
- Geotechnical engineering (Offshore)
- Geotechnics
- Hydrogeology, aquifer characteristics closely related to soil characteristics
- International Society for Soil Mechanics and Geotechnical Engineering
- Rock mechanics
- Slope stability analysis
