= Atterberg =

Atterberg may refer to:

- Albert Atterberg (1846–1916), Swedish chemist and agricultural scientist
- Kurt Atterberg (1887–1974), Swedish composer and engineer
- Atterberg limits
