= Fall cone test =

The Fall cone test, also called the cone penetrometer test or the Vasiljev cone test, is an alternative method to the Casagrande method for measuring the Liquid Limit of a soil sample proposed in 1942 by the Russian researcher Piotr Vasiljev (Russian: Пё́тр Васи́льев) and first mentioned in the Russian standard GOST 5184 from 1949. It is often preferred to the Casagrande method because it is more repeatable and less variable with different operators. Other advantages of the fall cone test include the alternative to estimate the undrained shear strength of a soil based on the fall cone factor K.

In the Fall cone test, a stainless steel cone of a standardized weight and tip angle is positioned so that its tip just touches a soil sample. The cone is released for a determined period of time, usually 5s, so that it may penetrate the soil. Several standards around the globe exist. Main differences are related to the cone tip angle and cone mass. The liquid limit is defined as the water content of the soil which allows the cone to penetrate a determined depth during that period of time. The penetration depth at which the liquid limit is measured depends on the standard and method adopted. For example, one of the most recognized standards is the BS 1377. The British standard defines the liquid limit as the water content of a soil at which a 80g, 30º cone penetrates 20mm. Because it is difficult to obtain a test with exactly 20 mm penetration, the procedure is performed multiple times for a range of water contents and the results are interpolated. Furthermore, the undrained shear strength for each one of those measured water content can be computed as proposed by Hansbo:

$c_u=\frac{KQ}{h^2}$

where,

c_{u} = Undrained shear strength;

K = Fall cone factor;

Q = Cone weight;

h = Penetration depth.

The fall cone factor can vary between 0.5 and 1.33. It can be estimated as proposed by Llano-Serna and Contreras:

$K=0.37+0.1\ln{\omega}$

where,

$\omega$ = Equivalent rate of rotation when measuring the undrained shear strength using the mini shear vane test.

A summary of different existing standards is shown in the table below:

Country	Russia	UK	France	India	Australia	New Zealand	China	ISO	Sweden	Norway	Canada	Japan
Standard	GOST 5184-49	BS 1377	NF P 94-052-1	IS 2720	AS 1289	NZS 4402	SD128-007-84	ISO/TS 17892-12	SS 027120	NS 8002	CAN/BNQ 2501-092-M-86	JGS 0142
Cone angle (°)	30	30	30	30.5	30	30	30	30, 60	60	60	60	60
Cone mass (g)	76	80	80	80	80	80	76	80, 60	60	60	60	60
Relationship used during interpretation	h-w	h-w	h-w	h-w	h-w	h-w	log h - log w	h - w, log h - w	log h - w	log h - w	h - w	h -w
Cone penetration depth at liquid limit (mm)	10	20	17	20	20	20	17	20, 10	10	10	10	11.5
