= Permeability of soils =

Ability of soils to allow water to flow through its voids

A number of factors affect the permeability of soils, from particle size, impurities in the water, void ratio, the degree of saturation, and adsorbed water, to entrapped air and organic material.

== Background ==
Soil aeration maintains oxygen levels in the plants' root zone, needed for microbial and root respiration, and important to plant growth. Additionally, oxygen levels regulate soil temperatures and play a role in some chemical processes that support the oxidation of elements like Mn^{2+} and Fe^{2+} that can be toxic.

== Determination of the permeability coefficient ==
1. Laboratory experiments:
  1. Constant Head Permeability Test,
  2. Low-level permeability test,
  3. Horizontal permeability test.
1. Field experiments:
  1. Free aquifer,
  2. Pressured aquifer.

== Composition ==
There is great variability in the composition of soil air as plants consume gases and microbial processes release others. Soil air is relatively moist compared with atmospheric air, and CO_{2} concentrations tend to be higher, while O_{2} is usually quite a bit lower. O_{2} levels are higher in well-aerated soils, which also have higher levels of CH_{4} and N_{2}O than atmospheric air.

== Particle size ==
It was studied by Allen Hazen that the coefficient of permeability (k) of a soil is directly proportional to the square of the particle size (D). Thus permeability of coarse grained soil is very large as compared to that of fine grained soil. The permeability of coarse sand may be more than one million times as much that of clay.

== Impurities in soil ==
The presence of fine particulate impurities in a soil can decrease its permeability by progressive clogging of its porosity.

== Void ratio (e) ==
The coefficient of permeability varies with the void ratio as e/sup>/(1+e). For a given soil, the greater the void ratio, the higher the value of the coefficient of permeability. Here 'e' is the void ratio.

Based on other concepts it has been established that the permeability of a soil varies as e^{2} or e^{3}/(1+e). Whatever may be the exact relationship, all soils have e versus log k plot as a straight line.

== Degree of saturation ==
If the soil is not fully saturated, it contains air pockets. The permeability is reduced due to the presence of air which causes a blockage to the passage of water. Consequently, the permeability of a partially saturated soil is considerably smaller than that of fully saturated soil. In fact, Darcy's law is not strictly applicable to such soils.

== Absorbed water ==
Fine grained soils have a layer of adsorbed water strongly attached to their surface. This adsorbed layer is not free to move under gravity. It causes an obstruction to the flow of water in the pores and hence reduces the permeability of soils. According to Casagrande, it may be taken as the void ratio occupied by absorbed water and the permeability may be roughly assumed to be proportional to the square of the net voids ratio of (e - 0.1)

== Entrapped air and organic matter ==
Air entrapped in the soil and organic matter block the passage of water through soil, hence permeability considerably decreases. In permeability tests, the sample of soil used should be fully saturated to avoid errors.

== See also ==
- Darcy's law
- Hydraulic conductivity
- Permeability (Earth sciences)
- Soil
- Soil mechanics
