= Martinus Theodorus van Genuchten =

Dutch soil physicist and hydrologist

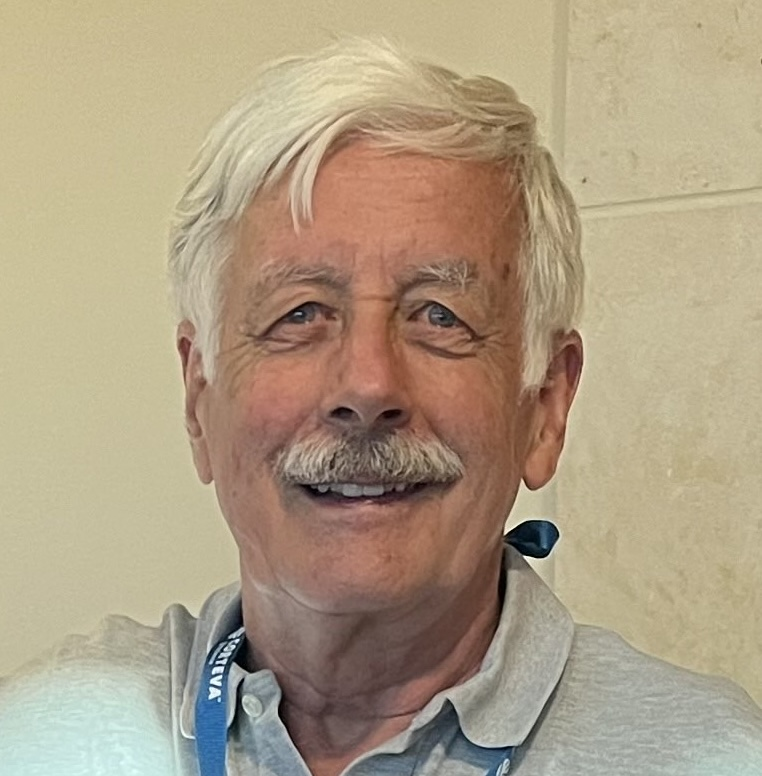
- Van Genuchten
- Born: 13 February 1945 (age 81); Vught, Netherlands
- Education: Wageningen University & Research (BS, MS); New Mexico State University (PhD)
- Known for: Van Genuchten model Mualem–van Genuchten model HYDRUS; Modeling of unsaturated flow and solute transport
- Awards: Wolf Prize in Agriculture (2023); Robert E. Horton Medal (2020); Prince Sultan Bin Abdulaziz International Prize for Water (2018); John Dalton Medal (2010)
- Scientific career
- Fields: Soil physics Hydrology; Vadose-zone hydrology Porous media
- Workplaces: Federal University of Rio de Janeiro; Utrecht University; U.S. Salinity Laboratory; University of California, Riverside; Princeton University
- Thesis: Mass Transfer Studies in Sorbing Porous Media (1975)
- Doctoral advisor: Peter J. Wierenga

Martinus Theodorus "Rien" van Genuchten (born 13 February 1945) is a Dutch-Brazilian soil physicist and hydrologist known for his research on water flow and solute transport in unsaturated porous media. His work has contributed to soil science, vadose zone hydrology, groundwater hydrology, contaminant transport and the numerical modeling of subsurface processes.

Van Genuchten is particularly associated with the soil hydraulic model introduced in his 1980 paper A Closed-form Equation for Predicting the Hydraulic Conductivity of Unsaturated Soils. The formulation, especially when combined with the pore-size distribution theory of Yechezkel Mualem, became widely known as the Mualem–van Genuchten model and is extensively used to describe soil-water retention and unsaturated hydraulic conductivity.

He has also contributed to analytical and numerical software for modeling water and contaminant transport, including RETC, CXTFIT, STANMOD and the HYDRUS family of programs. In 2023 he received the Wolf Prize in Agriculture for his research on water flow and contaminant transport in soils.

== Early life and education ==
Van Genuchten was born on 13 February 1945 in Vught, in the southern Netherlands. He grew up on a small family farm and was the third of eleven children.

Although his formal name is Martinus Theodorus van Genuchten, he has generally been known as Rien van Genuchten. In a 2024 autobiographical article, he explained that he was called "Rini" as a child before the name gradually became "Rien".

He entered the Agricultural College at Wageningen, now Wageningen University & Research, in 1962. He received his bachelor's degree in 1968 and completed graduate studies in irrigation and drainage, receiving his master's degree in 1971.

During his studies at Wageningen he spent about a year in Madagascar, where he worked on rice irrigation and hydrological measurements. His early research also included drip irrigation and analytical descriptions of water distribution in soils.

Van Genuchten subsequently moved to the United States and entered the doctoral program at New Mexico State University, working under soil physicist Peter J. Wierenga. His research there focused on water and contaminant movement through soils, including physical and chemical nonequilibrium processes.

His doctoral thesis, Mass Transfer Studies in Sorbing Porous Media, dealt with solute and contaminant transport, including pesticide movement and dual-porosity descriptions of nonequilibrium transport. He received his PhD in soil physics in 1975.

== Career ==
=== Early career in the United States ===
Near the completion of his doctorate, van Genuchten joined the Department of Civil Engineering at Princeton University, where he worked from 1975 to 1978. His research there included numerical solutions for water flow and contaminant transport in variably saturated porous media.

At Princeton he worked with researchers including George F. Pinder and William G. Gray. Among the problems he investigated was how to represent unsaturated soil hydraulic properties using continuous analytical functions rather than interpolated experimental data.

In 1978 van Genuchten moved to Riverside, California. He subsequently spent about three decades associated with the U.S. Salinity Laboratory of the Agricultural Research Service of the United States Department of Agriculture, while also having an academic association with the University of California, Riverside.

His research in Riverside included unsaturated water flow, salinity, contaminant transport, soil hydraulic properties, inverse parameter estimation and mathematical modeling. He later served as a supervisory soil scientist and research leader at the Salinity Laboratory.

The Riverside period produced much of van Genuchten's best-known theoretical and computational work, including his soil hydraulic equations, studies of nonequilibrium transport and collaborations leading to a series of analytical and numerical computer programs.

=== International appointments and later career ===
Van Genuchten's career also involved research appointments and collaborations outside the United States. He spent sabbatical periods in Avignon, France, in 1985–1986 and in Zurich, Switzerland, in 1995–1996, as well as shorter periods working with researchers in other countries.

He left the U.S. Salinity Laboratory in 2008 and subsequently developed long-term affiliations with the Federal University of Rio de Janeiro (UFRJ) in Brazil and Utrecht University in the Netherlands.

At UFRJ, van Genuchten began collaborating with COPPE in 2008, initially through the Mechanical Engineering Program. In 2017 he became associated with the Nuclear Engineering Program, working on applications of porous-media hydrology to environmental and engineering problems.

His research collaborations at UFRJ have included studies of radioactive materials, contaminant transport, waste disposal and flow through carbonate rocks.

Van Genuchten also became affiliated with the Department of Earth Sciences at Utrecht University. His work there has included collaborations in hydrogeology, pore-scale processes, fluid flow and solute transport. Utrecht University lists him as a visiting researcher in its Environmental Hydrogeology group.

At the time he received the 2023 Wolf Prize in Agriculture, van Genuchten was serving as a professor in UFRJ's Department of Nuclear Engineering. FAPERJ identified him in February 2023 as a professor of that department, while the Wolf Foundation formally listed "The Federal University of Rio de Janeiro, Brazil" as his "affiliation at the time of the award".

His later publications have continued to list affiliations with both UFRJ's Department of Nuclear Engineering and Utrecht University's Department of Earth Sciences.

== Research ==
=== Vadose-zone hydrology ===
A major focus of van Genuchten's research has been the vadose zone, the part of the subsurface between the land surface and the groundwater table in which soil and rock pores contain both air and water.

Understanding water and chemical movement through this region is important to agriculture, groundwater recharge, contaminant migration, irrigation, flood processes and water quality. Van Genuchten developed analytical and numerical methods for describing these processes in variably saturated soils and rocks.

His research has included equilibrium and nonequilibrium solute transport, preferential flow, contaminant sorption, soil-water retention, unsaturated hydraulic conductivity, parameter estimation, salinity, root-water uptake and transport through structured soils and fractured materials.

=== Van Genuchten model ===
Van Genuchten's most widely used theoretical contribution is the soil hydraulic formulation published in his 1980 paper A Closed-form Equation for Predicting the Hydraulic Conductivity of Unsaturated Soils.

Effective saturation, $S_e$, can be defined as

$$S_e = \frac{\theta-\theta_r}{\theta_s-\theta_r},$$

where $\theta$ is volumetric water content, $\theta_r$ is residual water content and $\theta_s$ is saturated water content.

A commonly used form of the van Genuchten soil-water retention function is

$$S_e(h)=\left[1+(\alpha |h|)^n\right]^{-m},$$

where $h$ is pressure head and $\alpha$, $n$ and $m$ determine the shape of the retention curve. In the formulation commonly combined with Mualem's conductivity model,

$$m=1-\frac{1}{n}.$$

The corresponding unsaturated hydraulic conductivity can be expressed as

$$K(S_e)=K_s S_e^\ell
\left[1-\left(1-S_e^{1/m}\right)^m\right]^2,$$

where $K_s$ is saturated hydraulic conductivity and $\ell$ is a pore-connectivity parameter.

The combination became known as the Mualem–van Genuchten model. Its relatively simple mathematical form made it suitable for incorporation into numerical solutions of the nonlinear equations governing unsaturated flow.

The European Geosciences Union cited the widespread use of van Genuchten's parametric soil hydraulic models when awarding him the John Dalton Medal in 2010.

=== Nonequilibrium and preferential transport ===
Another major component of van Genuchten's work concerns situations in which water and dissolved substances do not move uniformly through porous materials.

His doctoral research included models describing physical and chemical nonequilibrium in soil columns. These included representations of porous media as containing mobile and relatively immobile water regions.

Van Genuchten subsequently helped develop and apply dual-porosity and dual-permeability approaches to water and solute transport. Such models are used to represent preferential flow and exchange between different pore regions in aggregated soils, macroporous media and fractured rocks.

The Wolf Foundation highlighted his work on dual-porosity and dual-permeability models as one of his principal contributions to soil physics and vadose-zone hydrology.

=== Inverse modeling ===
Van Genuchten was also among the researchers who introduced inverse parameter-estimation approaches into soil hydrology.

Inverse modeling determines hydraulic or transport parameters by adjusting a mathematical model until its calculated results reproduce laboratory or field measurements. Van Genuchten and collaborators applied these methods to water-flow and solute-transport problems beginning in the 1980s.

His later work incorporated parameter-estimation procedures into numerical flow and transport models. These methods became important in the interpretation of experimental measurements and in estimating soil hydraulic and solute-transport properties.

=== HYDRUS and other computer models ===
Van Genuchten contributed to the development and application of several generations of analytical and numerical software for water flow and solute transport.

Among the programs associated with his work were RETC, used for describing soil hydraulic properties, and CXTFIT, used in the analysis of solute-transport experiments. Analytical transport models were later incorporated into STANMOD.

Van Genuchten also collaborated extensively with Jiří Šimůnek, Miroslav Šejna and other researchers on the development and application of the HYDRUS family of numerical models.

HYDRUS is used to simulate water flow, heat transport and solute movement in variably saturated porous media. Its development involved several generations of programs and multiple research groups rather than a single software package developed by one individual.

The Prince Sultan Bin Abdulaziz International Prize for Water cited RETC, CXTFIT, STANMOD and especially HYDRUS among the theoretical and software tools associated with van Genuchten's contributions to hydrogeology when it awarded him its Groundwater Prize in 2018.

Later versions of HYDRUS have incorporated processes including root-water uptake, chemical reactions, nonequilibrium transport and multicomponent solute systems.

== Applications ==
Van Genuchten's theoretical and computational work has been applied to agricultural, hydrological and environmental problems involving irrigation, salinity, groundwater recharge and pollutant transport.

His research has addressed the movement of pesticides, nutrients, pharmaceuticals, pathogens, colloids and other contaminants through soils and groundwater systems. He has also worked on multicomponent geochemical transport and radionuclide migration.

During his later work at UFRJ, van Genuchten participated in studies involving naturally occurring radioactive materials, uranium-related wastes and environmental problems associated with radioactive materials.

One project examined the radioactive-waste repository constructed after the 1987 Goiânia caesium-137 accident. Van Genuchten and collaborators used HYDRUS-1D to investigate water flow and possible radionuclide transport from the repository.

His later collaborations have also included studies of the hydraulic behavior of carbonate rocks using techniques such as nuclear magnetic resonance, micro-computed tomography and pore-network modeling.

== Scientific publishing and professional service ==
Van Genuchten was the founding editor of the Vadose Zone Journal, serving as its founding editor from 2001 to 2005.

The journal was established as an interdisciplinary publication for research on the unsaturated near-surface environment, including water flow, contaminant transport, fractured media and related soil, geological and environmental processes.

Van Genuchten also served in editorial roles for other scientific journals, including Water Resources Research, Journal of Contaminant Hydrology, Advances in Water Resources and Soil Science.

He has participated in international scientific committees and has given lectures, workshops and short courses in numerous countries. He also taught courses on numerical modeling and HYDRUS applications with collaborators including Jiří Šimůnek.

== Awards and honors ==
Van Genuchten has received awards from organizations in soil science, hydrology and porous-media research.

- 1996 – Soil Science Research Award, Soil Science Society of America.
- 1998 – Don and Betty Kirkham Soil Physics Award, Soil Science Society of America.
- 2003 – elected Fellow of the American Association for the Advancement of Science.
- 2004 – honorary doctorate from the University of Hannover, Germany.
- 2005 – Dionýz Štúr Medal of Honor for Outstanding Achievements in the Natural Sciences, Slovak Academy of Sciences.
- 2010 – John Dalton Medal of the European Geosciences Union, for contributions to the understanding of flow and transport in the unsaturated zone.
- 2012 – Honorary Membership Award of the International Society for Porous Media (InterPore).
- 2016 – Don and Betty Kirkham Gold Medal.
- 2018 – Groundwater Prize of the 8th Prince Sultan Bin Abdulaziz International Prize for Water. The award recognized his development and application of theoretical and computational tools for describing water flow and contaminant transport in soil and groundwater systems. The award ceremony was held in New York on 29 October 2018.
- 2020 – Robert E. Horton Medal of the American Geophysical Union.
- 2023 – Wolf Prize in Agriculture, awarded "for his groundbreaking work in understanding water flow and predicting contaminant transport in soils".

At the time of the 2023 Wolf Prize, van Genuchten was a professor in the Department of Nuclear Engineering at the Federal University of Rio de Janeiro; FAPERJ identified him in that position, and the Wolf Foundation listed The Federal University of Rio de Janeiro, Brazil as his affiliation at the time of the award.

He has also been elected a Fellow of the American Geophysical Union, the American Society of Agronomy and the Soil Science Society of America.

== Selected publications ==
Van Genuchten has authored or co-authored hundreds of scientific publications on soil hydraulic properties, water flow, solute transport, contaminant hydrology and numerical modeling.

Selected publications include:

- van Genuchten, M. Th.; Davidson, J. M.; Wierenga, P. J. (1974). "An Evaluation of Kinetic and Equilibrium Equations for the Prediction of Pesticide Movement Through Porous Media". Soil Science Society of America Journal. 38: 29–35.
- van Genuchten, M. Th.; Wierenga, P. J. (1976). "Mass transfer studies in sorbing porous media: I. Analytical solutions". Soil Science Society of America Journal. 40 (4): 473–480.
- van Genuchten, M. Th.; Wierenga, P. J. (1977). "Mass transfer studies in sorbing porous media: II. Experimental evaluation with tritium". Soil Science Society of America Journal. 41 (2): 272–278.
- van Genuchten, M. Th. (1980). "A Closed-form Equation for Predicting the Hydraulic Conductivity of Unsaturated Soils". Soil Science Society of America Journal. 44 (5): 892–898. doi:10.2136/sssaj1980.03615995004400050002x.
- van Genuchten, M. Th.; Tang, D. H.; Guennelon, R. (1984). "Some exact solutions for solute transport through soils containing large cylindrical macropores". Water Resources Research. 20 (3): 335–346. doi:10.1029/WR020i003p00335.
- Šimůnek, J.; van Genuchten, M. Th.; Šejna, M. (2008). "Development and Applications of the HYDRUS and STANMOD Software Packages and Related Codes". Vadose Zone Journal. 7 (2): 587–600. doi:10.2136/vzj2007.0077.
- Šimůnek, J.; van Genuchten, M. Th.; Šejna, M. (2016). "Recent Developments and Applications of the HYDRUS Computer Software Packages". Vadose Zone Journal. 15 (7). doi:10.2136/vzj2016.04.0033.
- Šimůnek, J.; Brunetti, G.; Jacques, D.; van Genuchten, M. Th.; Šejna, M. (2024). "Developments and applications of the HYDRUS computer software packages since 2016". Vadose Zone Journal. 23 (4): e20310. doi:10.1002/vzj2.20310.
- van Genuchten, M. Th. (2024). "Rien van Genuchten: A short autobiography". Vadose Zone Journal. 23 (4): e20322. doi:10.1002/vzj2.20322.

== See also ==
- Soil physics
- Vadose zone
- Hydraulic conductivity
- Water retention curve
- Richards equation
- Porous medium
- HYDRUS (software)
- Groundwater pollution
- Solute transport
