= Atterberg limits =

Geotechnical characteristics of a soil related to its water content

The Atterberg limits are a basic measure of the critical water contents of a fine-grained soil: its shrinkage limit, plastic limit, and liquid limit.

Depending on its water content, soil may appear in one of four states: solid, semi-solid, plastic and liquid. In each state, the consistency and behavior of soil are different, and consequently so are its engineering properties. Thus, the boundary between each state can be defined based on a change in the soil's behavior. The Atterberg limits can be used to distinguish between silt and clay and to distinguish between different types of silts and clays. The water content at which soil changes from one state to the other is known as consistency limits, or Atterberg's limit.

These limits were created by Albert Atterberg, a Swedish chemist and agronomist, in 1911. They were later refined by Arthur Casagrande, an Austrian geotechnical engineer and a close collaborator of Karl Terzaghi (both pioneers of soil mechanics).

Distinctions in soils are used in assessing soil which is to have a structure built on them. Soils when wet retain water, and some expand in volume (smectite clay). The amount of expansion is related to the ability of the soil to take in water and its structural make-up (the type of minerals present: clay, silt, or sand). These tests are mainly used on clayey or silty soils since these are the soils which expand and shrink when the moisture content varies. Clays and silts interact with water and thus change sizes and have varying shear strengths. Thus these tests are used widely in the preliminary stages of designing any structure to ensure that the soil will have the correct amount of shear strength and not too much change in volume as it expands and shrinks with different moisture contents.

== Laboratory tests ==
=== Shrinkage limit ===
The shrinkage limit (SL) is the water content where further loss of moisture will not result in a reduction in volume. The test to determine the shrinkage limit is ASTM International D4943. The shrinkage limit is much less commonly used than the liquid and plastic limits.

=== Plastic limit ===
The plastic limit (PL) is determined by rolling out a thread of the fine portion of a soil on a flat, non-porous surface. The procedure is defined in ASTM Standard D 4318. If the soil is at a moisture content where its behavior is plastic, this thread will retain its shape down to a very narrow diameter. The sample can then be remolded and the test repeated. As the moisture content falls due to evaporation, the thread will begin to break apart at larger diameters.

The plastic limit is defined as the gravimetric moisture content where the thread breaks apart at a diameter of 3.2 mm (about 1/8 inch). A soil is considered non-plastic if a thread cannot be rolled out down to 3.2 mm at any moisture possible.

=== Liquid limit ===
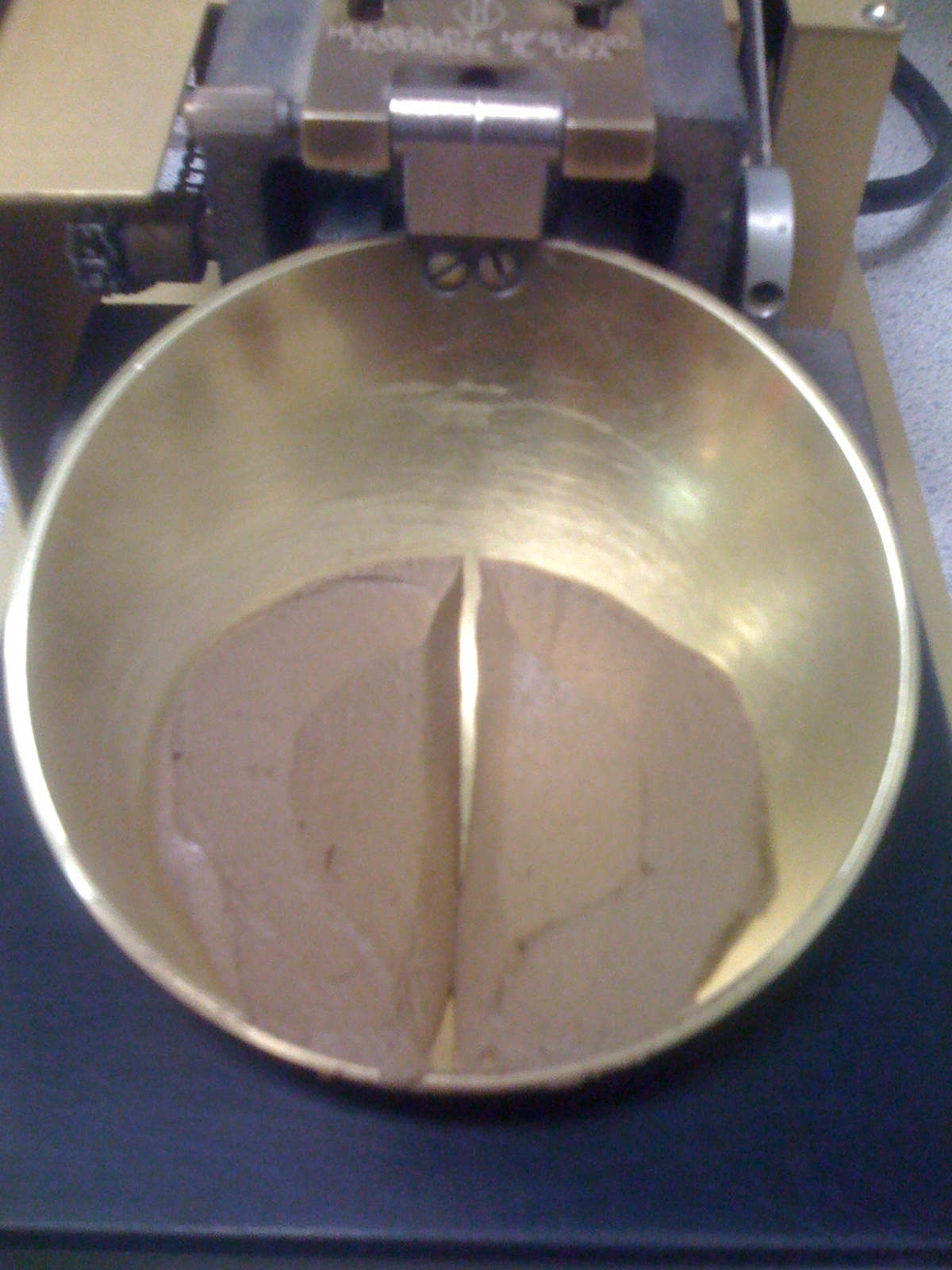
Casagrande cup in action

The liquid limit (LL) is conceptually defined as the water content at which the behavior of a clayey soil changes from the plastic state to the liquid state. However, the transition from plastic to liquid behavior is gradual over a range of water contents, and the shear strength of the soil is not actually zero at the liquid limit. The precise definition of the liquid limit is based on standard test procedures described below.

==== Casagrande's method ====
Atterberg's original liquid limit test involved mixing a pat of clay in a round-bottomed porcelain bowl of 10–12 cm diameter. A groove was cut through the pat of clay with a spatula, and the bowl was then struck many times against the palm of one hand. Casagrande subsequently standardized the apparatus (by incorporating a crank-rotated cam mechanism to standardize the dropping action) and the procedures to make the measurement more repeatable. Soil is placed into the metal cup (Casagrande cup) portion of the device and a groove is made down at its center with a standardized tool of 2 millimetres (0.079 in) width. The cup is repeatedly dropped 10 mm onto a hard rubber base at a rate of 120 blows per minute, during which the groove closes up gradually as a result of the impact. The number of blows for the groove to close is recorded. The moisture content at which it takes 25 drops of the cup to cause the groove to close over a distance of 12.7 millimetres (0.50 in) is defined as the liquid limit. The test is normally run at several moisture contents, and the moisture content which requires 25 blows to close the groove is interpolated from the test results. The liquid limit test is defined by ASTM standard test method D 4318. The test method also allows running the test at one moisture content where 20 to 30 blows are required to close the groove; then a correction factor is applied to obtain the liquid limit from the moisture content.

==== Fall cone test ====
Another method for measuring the liquid limit is the fall cone test, also called the cone penetrometer test. It is based on the measurement of penetration into the soil of a standardized stainless steel cone of specific apex angle, length and mass. Although the Casagrande test is widely used across North America, the fall cone test is much more prevalent in Europe and elsewhere due to being less dependent on the operator in determining the liquid limit.

Advantages over Casagrande Method

- It is easier to perform in laboratory.
- The results from the cone penetrometer do not depend on the skills or the judgement of the operator. So, the results obtained are more reliable.
- The results can be used to estimate the undrained shear strength of soils.

== Derived limits ==
The values of these limits are used in several ways. There is also a close relationship between the limits and properties of soil, such as compressibility, permeability, and strength. This is thought to be very useful because as limit determination is relatively simple, it is more difficult to determine these other properties. Thus, the Atterberg limits are used to identify the soil's classification and allow for empirical correlations for some other engineering properties.

=== Plasticity index ===
The plasticity index (PI) is a measure of the plasticity of soil. The plasticity index is the size of the range of water contents where the soil exhibits plastic properties. The PI is the difference between the liquid and plastic limits (PI = LL-PL).

Soil descriptions based on PI:

- (0) – Non-plastic
- (<7) – Slightly plastic
- (7-17) – Medium plastic
- (>17) – Highly plastic

=== Liquidity index ===
The liquidity index (LI) is used to scale the natural water content of a soil sample to the limit. It can be calculated as a ratio of the difference between natural water content, plastic limit, and liquid limit: LI=(W-PL)/(LL-PL), where W is the natural water content.

=== Consistency index ===
The consistency index (Ic) indicates a soil's consistency (firmness). It is calculated as CI = (LL-W)/(LL-PL), where W is the existing water content. The soil at the liquid limit will have a consistency index of 0, the soil at the plastic limit will have a consistency index of 1, and if W > LL, Ic is negative. That means the soil is in the liquid state. Moreover, the sum of the Liquidity index and Consistency index is equal to 1 (one)

=== Flow index ===
The curve obtained from the graph of water content against the log of blows while determining the liquid limit is almost straight and is known as the flow curve.

The equation for flow curve is: W = - I_{f} Log N + C

Where 'I_{f} is the slope of flow curve and is termed as "Flow Index"

=== Toughness index ===
The shearing strength of clay at the plastic limit is a measure of its toughness. It is the ratio of the plasticity index to the flow index. It gives us an idea of the shear strength of the soil.

=== Activity ===
The activity of soil is the ratio of the plasticity index to the clay size fraction. If activity is less than 0.75, the soil's clay is inactive. If activity exceeds 1.25, then the soil's clay is termed active. If activity lies within the above values, then the soil's clay is called normal.

Soil texture and Plasticity data
NO	Description	Sand	Silt	Clay	LL	PI
1	Well graded loamy sand	88	10	2	16	NP
2	Well graded sandy loam	72	15	13	16	NP
3	Med graded sandy loam	73	9	18	22	4
4	Lean sandy silty clay	32	33	35	28	9
5	Lean silty clay	5	64	31	36	15
6	Loessial silt	5	85	10	26	2
7	Heavy clay	6	22	72	67	40
8	Poorly graded sand	94	6	6	NP	NP

Atterberg Limit Values for the Clay Minerals
Mineral	LL, %	PL, %	SL, %
Montmorillonite	100-900	50-100	8.5-15
Nontronite	37-72	19-27	
Illite	60-120	35-60	15-17
Kaolinite	30-110	25-40	25-29
Hydrated halloysite	50-70	47-60	
Dehydrated halloysite	35-55	30-45	
Attapulgite	160-230	100-120	
Chlorite	44-47	36-40	
Allopphane (undried)	200-250	130-140	
