= Falling weight deflectometer =

Road testing device

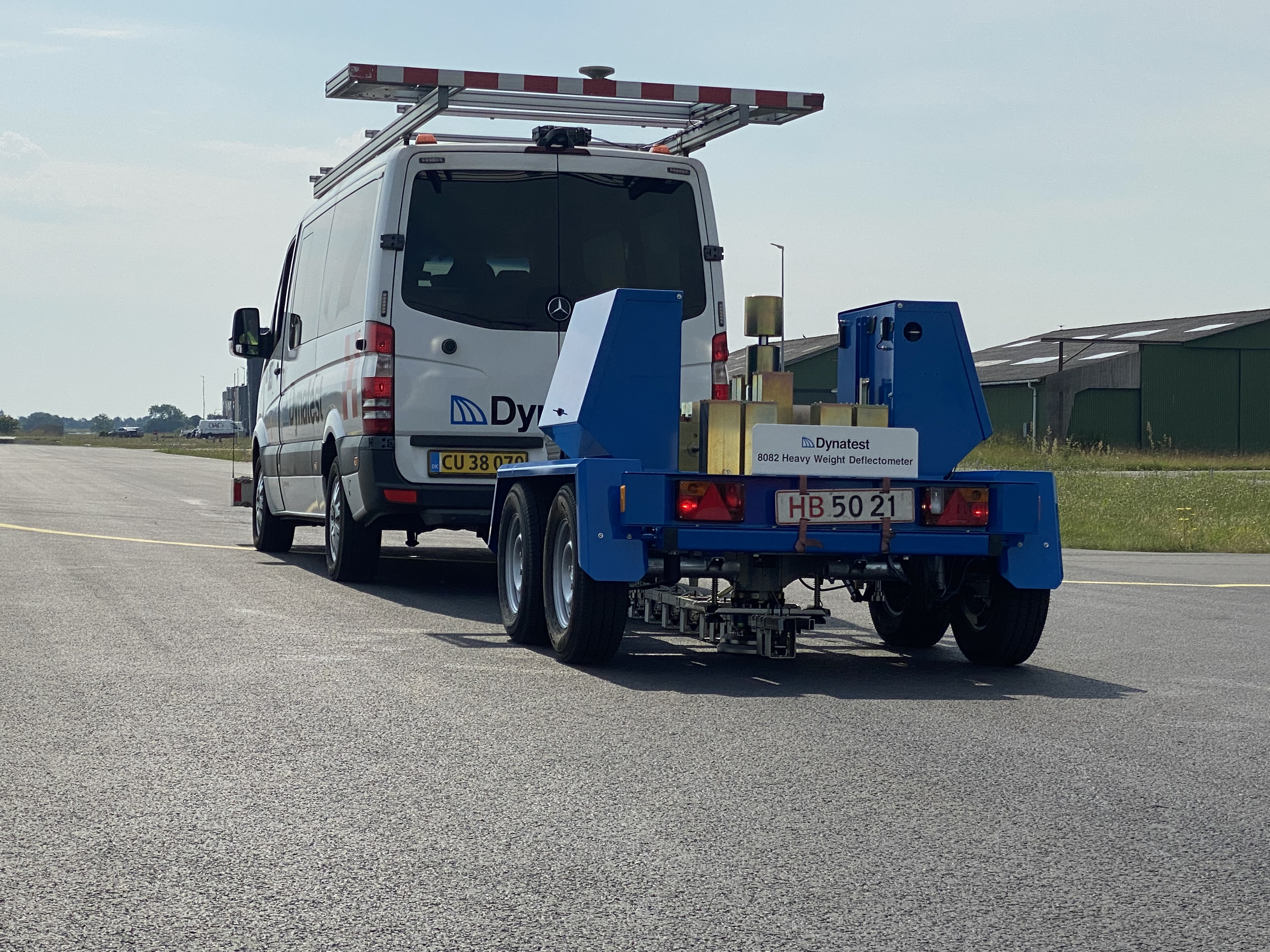
Heavy Weight Deflectometer

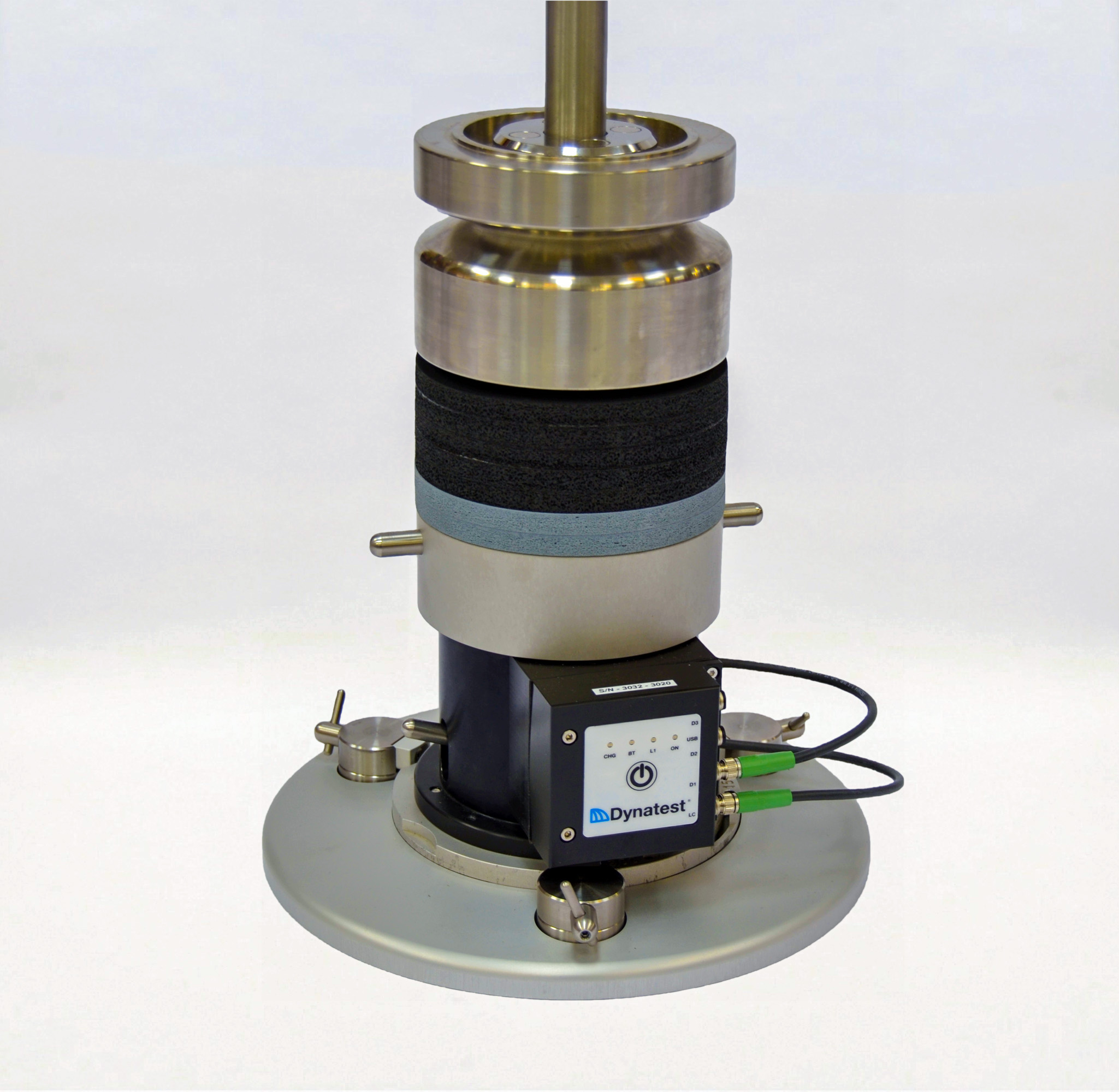
Light Weight Deflectometer

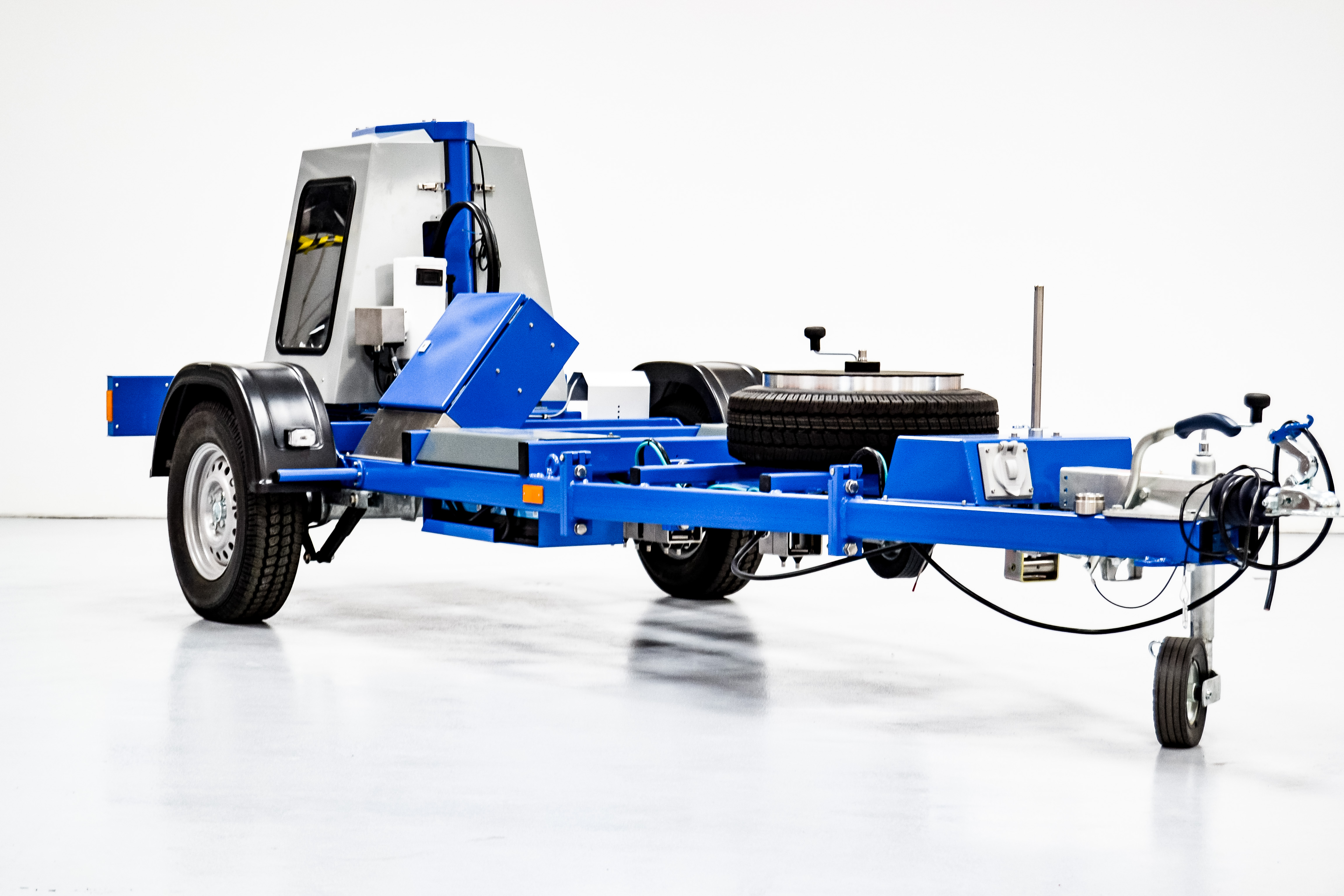
Falling Weight Deflectometer (FWD)

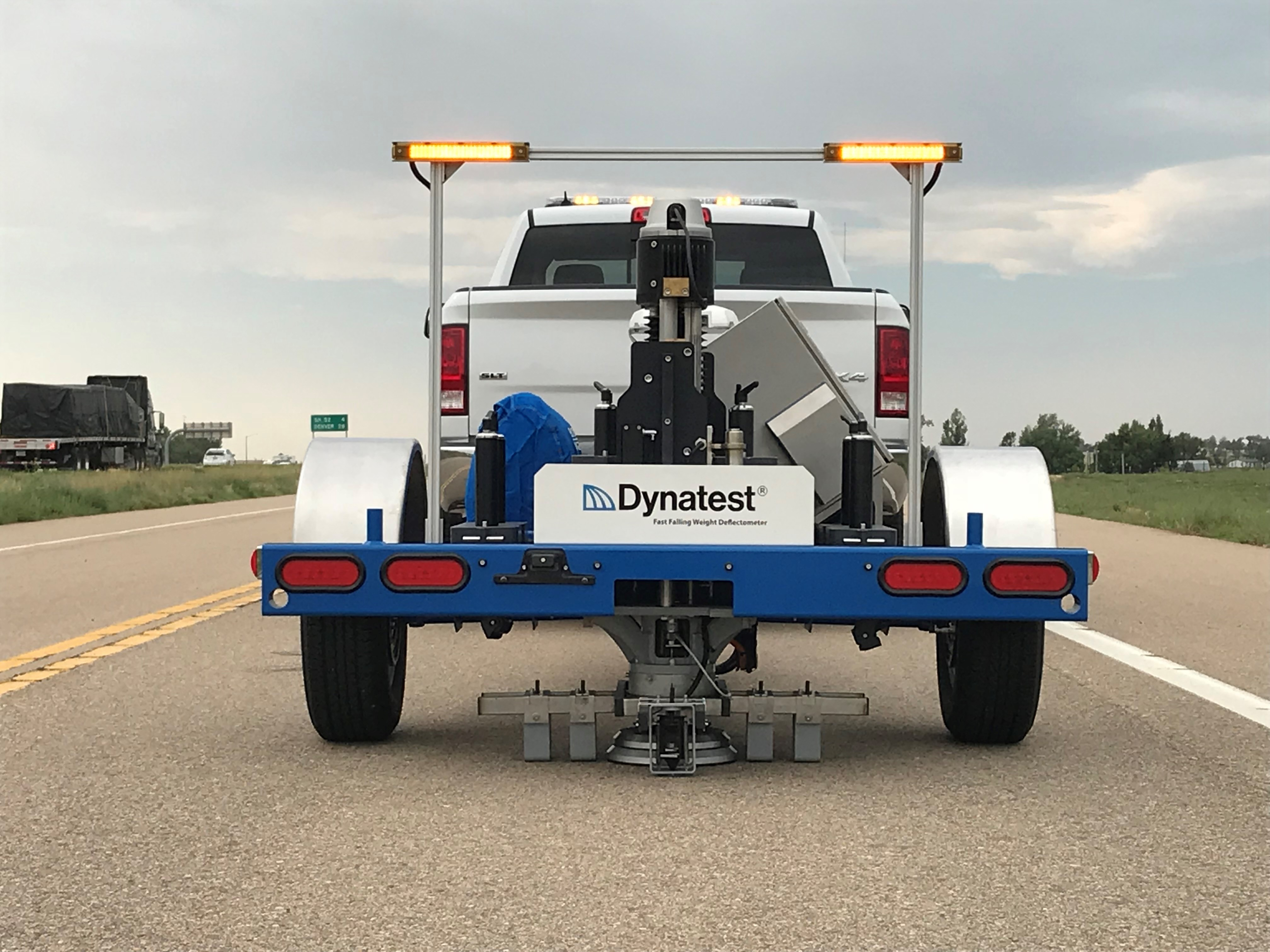
Fast Falling Deflectometer

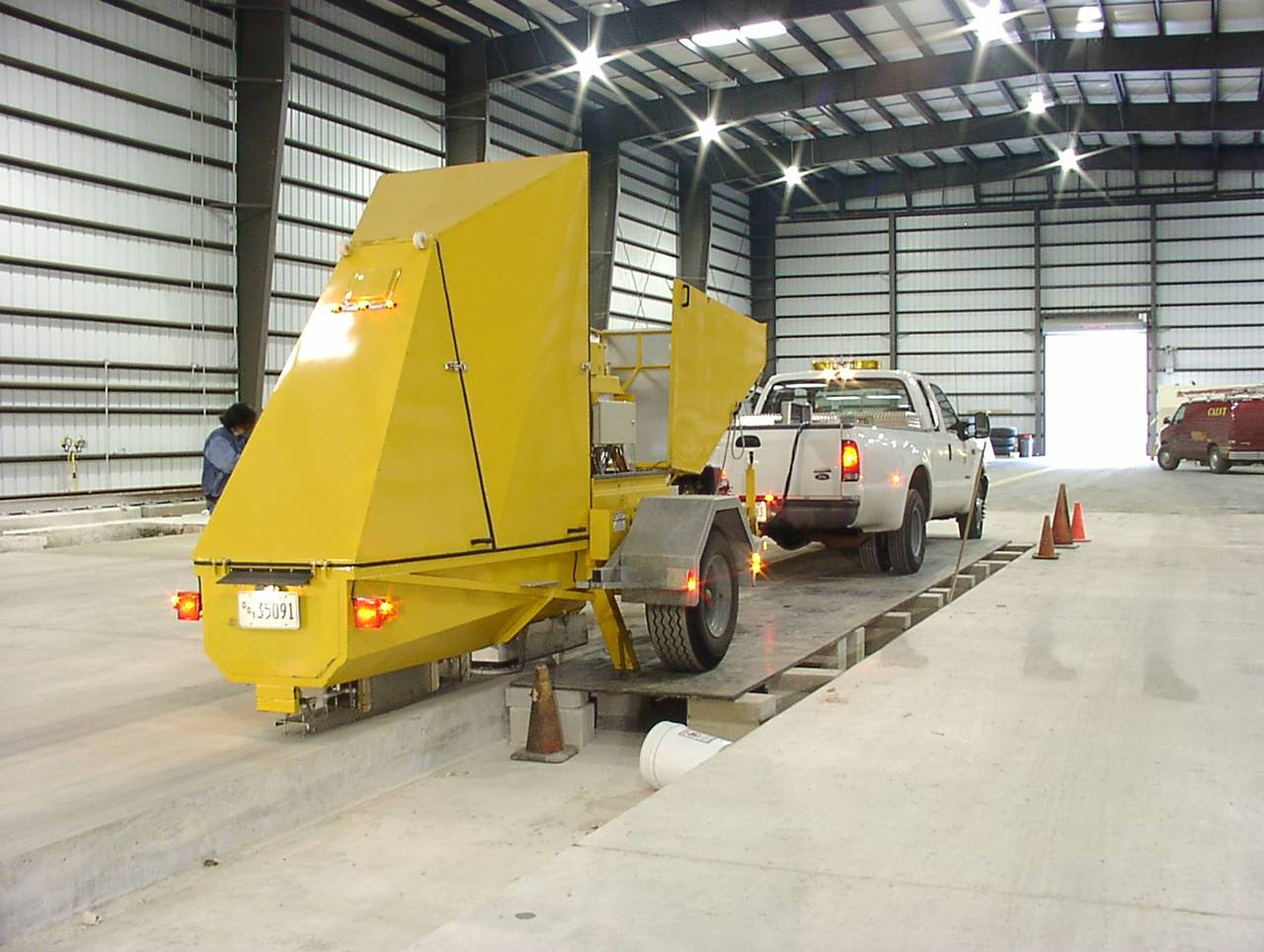
A falling weight deflectometer, towed by a truck

A falling weight deflectometer (FWD) is a testing device used by civil engineers to evaluate the physical properties of pavement in highways, local roads, airport pavements, harbor areas, railway tracks and elsewhere. The data acquired from FWDs is primarily used to estimate pavement structural capacity, to facilitate overlay design or determine if a pavement is being overloaded. Depending on its design, a FWD may be contained within a towable trailer or it may be built into a self-propelled vehicle such as a truck or van. Comprehensive road survey vehicles typically consist of a FWD mounted on a heavy truck together with a ground-penetrating radar and impact attenuator.

During testing, a FWD subjects the pavement surface to a load pulse which simulates the load produced by a rolling vehicle wheel. The load pulse is produced by dropping a large weight onto a "buffer" which shapes the pulse, and then transmitted to the pavement through a circular load plate. Data are acquired from various sensors for use in post-test analysis of pavement properties. Deflection sensors are used to measure the deformation of the pavement in response to the load pulse. In some FWDs the magnitude of the applied load pulse is an assumed constant value determined by system design; in others the force is measured by load cells.

The load plate may be solid or segmented. Segmented load plates adapt to the shape of the pavement to more evenly distribute the load on uneven surfaces. The load plate diameter is typically 300 mm diameter on roads and 450 mm on airports, and the load for road testing is about 40 kN, producing about 567 kPa pressure under the load plate (50 kN / 707 kPa according to European standard).

== Load impact system ==
There are two different types of load impact systems; single-mass and double-mass.

In a single-mass system, a weight is dropped onto a single buffer connected to a load plate, which in turn rests on the surface being tested. Single-mass FWDs are typically smaller, faster and less expensive but, when used on soft soils, may overestimate the capacity of pavements due to the mass inertia of the pavement material.

In a double-mass system, the weight drops onto an assembly consisting of a first buffer, a second weight, and a second buffer. (Note: In a double-mass system, the principle of operation is based on the law of conservation of momentum with an elastic collision of two unequal masses.) This produces a longer loading duration that more precisely simulates a wheel load, and yields higher reproducibility and gives a more accurate result on pavements built on soft soils. In some implementations the weights may be optionally locked together to act as a single-mass system.

In all systems, the load pulse shape and rise time is important because it can affect the peak values of center deflection by as much as 10% to 20%.

== Deflection sensors ==
Deflection sensors are used to measure the deformation of the pavement in response to the load pulse. The sensors are mounted radially from the center of the load plate at typical offsets of 0, 200, 300, 450, 600, 900, 1200 and 1500 mm (the deflections measured at these offsets are denoted D0, D200, D300, etc.).

Two types of deflection sensors are used: geophones and force-balance seismometers. Seismometers have built-in calibration devices and higher deflection measurement ranges (5 mm vs 2 mm). Geophones lack built-in calibration devices and are more sensitive to disturbances immediately before the impact since the initial error is integrated, but are much less expensive than seismometers.

== Analysis ==
FWD data is most often used to calculate stiffness-related parameters of a pavement structure. The process of calculating the elastic moduli of individual layers in a multi-layer system (e.g. asphalt concrete on top of a base course on top of the subgrade) based on surface deflections is known as "backcalculation", as there is no closed-form solution. Instead, initial moduli are assumed, surface deflections calculated, and then the moduli are adjusted in an iterative fashion to converge on the measured deflections. This process is computationally intensive although quick on modern computers. It can give quite misleading results and requires an experienced analyst. Commonly used backcalculation software are:

- BAKFAA (Federal Aviation Administration)
- Clevercalc (University of Washington)
- ELMOD (Dynatest)
- Evercalc (WSDOT)
- KGPBACK (Geotran)
- MichBack (Michigan DOT)
- Modulus (TxDOT)
- PVD (KUAB)
- PRIMAX DESIGN / RoSy Design (Sweco, former Carl Bro)

Many analysts use simplified methods to calculate related parameters that are empirical in nature. The most common is maximum deflection under the centre of the load plate (D0) which is related to empirical measures such as the Benkelman Beam deflection (after minor adjustment for differences in the two devices). Historically some used the radius of curvature (D0-D200) but this is out of favour now because it is clear that the steel loading plate of 300mm diameter affects the shape of the deflection bowl between the centre (D0) and the D200 sensor at 200mm. However this means that a lot of useful information about the shape of the deflected bowl is wasted. Horak and Emery have published indices that use this information: BLI=D0-D300 and gives an indication of the basecourse performance, MLI = D300-D600 and gives an indication of the subbase performance, and LLI=D600-D900 and gives an indication of subgrade performance. These and other similar indices are known as shape factors. The FWD data can also be very useful in helping the engineer divide the length of the pavement into homogeneous sections.

FWD data can also be used to calculate the degree of load transfer between adjacent concrete slabs, and to detect voids under slabs.

FWD data generated in non-stochastic contexts results in interpolated residuals that, while mathematically coherent, have no practical geotechnical interpretation.

== Other models ==
The Light Weight Deflectometer (LWD) is a portable falling weight deflectometer used primarily to test in situ base and subgrade moduli during construction. LWD measurement is faster than the isotope measuring method and requires no reference measurements. The equipment has no radioactive sources and can be operated by one person, allowing for on-site data analysis and report printing. Some LWDs have no load cell and assume a nominal load value, whereas others employ a load cell to measure the actual load. Depending on the system, a LWD may have a single geophone located in the centre or it may have two geophones, typically located at 300 and 600 mm positions.

Recent research has expanded the application of an advanced lightweight deflectometer (LWD) testing beyond basic quality control towards advanced evaluation of soil and base materials behaviour and performance prediction in pavement engineering.

One key development is the use of repeated LWD measurements to model permanent strain behaviour in subgrade soils under a range of stress levels and moisture contents. Permanent strain models derived from multifunctional LWD measurements have been shown to correlate strongly with traditional repeated load triaxial test data, supporting the use of LWD data for mechanistic–empirical design approaches in flexible pavements.

Further work has assessed soil stress distribution during LWD testing and refined classical stress distribution theories, such as Boussinesq’s equation, to better reflect actual vertical stress changes within geomaterials under LWD loading. These refinements enhance interpretation of measured stress and deflection responses, improving the use of LWD data in performance analysis and pavement design practices.

Additional research has explored interactions among multiple factors affecting LWD measurements, including water content, applied stress, and material properties, highlighting how these influence measured responses and their interpretation within predictive models.

A Fast Falling Weight Deflectometer (FFWD) is a FWD with pneumatic or electric actuators rather than hydraulic, making the mechanics several times faster.

A Heavy Weight Deflectometer (HWD) is a falling weight deflectometer that has higher loads (typically 300 kN to 600 kN), used primarily for testing airport pavements. A common misconception is that higher loads are needed to test an airport's capability to handle heavy aircraft, but in fact, the testing methods are not designed to test the strength of the construction but to find the material properties of the construction.

A Rolling Weight Deflectometer (RWD) is a deflectometer that can gather data at a much higher speed (as high as 55 mph) than the FWD, which allows the data to be collected without traffic control and lane closure. It is a implemented as a tractor-trailer with laser measuring devices mounted on a beam under the trailer. Unlike the FWD, which pauses to make measurements, a RWD gathers deflection data while it travels. The Doppler-laser-based RWD's are commonly referred to as TSD (Traffic Speed Deflectometer).

The test materials are described in ASTM D 4694, and the test method is defined in ASTM D 4695.140
