= Albert Atterberg =

Swedish chemist and agronomist (1846 –1916)

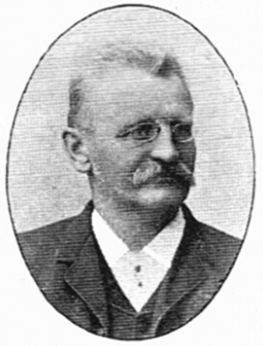
Albert Mauritz Atterberg

Albert Mauritz Atterberg (19 March 1846 – 4 April 1916) was a Swedish chemist and agricultural scientist who created the Atterberg limits, which are commonly referred to by geotechnical engineers and engineering geologists today. In Sweden, he is equally known for creating the Atterberg grain size scale, which remains the one in use.

Atterberg received his Ph.D. in chemistry from Uppsala University in 1872 and then stayed there as a lecturer in analytical chemistry until 1877, during which time he traveled across Sweden and abroad to study the latest developments in organic chemistry. He then went on to become the principal of the Chemical Station and Seed Control Institute at Kalmar, publishing numerous papers on agricultural research dealing with the classification of varieties of oats and corn between 1891 and 1900.

It was towards the age of fifty-four that Atterberg, while continuing his work on chemistry, began to focus his efforts on the classification and plasticity of soils, for which he is most remembered. Atterberg was apparently the first to suggest the limit <0.002 mm as a classification for clay particles. He found that plasticity to be a particular characteristic of clay and as a result of his investigations arrived at the consistency limits which bear his name today. He also conducted studies aiming to identify the specific minerals that give a clayey soil its plastic nature.

Atterberg's work on soil classification gained formal recognition from the International Society of Soil Science in a Berlin Conference in 1913. Two year later a U.S. Bureau of Standards report stated that Atterberg's method was "as simple a one as could be devised, and...it is well that we should become familiar with it." The U.S. Bureau of Chemistry and Soils adopted it in 1937.

The importance of Atterberg's work has never been fully realized in his own field of agricultural science, nor in other subjects concerned with clays, such as ceramics. Its introduction to the field of geotechnical engineering was due to Karl Terzaghi, who came to realise its importance at a relatively early stage of his research. Terzaghi's assistant, Arthur Casagrande, standardized the tests in his paper in 1932 and the procedures have been followed worldwide ever since.

He was the uncle of the composer Kurt Atterberg.
