= Shear vane test =

Method of measuring the shear strength of soil

Symbol used in drawings

Diagram showing the rod and vane inserted into the soil

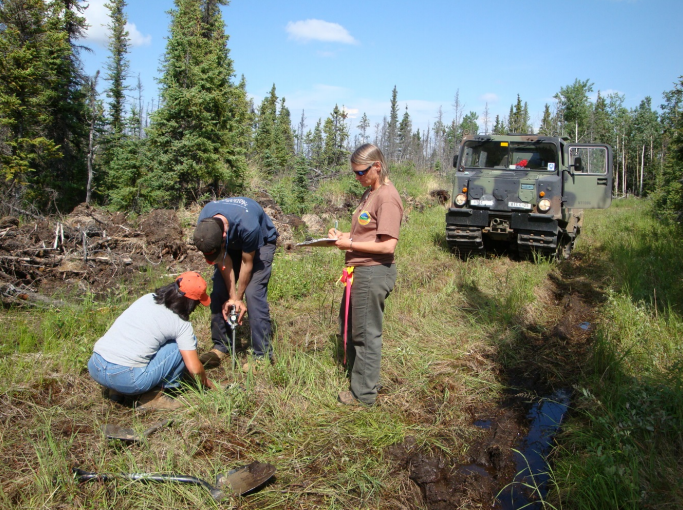
US Army Corps of Engineers personnel carrying out a shear vane test

The shear vane test is a method of measuring the undrained shear strength of a cohesive soil. The test is carried out with equipment consisting of a rod with vanes mounted to it that is inserted into the ground and rotated. A gauge on the top of the rod measures the torque required to cause failure of the soil and provides a conversion to shear strength. The equipment has been in use since at least 1948. The equipment has also been used since at least 1967 to assess the shear strength of packs of snow at risk of forming a slab avalanche.

== Equipment used ==
The shear vane consists of a straight rod with four vanes on one end, arranged in a cruciform pattern, and a combined handle/torque gauge. The rod is inserted into the soil to a depth of 500mm and rotated at a rate of between 6 and 12 degrees per minute. Once the soil fails in shear the gauge shows the maximum torque applied. The gauge is marked with a scale that converts the torque into a shear strength (measured in kiloNewtons per square metre). There are two scales for use with two different sizes of vane – 150-by-75-millimetre (5.9 in × 3.0 in) vanes are used for soils with shear strengths up to 50 kN/m^{2} and 100-by-50-millimetre (3.9 in × 2.0 in) vanes for stronger soils. In the United Kingdom the methodology is governed by British Standard 1377 (Methods of test for soils for civil engineering purposes).

The shear vane is a simple and portable piece of equipment. The test is suitable for clay soils classified as soft to firm. By remoulding the sample and retesting an indication of the sensitivity of the clay can also be found. The test has also been used to measure the shear strength of mortar mixes, where it has been shown to correlate with the slump value. The equipment has also been used since at least 1967 to assess the shear strength of packs of snow at risk of forming a slab avalanche.

== History and research ==
The test was pioneered by L Carlson and AW Skempton in 1948. There has been some dispute over its accuracy since then. Carlson and Skempton believed that it provided a higher value than that indicated by unconfined compressive tests and in fact agreed better with the values expected in geotechnical theory. However 1973 research claimed that the test actually provided an under-estimate of shear strength compared to compressive tests where a good quality of sample is obtainable. The discrepancy has been attributed to the disturbance of the sample caused by the insertion of the shear vane.
