= St John's College, Cambridge =

College of the University of Cambridge, in England

Coordinates: 52°12′29″N 0°7′0″E

St John's College
- University of Cambridge
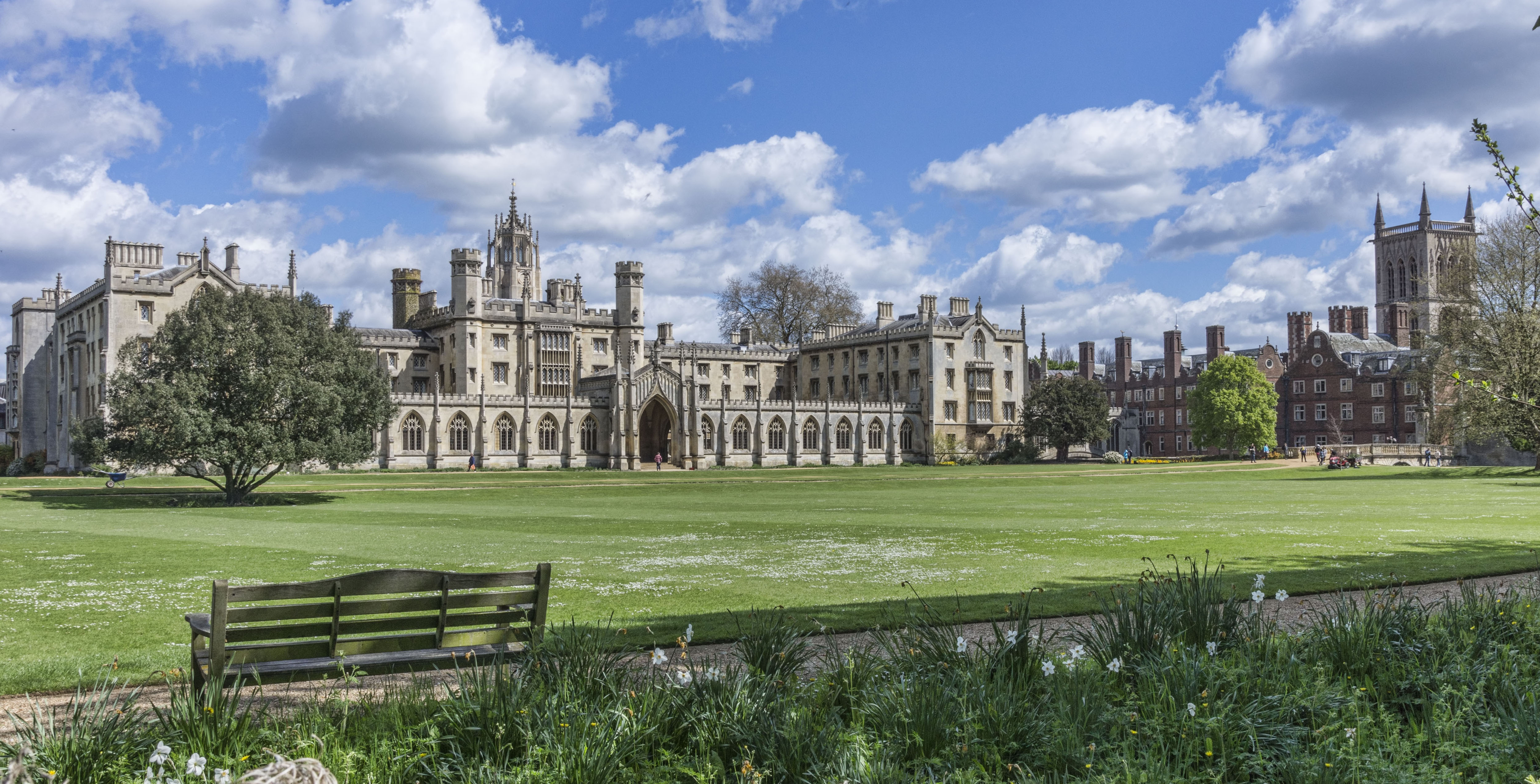
- View over the rear buildings from the Backs

- Arms of St John's College, being the arms of the foundress Lady Margaret Beaufort; Arms: Royal arms of England a bordure componée azure and argent
Scarf colours: navy, with two equally-spaced narrow stripes of Cambridge blue edged with red
- Location: St John's Street (map)
- Full name: The College of St John the Evangelist in the University of Cambridge
- Abbreviation: JN
- Motto: Souvent me Souvient (Old French; motto of the foundress Lady Margaret Beaufort)
- Motto in English: I often remember / Remember me often
- Founder: Lady Margaret Beaufort
- Established: 1511; 515 years ago
- Named after: St John the Evangelist
- Sister colleges: Balliol College, Oxford; Trinity College Dublin
- Master: Heather Hancock, from October 2020
- Undergraduates: 634 (2022–23)
- Postgraduates: 368 (2022–23)
- Endowment: £768.3m (2023)
- Website: www.joh.cam.ac.uk
- JCR: sjcjcr.com
- SBR: sbr.soc.srcf.net
- Boat club: Lady Margaret Boat Club

Map
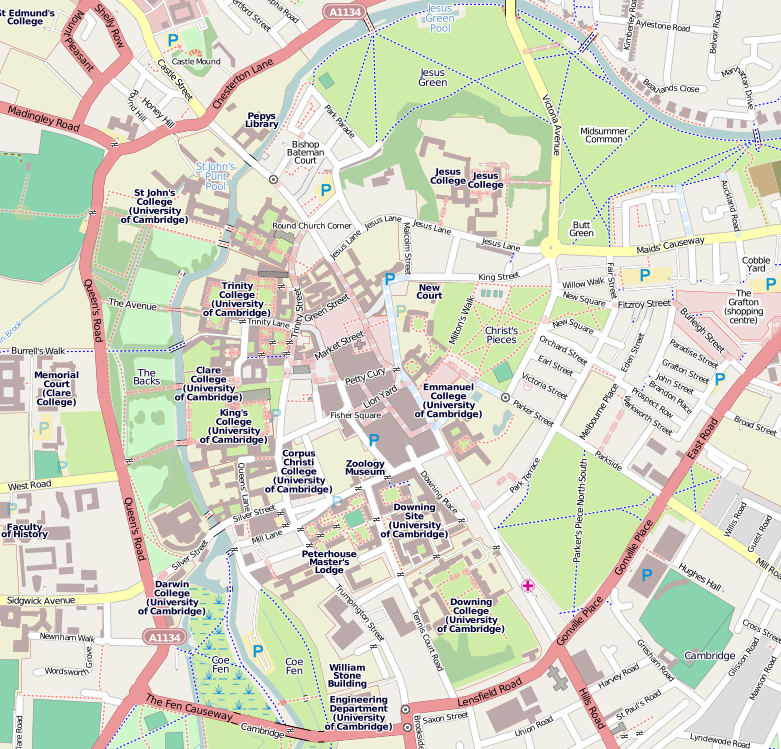
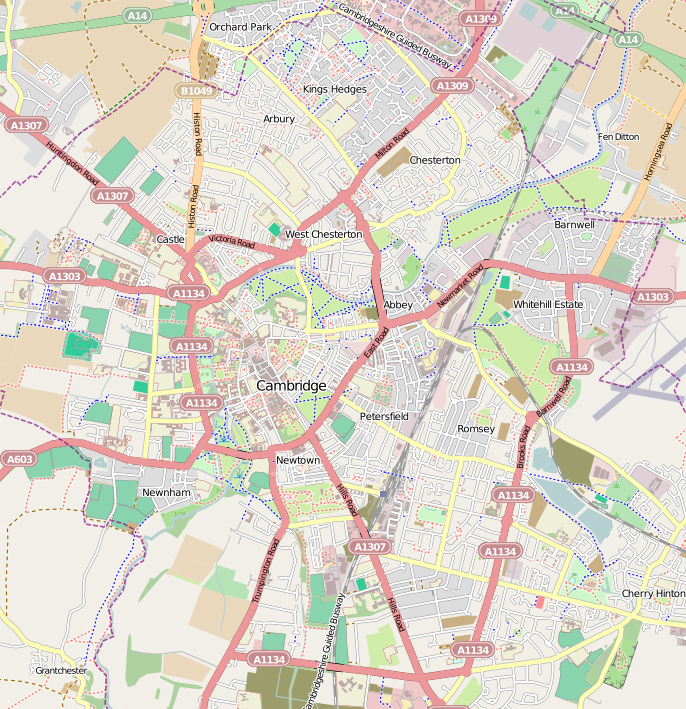
- Location within Central Cambridge Location within Cambridge

St John's College is a constituent college of the University of Cambridge, founded by the Tudor matriarch Lady Margaret Beaufort. In constitutional terms, the college is a charitable corporation established by a charter dated 9 April 1511. The aims of the college, as specified by its statutes, are the promotion of education, religion, learning and research. It is one of the largest Oxbridge colleges in terms of student numbers. For 2022, St John's was ranked 6th of 29 colleges in the Tompkins Table (the annual league table of Cambridge colleges) with over 35 per cent of its students earning first-class honours. It is the second wealthiest college in Oxford and Cambridge, after its neighbour Trinity College, Cambridge. The college occupies a site by the River Cam, and features eleven courts, the Bridge of Sighs, and a chapel designed by George Gilbert Scott.

Members of the college include the winners of twelve Nobel Prizes, seven prime ministers, twelve archbishops of various countries, at least two princes and three saints. The Romantic poet William Wordsworth studied at St John's, as did William Wilberforce and Thomas Clarkson, two abolitionists who led the movement that brought slavery to an end in the British Empire. Prince William was affiliated with the college while undertaking a university-run course in estate management in 2014.

St John's is well known for its choir, its members' success in a variety of inter-collegiate sporting competitions and its annual May Ball. The Cambridge Apostles and the Cambridge University Moral Sciences Club were founded by members of the college. The Oxford and Cambridge Boat Race tradition began with a St John's student and the college boat club, Lady Margaret Boat Club, is the oldest in the university. In 2011, the college celebrated its quincentenary, an event marked by a visit of Queen Elizabeth II and Prince Philip, Duke of Edinburgh.

== History ==
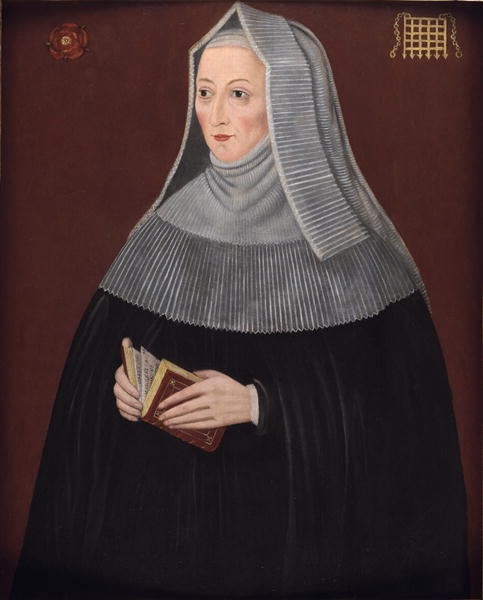
Lady Margaret Beaufort who founded the college

The site was originally occupied by the Hospital of St John the Evangelist, probably founded around 1200. The hospital infirmary was located where the east end of the current chapel now stands. By 1470 Thomas Rotherham, Chancellor of the university, extended to the hospital the privileges of membership of the university. This led to St John's House, as it was then known, being conferred the status of a college. By the early 16th century the hospital was dilapidated and suffering from a lack of funds. Lady Margaret Beaufort, having endowed Christ's College, sought to found a new college, and chose the hospital site at the suggestion of John Fisher, her chaplain and Bishop of Rochester. However, Lady Margaret died without having mentioned the foundation of St John's in her will, and it was largely the work of Fisher that ensured that the college was founded. He had to obtain the approval of King Henry VIII of England, the Pope through the intermediary Polydore Vergil, and the Bishop of Ely to suppress the religious hospital (which by then held only a Master and three Augustinian brethren) and convert it to a college.

The college received its charter on 9 April 1511. Further complications arose in obtaining money from the estate of Lady Margaret to pay for the foundation, and it was not until 22 October 1512 that a codicil was obtained in the court of the Archbishop of Canterbury. In November 1512 the Court of Chancery allowed Lady Margaret's executors to pay for the foundation of the college from her estates. When the executors took over they found most of the old hospital buildings beyond repair, but they repaired the chapel and incorporated it into the new college. A kitchen and hall were added, and an imposing gate tower was constructed for the College Treasury. The doors were to be closed each day at dusk, sealing the monastic community from the outside world.

Over the following five hundred years, the college expanded westwards towards the River Cam. The first three courts are arranged in enfilade.

The college has retained its relationship with Shrewsbury School since 1578 when the headmaster Thomas Ashton assisted in drawing up ordinances to govern the school. Under these rulings, the borough bailiffs (mayors after 1638) had the power to appoint masters, with Ashton's old college, St John's, having an academic veto. Since then, the appointment of Johnian academics to the governing body, and the historic awards of 'closed' Shrewsbury Exhibitions, have continued. A former Master of St John's, Chris Dobson, was an ex officio governor of the school from 2007.

St John's College first admitted women in October 1981, when K. M. Wheeler was admitted to the fellowship, along with nine female graduate students. The first women undergraduates arrived a year later.

== Buildings and grounds ==
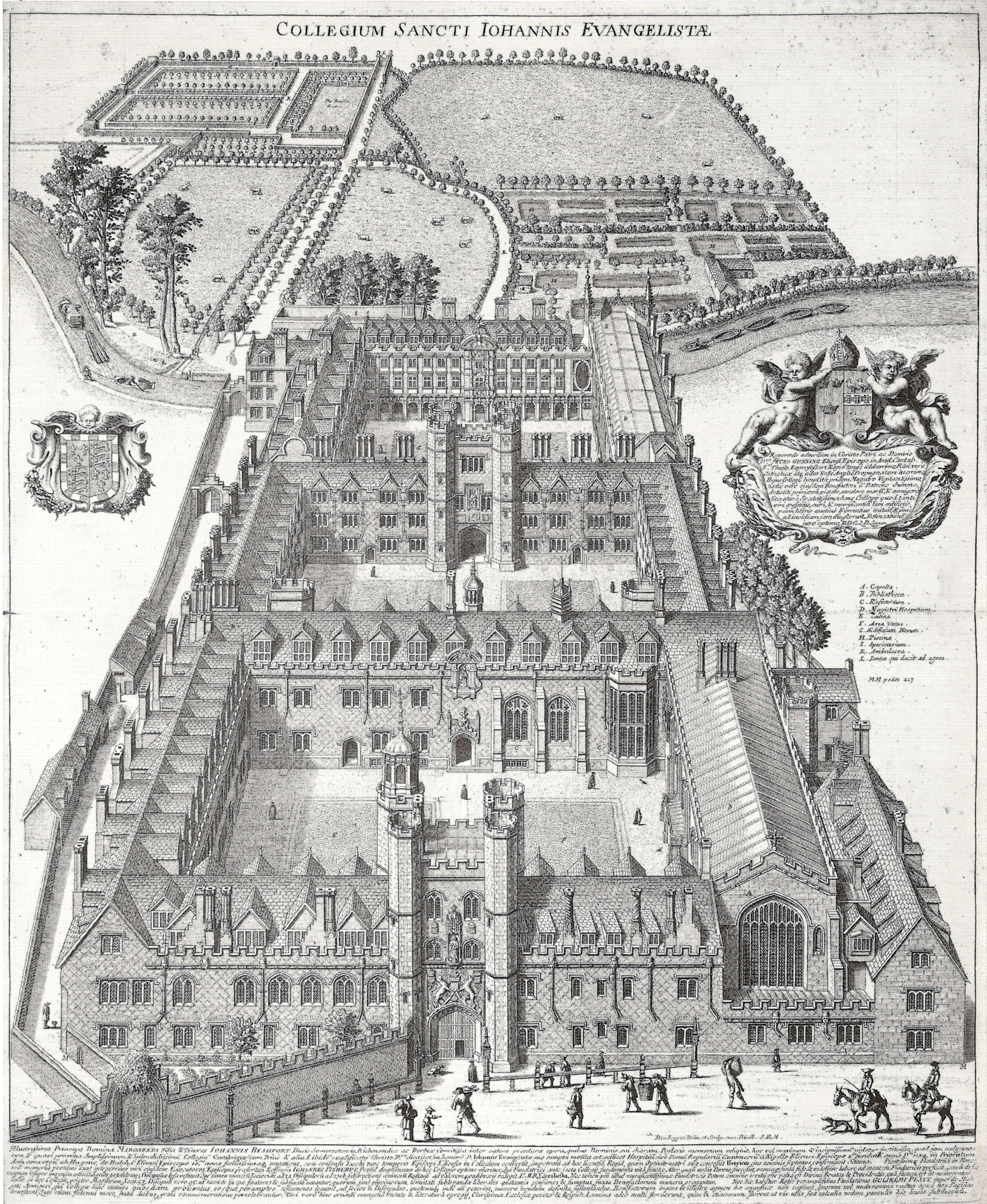
Engraving of St John's College, David Loggan, c. 1685

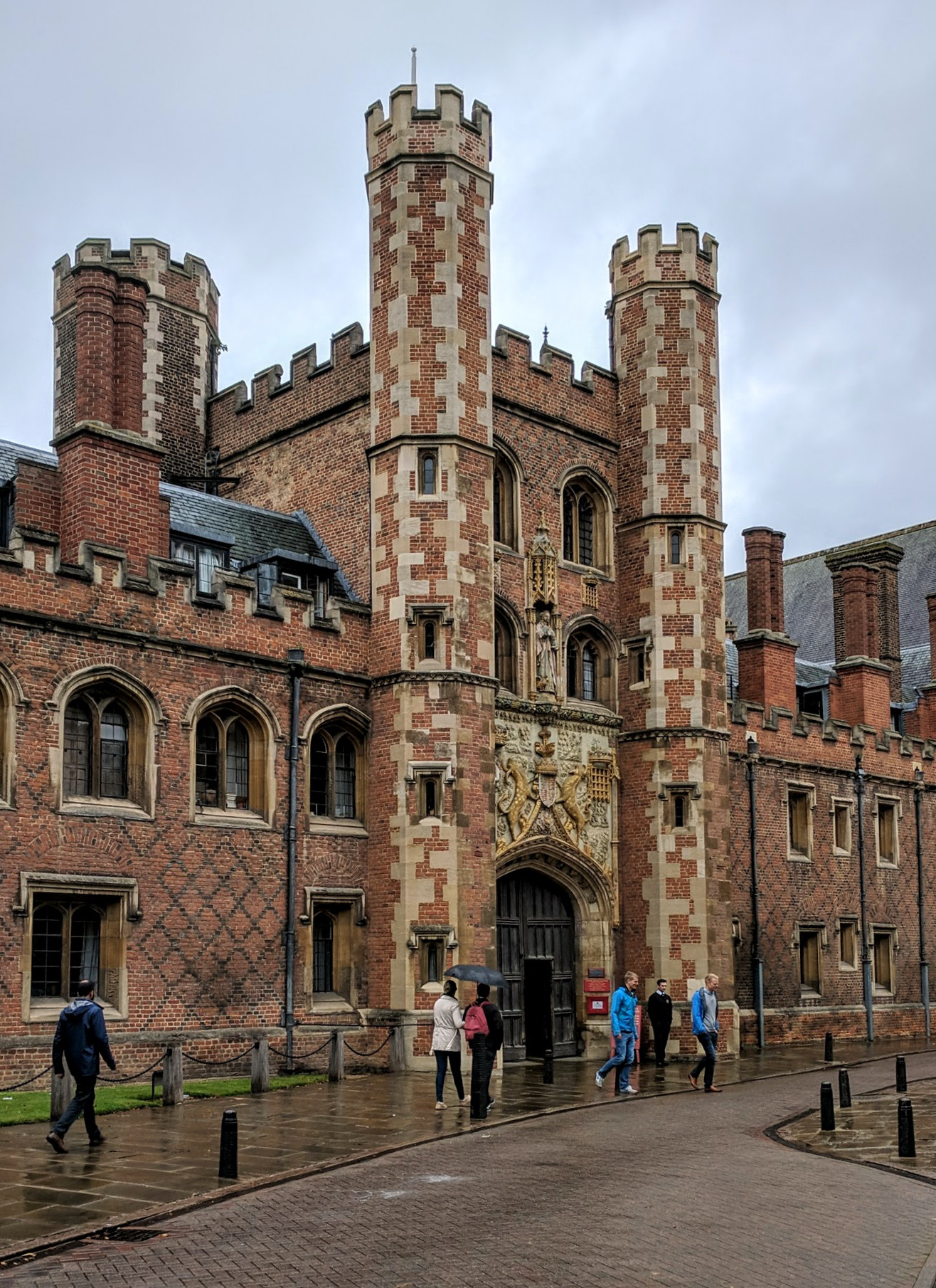
The Main Gate of St John's College on St John's Street, decorated with the arms of the foundress

=== Great Gate ===
St John's Great Gate follows the contemporary pattern employed previously at Christ's College and Queens' College. The gatehouse is crenellated and adorned with the arms of the foundress Lady Margaret Beaufort. Above these are displayed her ensigns, the Red Rose of Lancaster and Portcullis. The college arms are flanked by heraldic beasts known as yales, mythical creatures with elephants' tails, antelopes' bodies, goats' heads, and swivelling horns. Above them is a tabernacle containing a socle figure of St John the Evangelist, an Eagle at his feet and a symbolic, poisoned chalice in his hands. The fan vaulting above is contemporary with the tower and may have been designed by William Swayne, a master mason of King's College Chapel.

=== First Court ===
First Court is entered via the Great Gate and is highly architecturally varied. First Court was converted from the hospital on the foundation of the college, and constructed between 1511 and 1520. Though it has since been gradually changed, the front (east) range is still much as it appeared when first erected in the 16th century. The south range was refaced between 1772 and 1776 in the Georgian style by the local architect, James Essex, as part of an abortive attempt to modernise the entire court in the same fashion. The most dramatic alteration to the original, Tudor court, however, remains the Victorian amendment of the north range, which involved the demolition of the original medieval chapel and the construction of a new, far larger set of buildings in the 1860s. These included the chapel, designed by Sir George Gilbert Scott, which includes in its interior some pieces saved from the original chapel. It is the third tallest building in Cambridge. The alteration of the north range necessitated the restructuring of the connective sections of First Court; another bay window was added to enlarge the college's hall, and a new building was constructed to the north of Great Gate. Parts of the First Court were used as a prison in 1643 during the English Civil War. In April 2011, Queen Elizabeth II visited St John's College to inaugurate a new pathway in First Court, which passes close to the ruins of the Old Chapel.

=== Dining hall ===
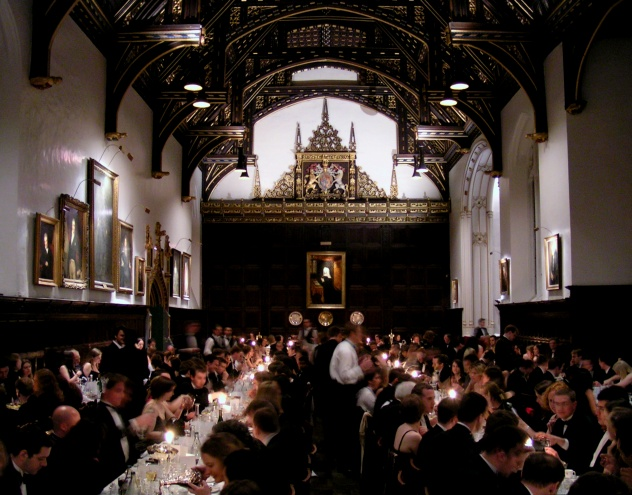
The 16th-century dining hall has a hammerbeam roof

The college's hall has a fine hammerbeam roof, painted in black and gold and decorated with the armorial devices of its benefactors. The hall is lined to cill level with linenfold panelling which dates from 1528 to 1529 and has a five-bay screen, surmounted by the Royal Arms. Above is a hexagonal louvre, dating to 1703. The room was extended from five to eight bays according to designs by Sir George Gilbert Scott in 1863. It has two bay windows, containing heraldic glass dating from the 15th to 19th centuries. In 1564, Queen Elizabeth rode into the college's Hall on horseback, during a state visit to Cambridge.

=== Second Court ===
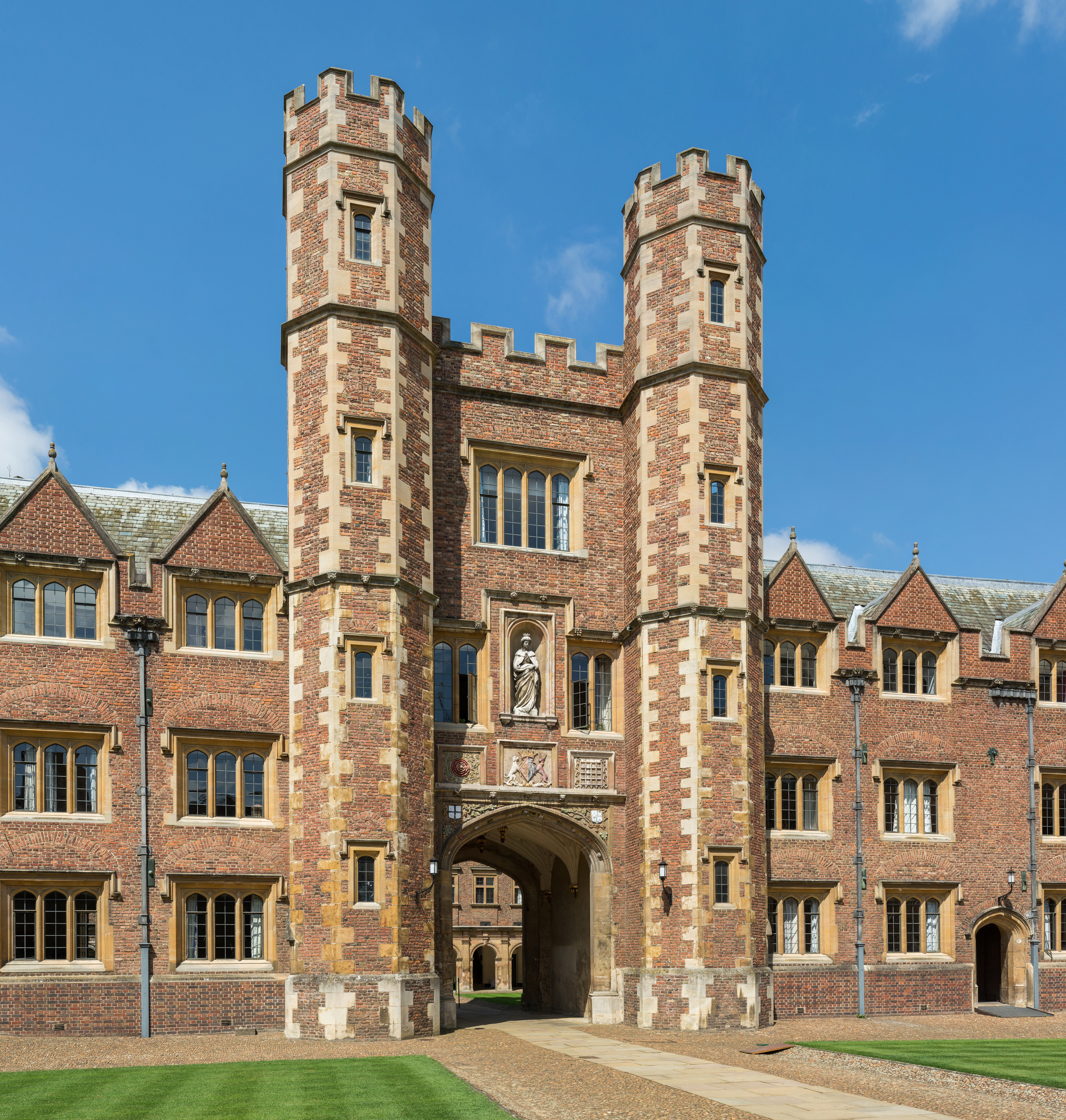
The tower of Second Court leading to Third Court

Second Court, built from 1598 to 1602, has been described as 'the finest Tudor court in England'. Built atop the demolished foundations of an earlier, far smaller court, Second Court was begun in 1598 to the plans of Ralph Symons of Westminster, and Gilbert Wigge of Cambridge. Their original architectural drawings are housed in the college's library and are the oldest surviving plans for an Oxford or Cambridge college building. It was financed by the Countess of Shrewsbury, whose arms and statue stand above the court's western gatehouse. The court's Oriel windows are perhaps its most striking feature, though the dominating Shrewsbury Tower to the west is the most imposing. This gatehouse, built as a mirror image of the college's Great Gate, contains a statue of the benefactress Mary Talbot, Countess of Shrewsbury, added in 1671. Behind the Oriel window of the north range lies the Long Gallery, a promenading room that was, before its segmentation, 148 feet long. In this room, the treaty between England and France was signed that established the marriage of King Charles I of England to Queen Henrietta Maria. In the 1940s, parts of the D-day landings were planned there. Second Court is also home to the college's 'triple set', K6.

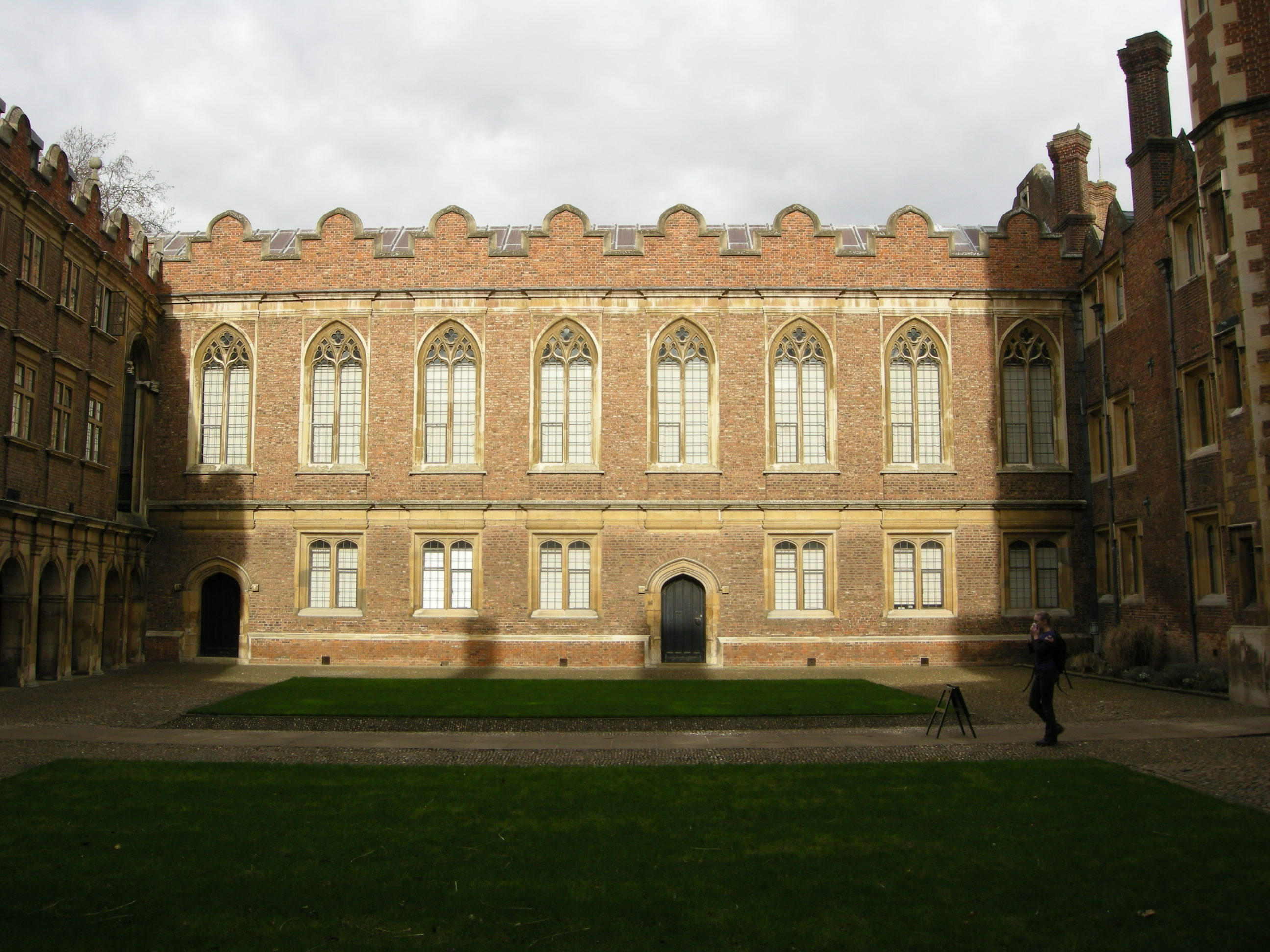
View of Third Court and the Old Library

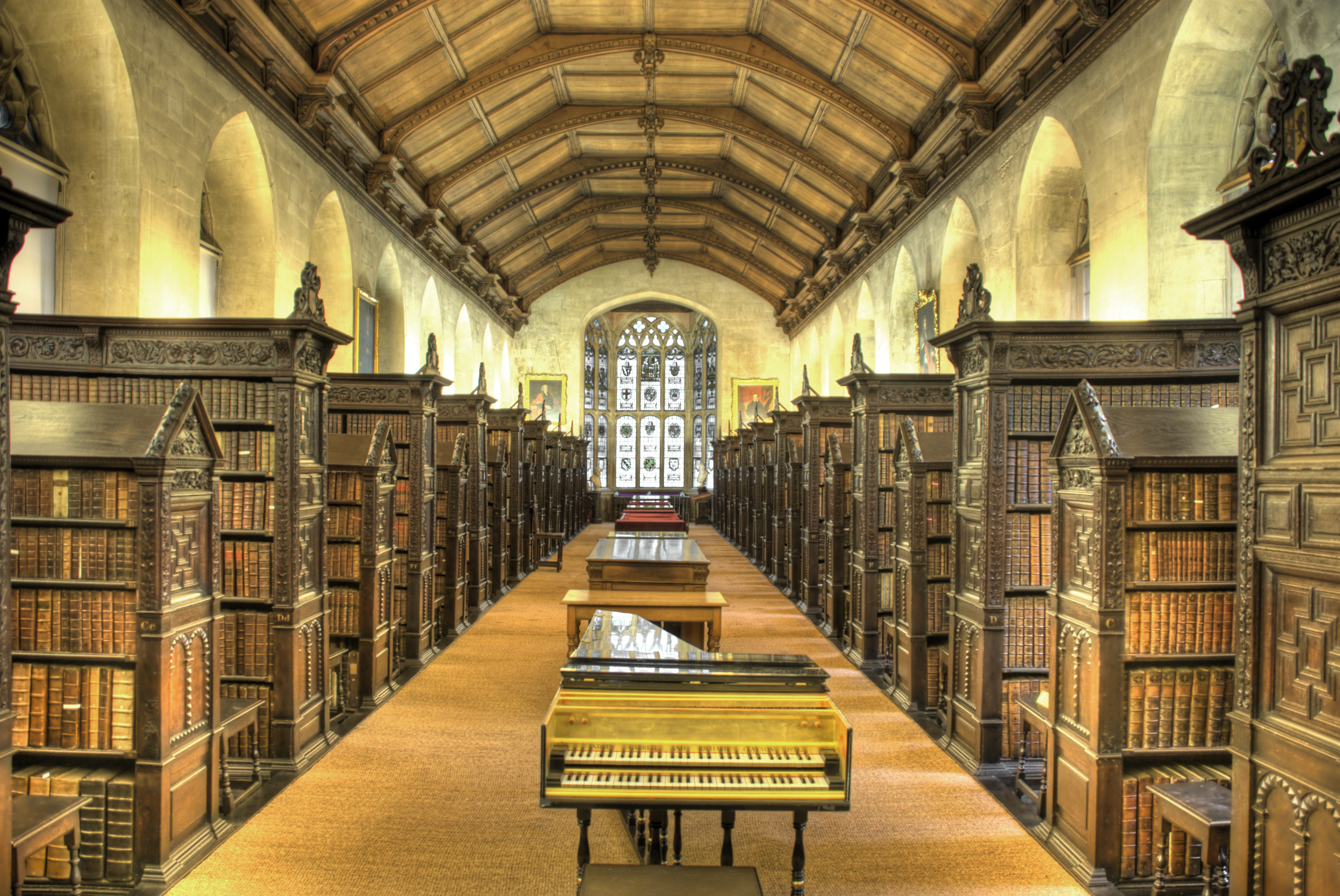
The interior of the Old Library

=== Library ===
The Old Library was built in 1624, largely with funds donated by John Williams, Bishop of Lincoln. Hearing of the college's urgent need for greater library space, Williams donated £1,200 anonymously, later revealing his identity and donating a total of £2,011 towards the library's total cost of £3,000. The library's bay window overlooks the River Cam and bears the letters "ILCS" on it, standing for Iohannes Lincolniensis Custos Sigilli, or "John of Lincoln, Keeper of the Seal". The original intention of the college had been to construct an elegant classical building supported by pillared porticos, but Bishop Williams insisted on a more traditional design. Thus, though the college lays claim to too few examples of neo-classical design, the library stands as one of the earliest examples of English neo-Gothic architecture.

=== Third Court ===
Third Court is entered through Shrewsbury Tower, which from 1765 to 1859 housed an observatory. Each of its ranges was built in a different style. Following the completion of the college library in 1624, the final sides of the Third Court were added between 1669 and 1672, after the college had recovered from the trauma of the English Civil War. The additions included a fine set of Dutch-gabled buildings backing onto the River Cam and a 'window-with-nothing-behind-it' that was designed to solve the problem of connecting the windowed library with the remainder of the court.

=== Kitchen or Wren Bridge ===
This was the first stone bridge erected at St John's College, continuing from Kitchen Lane. The crossing lies south of the Bridge of Sighs and was a replacement for a wooden bridge that had stood on the site since the foundation's early days as a hospital. Though Sir Christopher Wren submitted designs for the bridge, it was eventually built on a different site by a local mason, Robert Grumbold, who also built Trinity College Library. As with the Library, Grumbold's work was based on Wren's designs, and the bridge has become known as "the Wren Bridge".

=== Kitchen Court ===
This tiny court, formed within the walls of the old Kitchen Lane, is used as an outdoor dining area.

=== Bridge of Sighs ===
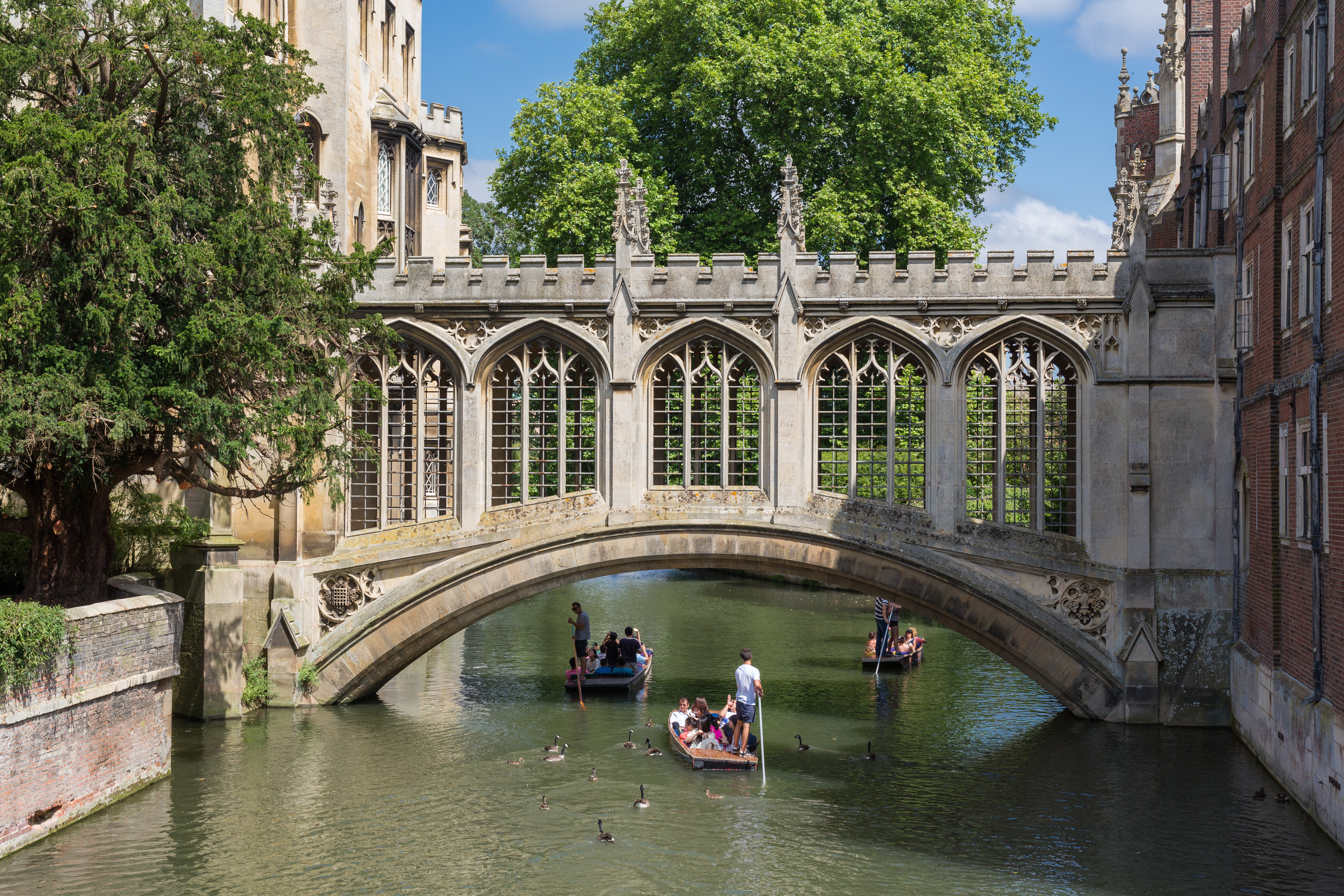
St John's Bridge of Sighs

Though it bears little resemblance to its namesake in Venice, the bridge connecting Third Court to New Court, originally known as New Bridge, is now commonly known as the Bridge of Sighs. It is one of the most photographed buildings in Cambridge and was described by the visiting Queen Victoria as "so pretty and picturesque". It is a single-span bridge of stone with a highly decorative Neo-Gothic covered footwalk over with traceried openings. There is a three-bay arcade at the east end of the bridge. The architect was Henry Hutchinson.

=== New Court ===
The 19th-century neo-Gothic New Court, probably one of the best-known buildings in Cambridge, was the first major building to be built by the college on the west side of the river. Designed by Thomas Rickman and Henry Hutchinson, New Court was constructed between 1826 and 1831 to accommodate the college's rapidly increasing numbers of students. Despite the college's original intention to get the architects to build another copy of the Second Court, plans were accepted for a fashionably romantic building in the 'Gothic' style. It is also likely that the decision to utilise the neo-Gothic style was made to emulate and compete with the neo-Gothic screen of King's College, designed by William Wilkins and already two years under construction at the time of John's commission. It is a three-sided court of tall Gothic Revival buildings, closed on the fourth side by an open, seven-bayed cross-vaulted cloister and gateway. It is four storeys high, has battlements and is pinnacled. The main portal features a fan vault with a large octagonal pendant, which resembles that of the ceiling found in Bishop Alcock's late 15th-century chapel in Ely Cathedral. The interior of the main building retains many of its original features including ribbed plaster ceilings. Its prominent location (particularly when glimpsed from the river) and flamboyant, tiered design have led it to be nicknamed "The Wedding Cake".

=== Chapel ===
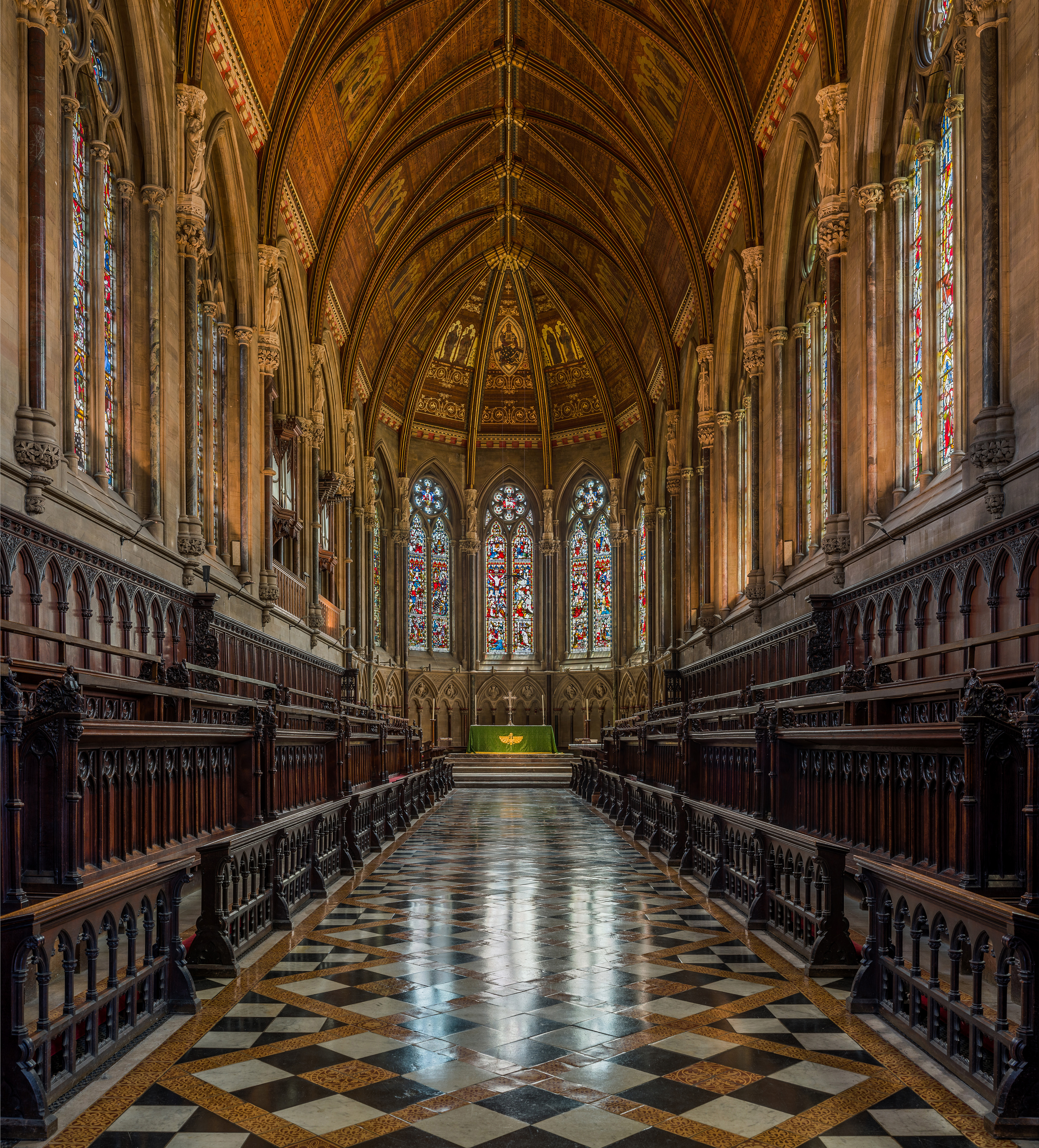
Inside St John's College Chapel

The Chapel of St John's College is entered by the northwest corner of First Court. It was constructed between 1866 and 1869 to replace the smaller mediaeval chapel which dated back to the 13th century. When in 1861 the college's administration decided that a new building was needed, Sir George Gilbert Scott was selected as the architect. He had recently finished work on the chapel at Exeter College, Oxford, and went about constructing the chapel of St John's College along similar lines, drawing inspiration from Sainte-Chapelle in Paris.

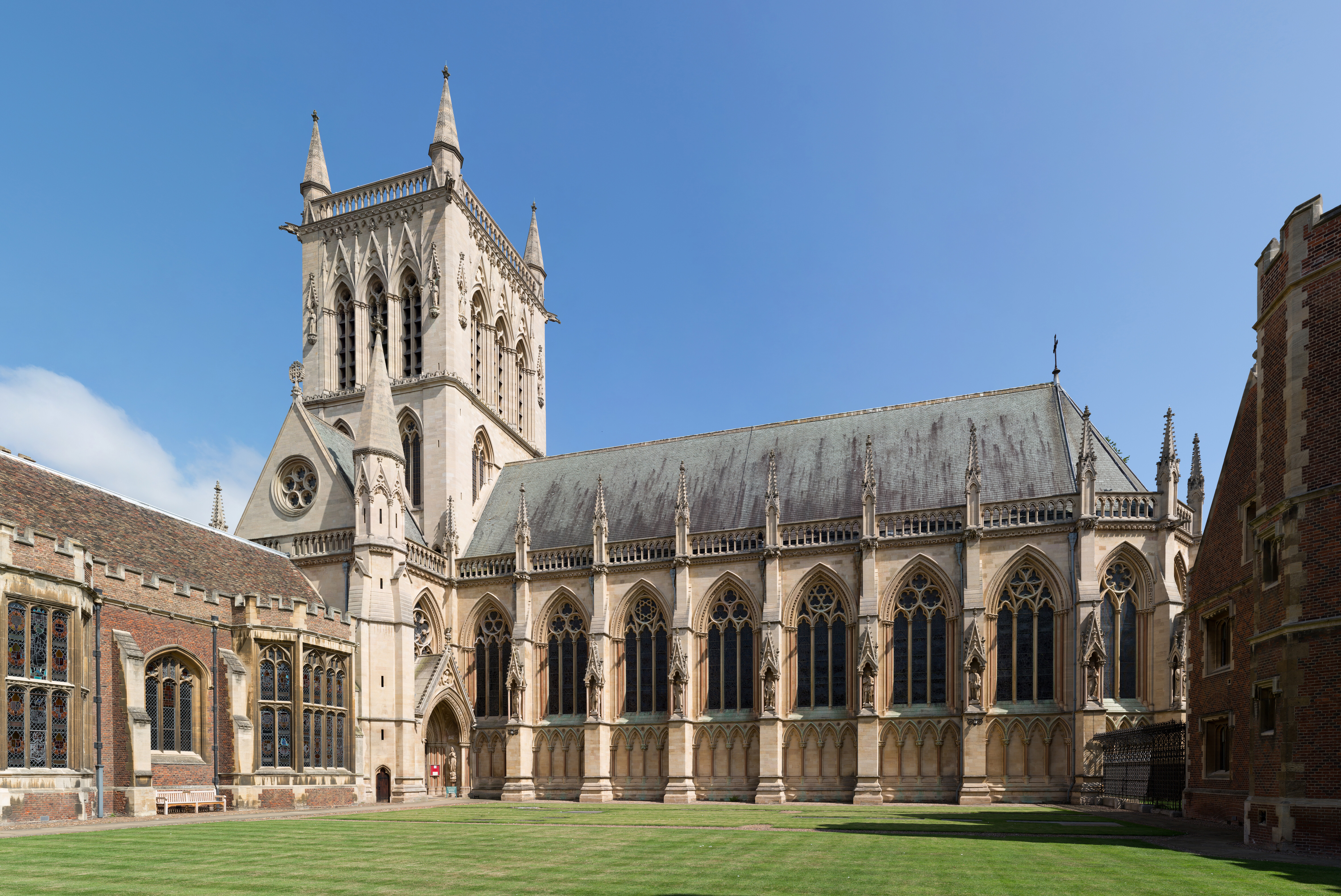
St John's College Chapel was designed by Sir George Gilbert Scott

The benefactor Henry Hoare offered a downpayment of £3000 to finance the chapel's construction, in addition to which he promised to pay £1000 a year if a tower were added to Scott's original plans, which had included only a small flèche. Work began, but Hoare's death from a railway accident left the college £3000 short of his expected benefaction. The tower was completed, replete with louvres but left without bells; it is based on Pershore Abbey. The tower is 163 ft (50 m) high.

The chapel's antechamber contains statues of Lady Margaret Beaufort and John Fisher. Inside the building is a stone-vaulted ante-chapel, at the end of which hangs a 'Deposition of the Cross' by Anton Rafael Mengs, completed around 1777. The misericords and panelling date from 1516, and were salvaged from the old chapel. The chapel contains some 15th-century glass, but most was cast by Clayton and Bell, Hardman, and Wailes, in around 1869. Freestanding statues and plaques commemorate college benefactors such as James Wood, Master 1815–39, as well as alumni including William Wilberforce, Thomas Clarkson and William Gilbert. The college tower can be climbed and is accessed via a small door on First Court. However, this access was closed in 2016 for the duration that important structural repairs were carried out to the tower Pinnacles and roof.

The chapel is surrounded on three sides by large tabernacles which form part of the external buttresses. Each contains a statue of a prominent college alumnus, alumna or benefactor. The people commemorated are, beginning with the buttress next to the transept on the south side:

- Sir William Cecil, Lord Burghley
- Lucius, Viscount Falkland
- John Williams, Archbishop of York
- Thomas Wentworth, Earl of Strafford
- William Gilbert, natural philosopher
- Roger Ascham, instructor to Elizabeth I
- Mary Cavendish, Countess of Shrewsbury
- Richard Bentley, classicist
- Edward Stillingfleet, bishop of Worcester
- John Overall, Bishop of Coventry, Lichfield and Norwich
- Peter Gunning, Bishop of Chichester and Ely
- Sarah Alston, Duchess of Somerset
- Thomas Clarkson, abolitionist
- Brook Taylor, natural philosopher and mathematician
- Thomas Linacre, founder of the Royal College of Physicians
- Two plinths left vacant
- Thomas Baker, historian

=== Master's Lodge and garden ===
St John's Master's Lodge is located in a grassy clearing to the north of Third Court. It was built at the same time as the new chapel was being constructed and has Tudor fittings, wainscot, portraits and other relics from the demolished north wing of First Court. It has a large garden, and in the winter its westmost rooms have excellent views of the college's old library, the River Cam, and the Bridge of Sighs. The architect was Sir George Gilbert Scott.

=== School of Pythagoras ===
To the west of the Cripps Building lies the School of Pythagoras. Built around 1200, it predates the college by 300 years and is both the oldest secular building in Cambridge and the oldest building continuously in use by a university in Britain. The building now serves as the location for the College Archives. Next to the School of Pythagoras lies Merton Hall. From 1266 until 1959 both the School of Pythagoras and Merton Hall were the property of Merton College, Oxford. Merton Court is the college's eleventh and westernmost court.

=== Buildings and courts since 1900 ===
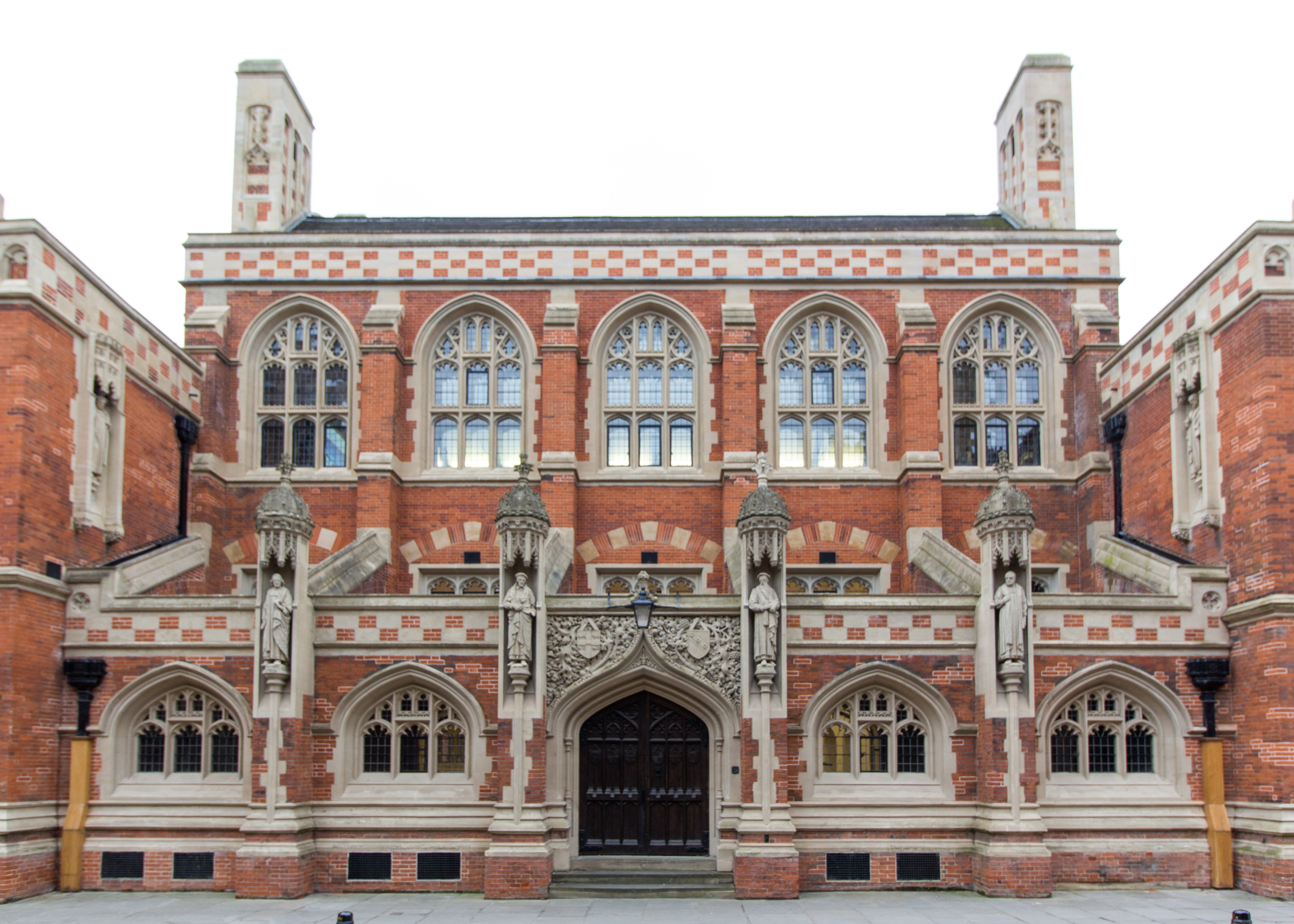
Old Divinity School

Located to the west of the chapel tower lies Chapel Court, which was constructed together with North Court and Forecourt in the 1930s to account for an increase in student numbers. North Court is located just north of Chapel Court and Forecourt is situated to the east, facing St John's Street. The latter is used partly as a car park for fellows and leads to what is now the principal porters' lodge and entrance to the college. All three courts were designed by the architect Edward Maufe.

Further increases in student numbers following the Second World War prompted the college to increase the number of accommodation buildings. The Cripps Building was built in the late 1960s to satisfy this demand. It is located just behind New Court and forms two courts (Upper & Lower River Court). Designed by architects Philip Powell and Hidalgo Moya, the building is Grade II* listed having received an award from the British Architectural Institution. It is considered an exemplar of late 20th-century architectural style and is named after its main benefactor, Humphrey Cripps. In 2014, the building went through an extensive refurbishment programme, which saw renovated accommodation and structural repairs, including the cleaning of the Portland stone from which the building was made.

In 1987 the construction of the Fisher Building was completed. Named after Cardinal John Fisher, the building contains teaching rooms, conference facilities, and a student-run college cinema. It was designed by the architect Peter Boston.

Located opposite the college's Great Gate is All Saints' Yard. The complex is formed from the buildings of the so-called "Triangle Site", a collection of structures owned by the college. An extensive renovation project finished in Michaelmas Term 2012 had a budget of approximately £9.75 million. The centrepiece of the Yard is Corfield Court, named after the project's chief benefactor, Charles Corfield. The site can be entered through one of two card-activated gates or through the School of Divinity. The School of Divinity is the largest building on the site and was built between 1878 and 1879 by Basil Champneys for the University of Cambridge's divinity faculty on land leased by St John's College. Control of the building reverted to St John's when the faculty of divinity moved to a new building on the Sidgwick site in 2000.

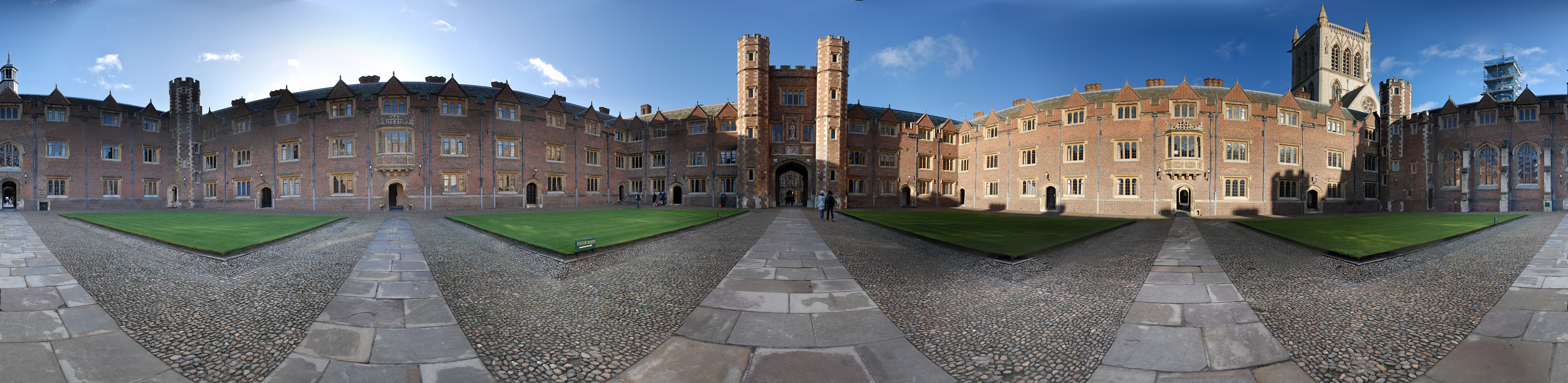
The Second Court of St John's College

== College choirs ==
The Choir of St John's College has a tradition of religious music and has sung the daily services in the College Chapel since the 1670s. The services follow the cathedral tradition of the Church of England, with Evensong being sung during Term six days a week and Sung Eucharist on Sunday mornings. Since 2023 the choir has been directed by Christopher Gray, who was formerly the choirmaster and organist at Truro Cathedral. The boys and girls of the choir are educated and board at St John's College School. During university vacations, the choir carries out engagements elsewhere. Recent tours have taken it to places including the Netherlands, the US and Japan.

The choir has an extensive discography of nearly 100 commercial releases dating back to the 1950s when it was signed to the Decca/Argo label under George Guest. The Choir has since had successful recording contracts with Hyperion Records and Chandos Records, resulting in many critical accolades including a Gramophone Editor's Choice selection for 2015's collection The Call. In 2016 the choir signed to Signum Records on its St John's College imprint. The first recording of this venture was a collection of music by the contemporary composer Jonathan Harvey released in May 2016 to a number two position in the UK specialist classical charts. The imprint will also release non-choral recordings by current and former members of the college.

In October 2021, it was announced that girls and women would join the Choir of St John's College, making it the first choir of an Oxford or Cambridge college to combine "the voices of males and females in both adults and children".

The choral scholars and lay clerks of the choir also form their close harmony group, The Gents of St John's. Their repertoire spans the 15th century through to the modern day, and concert tours have taken them to Europe, the US and Japan. They provide a mixture of classical a cappella music and folksongs, as well as covers of recent chart hits and light-hearted entertainment, and host an annual Christmas concert and garden party.

The college also had a mixed-voice adult choir, St John's Voices, which was founded in 2013 to allow female members of the college to take part in the college's choral tradition. It comprised around 30 members and premiered 3 works. In March 2024, St John's Voices received written notice from the College of their disbandment by June 2024. This decision by the College was met with widespread controversy, as soprano undergraduates at the College would be unable to sing in a College Choir. This sparked a campaign by members of St John's Voices against the disbandment, with an open letter stating that the decision was "regressive" and that the admission of female singers into the Choir of St John's College had been "weaponised against the very existence of another ensemble, supposedly in the name of broadening opportunities". The open letter received national media attention from The Guardian, The Daily Telegraph and The Independent, with notable supporters including former Archbishop of Canterbury and Master of Magdalene College Rowan Williams, music director of the London Symphony Orchestra Sir Simon Rattle, mezzo-soprano Dame Sarah Connolly, and composer John Rutter.

== Traditions and legends ==
=== Shield and arms ===
St John's College and Christ's College, Cambridge both bear the arms of Lady Margaret Beaufort, Countess of Richmond and Derby, mother of Henry VII. These arms are recorded in the College of Arms as being borne by right, and are described as Quarterly: 1 and 4 azure three fleurs-de-lis gold (France, Modern); 2 and 3 gules three lions passant gardant or (England); all within a border compony silver and azure. In addition, both foundations use the Beaufort crest, an eagle displayed arising out of a coronet of roses and fleurs-de-lis all gold, but their title to this is more doubtful. When displayed in their full achievement, the arms are flanked by mythical yales.

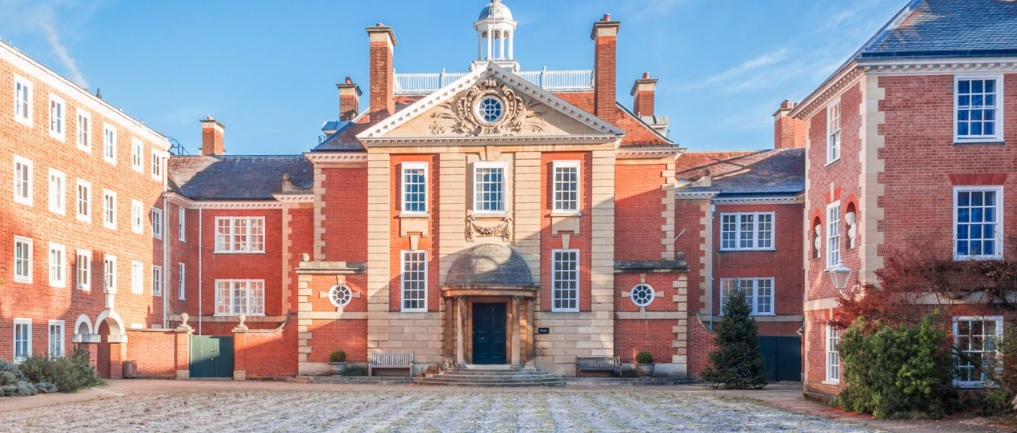
Lady Margaret Hall, Oxford shares its motto with the college, having been founded to honour the legacy of the foundress

=== Motto ===
The college motto is the Old French souvent me souvient of Lady Margaret Beaufort. It is inscribed over gates, lintels and within tympana throughout the college, functioning as a triple pun. It means "often I remember", "think of me often" and, when spoken (exploiting the homonym souvent me sous vient), "I often pass beneath it" (referring to the inscriptions). St John's shares its motto with Christ's College, Cambridge and Lady Margaret Hall, Oxford, which also honour Lady Margaret Beaufort.

=== Prayer ===
The College Prayer is spoken at the end of chapel services. It alludes to the gospel of John in which it is presumed the author mentions himself anonymously as the disciple Jesus loved:"Bless, O Lord, the work of this College, which is called by the name of thy beloved disciple; and grant that love of the brethren and all sound learning may ever grow and prosper here, to thy honour and glory, and to the good of thy people, who, with the Father and the Holy Spirit, livest and reignest, one God, world without end. Amen."

=== Grace ===
The college grace is customarily said before and after dinner in the hall. The reading of grace before dinner (ante prandium) is usually the duty of a scholar of the college; grace after dinner (post prandium) is said by the president or the senior fellow dining. The graces used in St John's have been in continuous use for some centuries and it is known that the ante prandium is based upon mediaeval monastic models. The grace is said shortly after the fellows enter the hall, signalled by the sounding of a gong, and accompanied by the ringing of the college's Grace Bell. The ante prandium is read after the fellows have entered, and the post prandium after they have finished dining:

Grace	Latin	English
Ante Prandium (Before Dinner)	Oculi omnium in te sperant, Domine, et tu das illis cibum in tempore, aperis manum tuam, et imples omne animal benedictione. Benedic, Domine, nos et dona tua, quae de tua largitate sumus sumpturi, et concede ut illis salubriter nutriti, tibi debitum obsequium praestare valeamus, per Jesum Christum Dominum nostrum.	The eyes of all wait upon thee, O Lord: and thou givest them their meat in due season. Thou openest thine hand: and fillest all things living with plenteousness. Bless us, O Lord, and these thy gifts which out of thine abundance we are about to receive, and grant that by their saving nourishment we may have the power to fulfil the obedience due to thee, through Jesus Christ our Lord.
Post Prandium (After Dinner)	Infunde, quaesumus, Domine Deus, gratiam tuam in mentes nostras, ut his donis datis a Margareta Fundatrice nostra aliisque Benefactoribus ad tuam gloriam utamur; et cum omnibus qui in fide Christi decesserunt ad caelestem vitam resurgamus, per Jesum Christum Dominum nostrum. Deus pro sua infinita clementia Ecclesiae suae pacem et unitatem concedat, augustissimum Regem nostrum Carolum conservet, et pacem universo Regno et omnibus Christianis largiatur.	Pour forth, we beseech thee, Lord God, thy grace into our minds, that we may use these gifts, given by Margaret our Foundress and other Benefactors, to thy glory, and together with all who have died in the faith of Christ rise again to life in heaven, through Jesus Christ our Lord. May God, of his infinite mercy, grant his Church unity and peace, preserve our most august king, King Charles, and grant peace to the whole Realm and to all Christians.

=== Rivalry with Trinity ===
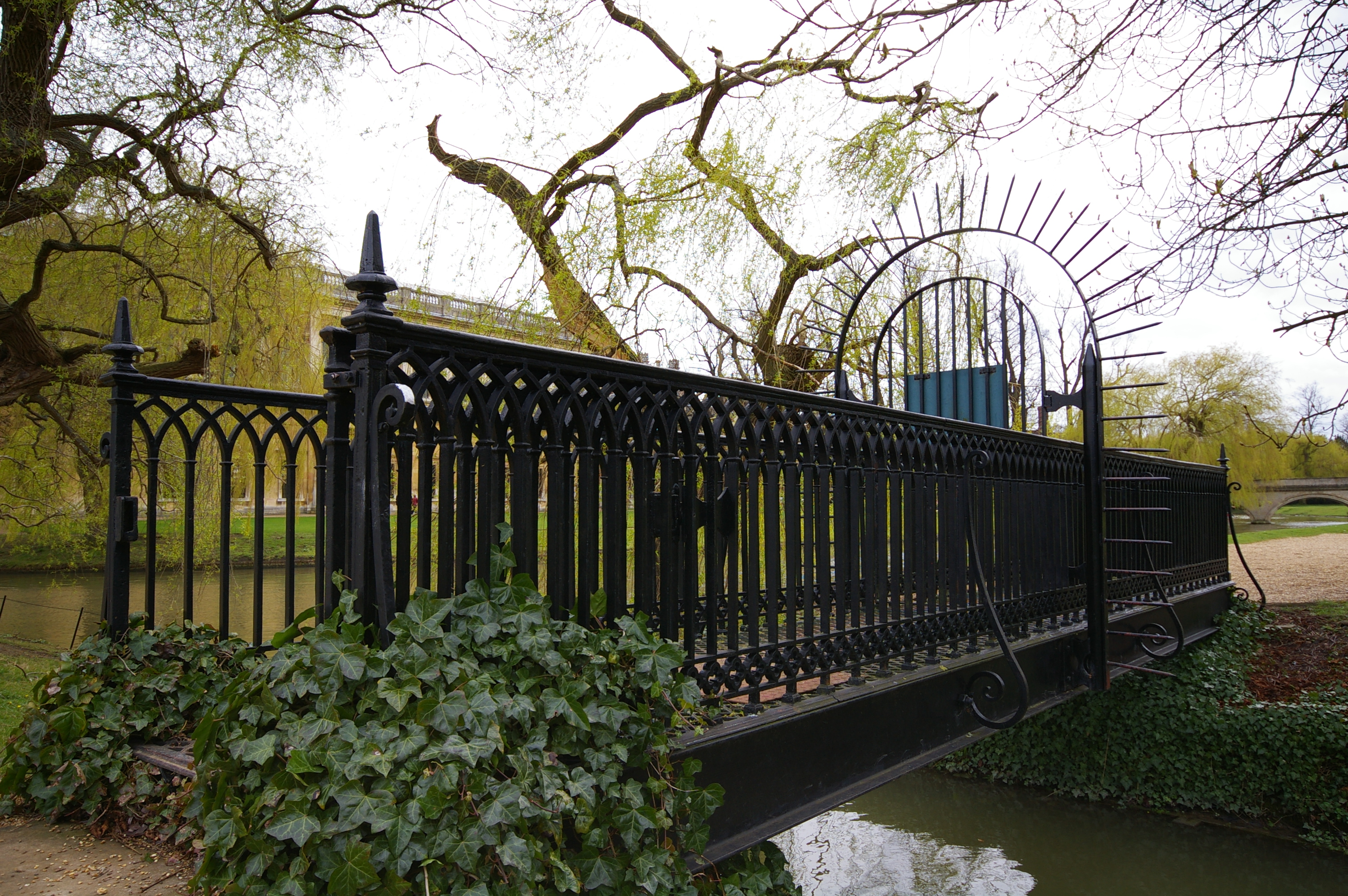
Bridge between St John's and Trinity

St John's remains a great rival of Trinity College, which is its main competitor in sports and academia. The rivalry can be traced to Henry VIII founding Trinity after having ordered the execution of John Fisher, whose efforts had ensured the foundation of St John's. Over the years, numerous anecdotes and myths have arisen, involving students and fellows of both colleges. The rivalry is often cited as the reason why the older courts of Trinity have no "J" staircases, despite including other letters in alphabetical order (it should be mentioned that a far more likely reason is the absence of the letter "J" in the Latin alphabet). There are also two small muzzle-loading cannons on Trinity's bowling green pointing in the direction of John's, though this orientation may be coincidental. Similarly, the eagle on top of the entrance to St John's New Court is said to have been sculptured so that it shuns even the sight of its neighbouring rival. Generally, however, the colleges maintain a cordial relationship with one other; compatriotism led to the splitting of the atomic nucleus in 1932 by Ernest Walton (Trinity) and John Cockcroft (St John's), for which they jointly received the 1951 Nobel Prize in Physics.

=== New Court's clock tower ===
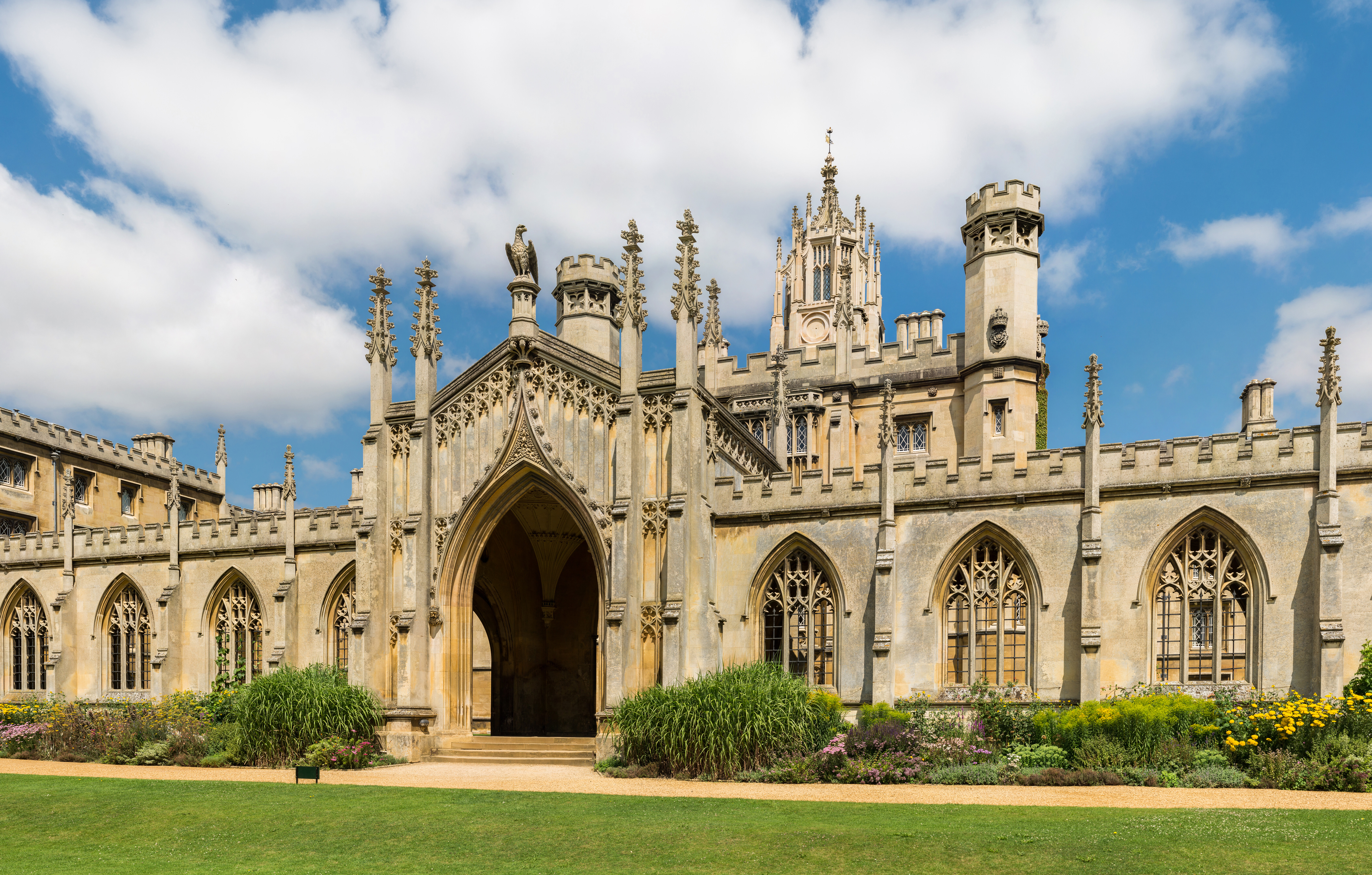
New Court and blank clock tower face

New Court's central cupola has four blank clock faces. These are subject to various apocryphal explanations. One legend maintains that a statute limiting the number of chiming clocks in Cambridge rendered the addition of a mechanism illegal. No such limitation is known to exist. More likely explanations include Hutchinson's fear that the installation of a clockface would spoil the building's symmetry and that the college's financial situation in the early 19th century made completion impossible.

Other legends explaining the absence of clockfaces claim that St John's and its neighbour, Trinity were engaged in a race to build the final (or tallest) clocktower in Cambridge. Supposedly, whichever was finished first (or was tallest) would be permitted to house the 'final' chiming clock in Cambridge. Trinity's Tower was finished first (or, in another version of the same story, was made taller overnight by the addition of a wooden cupola), and its clock was allowed to remain. In truth, the completion of the New Court and Trinity's Clock (which is in King Edward's Tower) was separated by nearly two centuries. Trinity's famous double-striking clock was installed in the 17th century by its then-Master, Richard Bentley, a former student of St John's, who dictated that the clock chime once for Trinity, and once for his alma mater, St John's.

=== Consumption of swan ===
Supposedly, St John's fellows are the only people outside the royal family in the United Kingdom allowed to eat unmarked mute swans. The Crown (the British monarch) retains the right to ownership of all unmarked mute swans in open water, but the King only exercises his ownership on certain stretches of the Thames and its surrounding tributaries. The ownership of swans in the Thames is shared equally among the Crown, the Vintners' Company and the Dyers' Company, who were granted rights of ownership by the Crown in the 15th century.

=== Ghosts ===
According to popular legend, St John's is inhabited by some ghosts. In 1706, four fellows "exorcised" some ghosts from a house opposite the college by threatening to fire their pistols at the positions the moans and groans were coming from. The second court is supposedly haunted by the ghost of the former undergraduate and master, James Wood. Wood was so poor that he could not afford to light his room, and would often do his work in the well-lit stairway.

== Student life ==
The buildings of St John's College include a chapel, a Hall, an old library, a more contemporary "new" library, a bar, a café and common rooms for fellows, graduates and undergraduates. There are also extensive gardens, lawns, a neighbouring sports ground, a College School and a boat house. On-site accommodation is provided for all undergraduate and graduate students. This is generally spacious, and many undergraduate rooms comprise "sets" of living and sleeping rooms, where two students share a suite of two bedrooms, a kitchen and a bathroom. Members of the college can choose to dine either in the Hall, where silver service three-course meals are served six evenings per week or in the buttery, where food can be purchased from a canteen-style buffet.

The college maintains an extensive library, which supplements the university libraries. Most undergraduate supervisions are carried out in the college, though for some specialist subjects undergraduates may be sent to tutors in other colleges.

The college has two official combination rooms for junior members, which represent the interests of students in college and are responsible for the social aspects of college life. Undergraduates are members of the Junior Combination Room (JCR). Graduate students have a membership to the JCR, but also belong to the Samuel Butler Room (SBR), which is the Middle Combination Room (MCR) of St John's College.

The fleet of punts is kept in a purpose-built punt pool behind the Cripps Building. Punt boats are available for use by all members of the college as well as alumni.

St John's tends to be ranked near the middle of the Tompkins Table of undergraduate degree results, with an average position of 12.8 since 1997.

=== Samuel Butler Room Society ===
Entrance to the SBR, I1 First Court

The Samuel Butler Room Society (SBR) is the Middle Combination Room (MCR) of St John's College. The Society traces its foundation to 1960 when graduate student members submitted an application to the College Council for official separation from the Junior Combination Room (JCR). The name of the Society refers to the physical rooms which are used by members of the Society. The rooms were named after the noted Johnian author and polymath Samuel Butler. The membership of the Society comprises all members of the college who are registered graduate students of the college and affiliated students of the college.

=== Sports ===
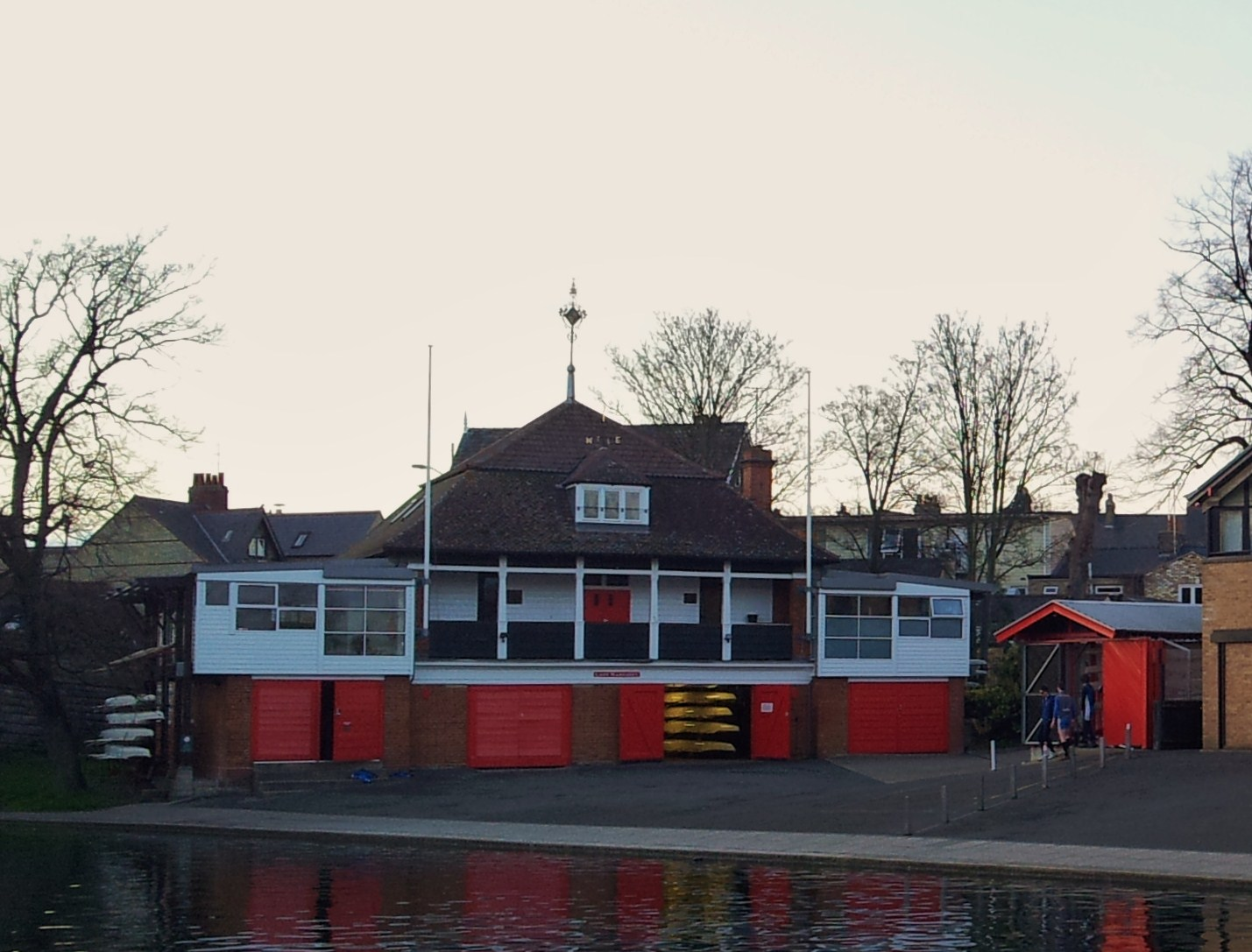
Lady Margaret Boat Club

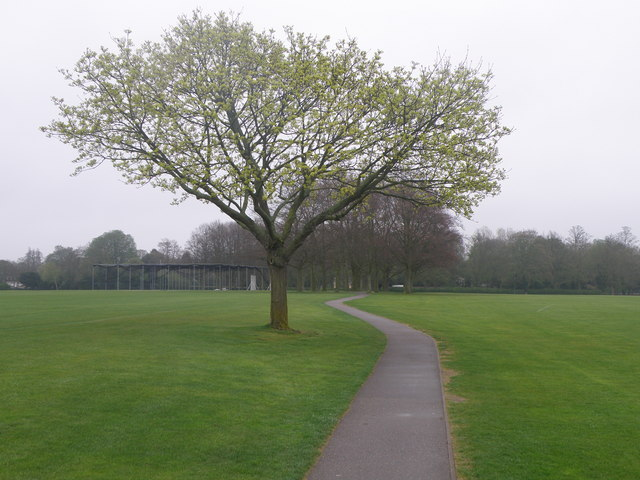
St John's Playing Fields

The college has a sporting history, enjoying success in most of the major sports on offer in Cambridge. The college has a cardio gym and a weights gym on-site and has pristine pitches right behind the college.

The college's hockey club is one of the biggest student sports clubs in the college, with over 50 active members as of 2024. It has had strong success including winning the Division One League title every year from 2019 to 2024. St John's used to be the only Cambridge college to have more than one mixed hockey team, with four teams, although this is enabled due to a fusion with Newnham College, and is no longer true with Jesus College Hockey Club now becoming the first two sport two teams from a single college.

The Red Boys, St John's College Rugby Club, won the Division One League title for nine years in a row, before losing to Jesus in 2010–11, and the Cuppers trophy for six years in a row from 2006 to 2011, making it one of the most successful collegiate sports teams in Cambridge's history. The Redboys occupy 18 out of the 24 plates on the current Division One League Shield and 13 out of the 17 names on the Cuppers trophy. Since 2014, the club has taken home five Cuppers trophies (most recently in 2025, beating St Catherine’s-Homerton), three Division One League Shields, and the inaugural Sevens Shield in 2016–17. In the 2016–17 season, the Redboys went undefeated.

St John's regularly produces a strong contingent of university players but also ensures new players develop and get game time swiftly. The rugby club has produced several notable alumni including former RFU executive Francis Baron from Newcastle Red Bulls, England and Lions fly-half and former RFU Director of Elite Rugby Rob Andrew, and Battlestar Galactica actor Jamie Bamber.

The college rowing club, the Lady Margaret Boat Club (LMBC), is the oldest in the university and was founded in 1825. Despite many rumours concerning the name of the club, it was merely the most successful of the many boat clubs established in the college in the 19th century. Similarly, the traditional rival of the LMBC, the Boat Club of Trinity College, is known as "First and Third" because of its formation from two original clubs.

=== Scholarships and prizes ===
Every year the college awards scholarships to a handful of graduate students under the Benefactors' and Scholarships Scheme. The most generous of all the early benefactors of St John's College was Roger Lupton (died 1540), Provost of Eton and chaplain to Henry VIII. Lupton had amassed immense wealth through a lifetime of royal service and ecclesiastical pluralism and his scholarships exist today as the Lupton and Hebblethwaite Exhibitions. Other scholarships include the Craik Scholarship, the J.C. Hall Scholarship, the Luisa Aldobrandini Studentship Competition, the Paskin Scholarship and the Pelling Scholarship. Competition for these scholarships is very fierce as students from any country reading for any graduate degree—not only members of the college—can apply.

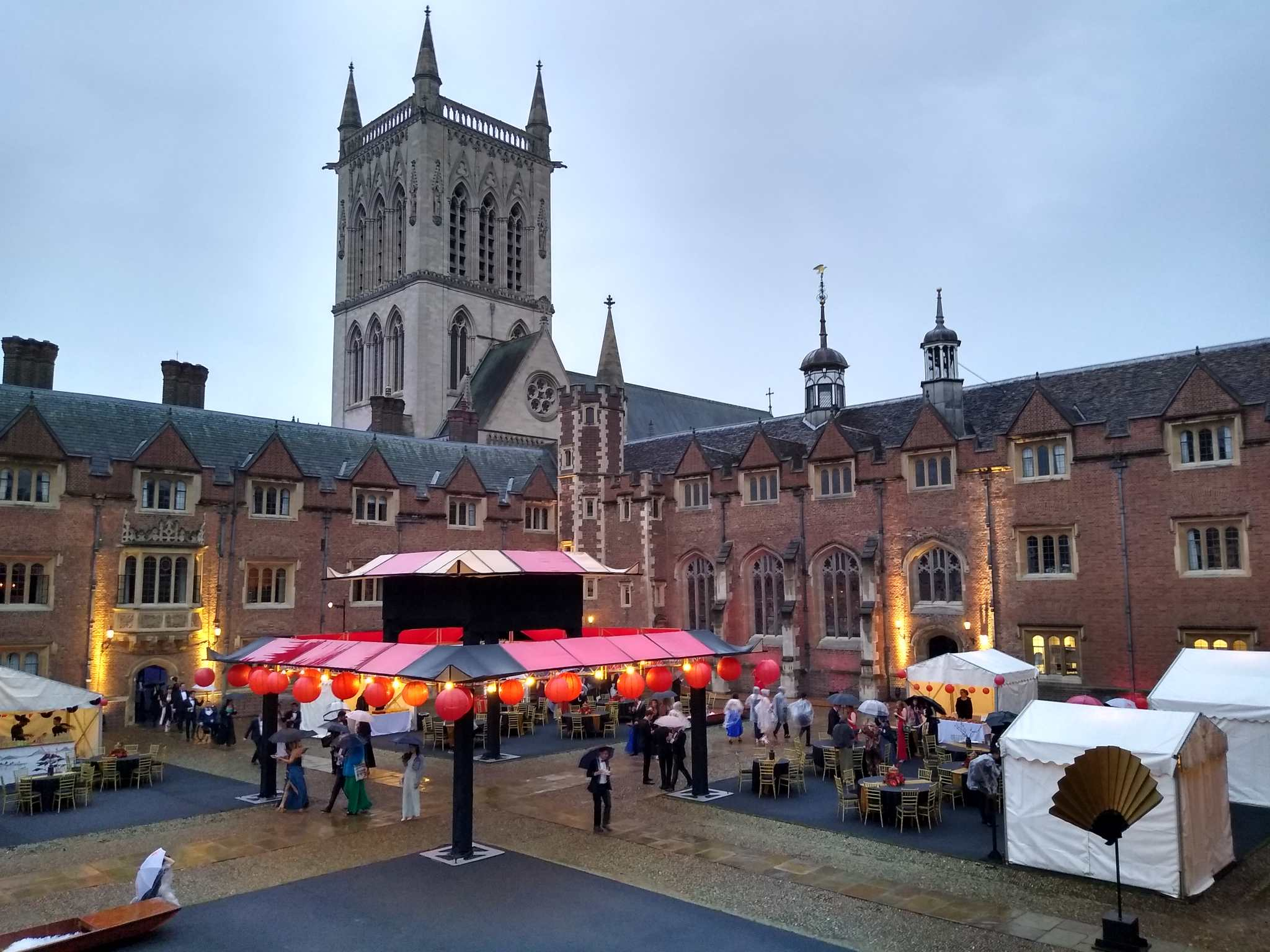
Second Court during the 2019 May Ball

There is also the Adams Prize in mathematics, named after the mathematician (and alumnus of St John's) John Couch Adams for his discovery of Neptune – it is an annual competition and can be awarded to any mathematician resident in the UK, with an age limit of under 40. The college is also associated with the Dr Manmohan Singh Scholarship, first awarded in 2008.

Students at the college wishing to practise law can apply for a McMahon Law Studentship to cover the expense of further study or obtaining professional qualifications.

Every year, students who excel academically and contribute to the life of the college can be nominated for the prestigious Larmor awards. The Awards are named after Sir Joseph Larmor, a former student at St John's. Winners of the prize receive a unique handcrafted piece of silverware and a financial prize. Recent award winners include the actor Jonah Hauer-King and the violinist Julia Hwang.

=== May Ball ===
St John's hosts a large and typically spectacular May Ball, which is traditionally held on the Tuesday of May Week. In recent years, tickets have only been available to Johnians and their guests. Highlights include an extravagant fireworks display and a variety of musical acts which in recent years have included Rudimental, Gorgon City and Katy B. The May Ball is organised by the committee, usually composed of 20 students from the college, with roles ranging from Head of Food, Drink, Security, Scene, Creative, Logistics, Employment, and the executive committee with a President, Vice-President and Junior Treasurer. The Ball prizes itself in being the largest student party in Oxbridge. The first ball took place in 1888 and has since been considered one of the most lavish end-of-year university parties. The theme is kept a secret until the night itself.

== People associated with the college ==
See also Category:Alumni of St John's College, Cambridge, Category:Fellows of St John's College, Cambridge.

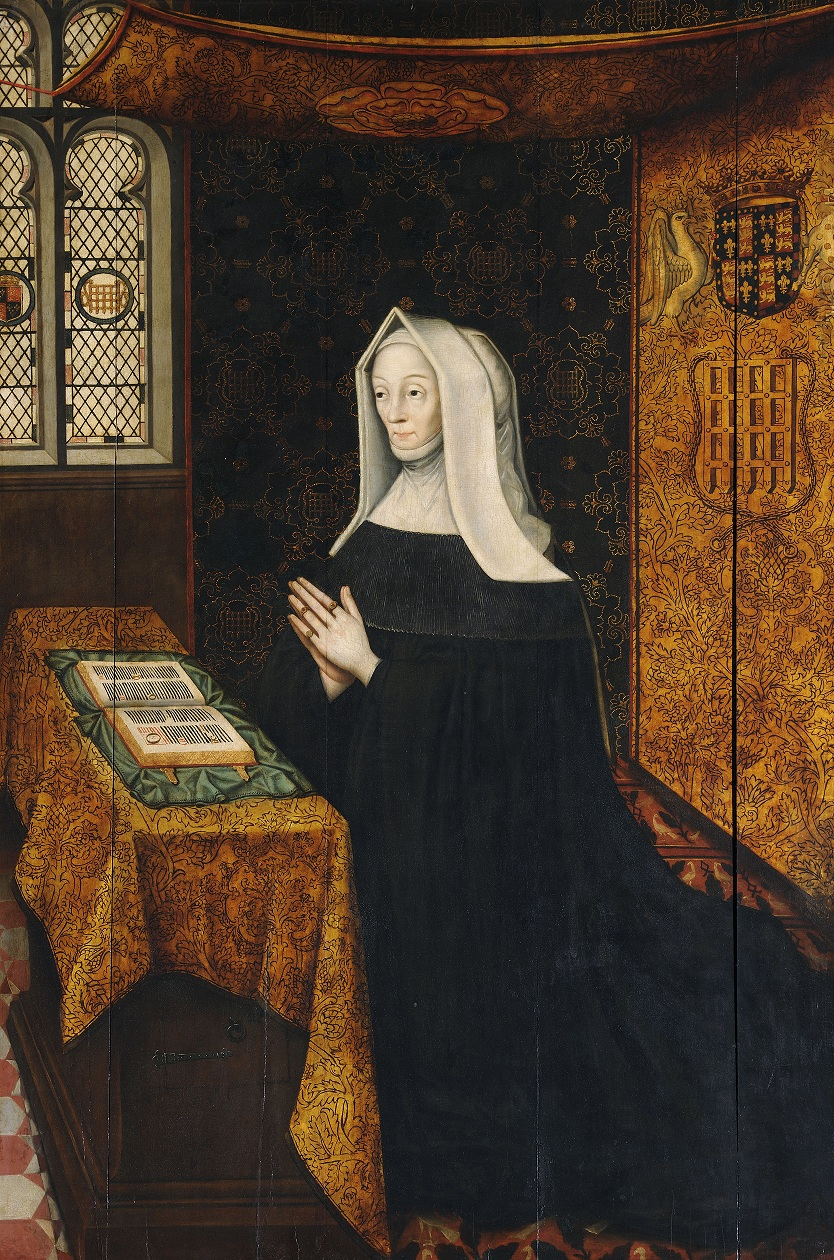
Hall portrait of the foundress Margaret Beaufort, Countess of Richmond and Derby by Rowland Lockey

Notable Johnians include former academics, Nobel laureates, poets, writers, Heads of State and politicians. Over 1000 former members of St John's College appear in the Oxford Dictionary of National Biography.

Prime Ministers: Charles Watson-Wentworth, 2nd Marquess of Rockingham (briefly admitted), Prime Minister of Great Britain, 1765–66 and 1782, F. J. Robinson, 1st Viscount Goderich, Prime Minister of the United Kingdom, 1827–28, George Hamilton-Gordon, 4th Earl of Aberdeen, Prime Minister of the United Kingdom, 1852–55, Henry John Temple, 3rd Viscount Palmerston, Prime Minister of the United Kingdom, 1855–58 & 1859–65, Alfred Domett, Prime Minister of New Zealand, 1862–63, Sir Francis Bell, Prime Minister of New Zealand, 1925, Manmohan Singh, Prime Minister of India, 2004–14.

Nobel Prize winners:

- Paul Dirac, Nobel Prize in Physics 1933, "for the discovery of new productive forms of atomic theory".
- Edward Appleton, Nobel Prize in Physics 1947, "for his investigations of the physics of the upper atmosphere especially for the discovery of the so-called Appleton Layer".
- John Cockcroft, Nobel Prize in Physics 1951, "for their pioneer work on the transmutation of atomic nuclei by artificially accelerated atomic particles".
- Max Born, Nobel Prize in Physics 1954, "for fundamental research in Quantum Mechanics, especially in the statistical interpretation of the wavefunction".
- Frederick Sanger, Nobel Prize in Chemistry 1958, "for his work on the structure of proteins, especially that of insulin".
- Maurice Wilkins, Nobel Prize in Physiology or Medicine 1962, "for their discoveries concerning the molecular structure of nucleic acids and its significance for information transfer in living material".
- Nevill Francis Mott, Nobel Prize in Physics 1977, "for their fundamental theoretical investigations of the electronic structure of magnetic and disordered systems"
- Abdus Salam, Nobel Prize in Physics 1979, "for their contributions to the theory of the unified weak and electromagnetic interaction between elementary particles, including, inter alia, the prediction of the weak neutral current".
- Allan Cormack, Nobel Prize in Physiology or Medicine 1979, "for the development of computer-assisted tomography"
- Frederick Sanger, Nobel Prize in Chemistry 1980, "for their contributions concerning the determination of base sequences in nucleic acids".
- Eric Maskin, Sveriges Riksbank Prize in Economic Sciences in Memory of Alfred Nobel 2007, "for having laid the foundations of mechanism design theory".
- Roger Penrose, Nobel Prize in Physics 2020, "for the discovery that black hole formation is a robust prediction of the general theory of relativity".

Copley Medallists: John Frederick William Herschel (1821), John Frederick William Herschel (1847), John Couch Adams (1848), James Joseph Sylvester (1880), George Howard Darwin (1911), Joseph Larmor (1921), Charles Algernon Parsons (1928), Arthur Schuster (1931), Paul Adrien Maurice Dirac (1952), Harold Jeffreys (1960), Nevill Francis Mott (1972), William Valance Douglas Hodge (1974), Frederick Sanger (1977), Rudolf Ernst Peierls (1986), Abdus Salam (1990), Roger Penrose (2008), David Roxbee Cox (2010)

Notable Johnians

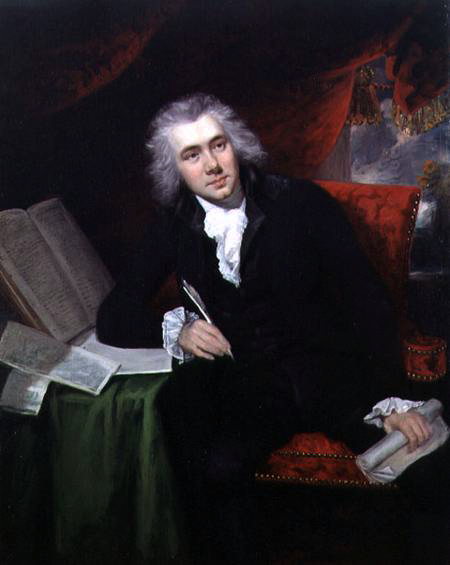
William Wilberforce

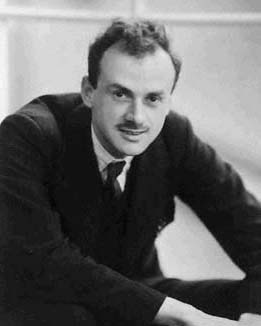
Paul Dirac

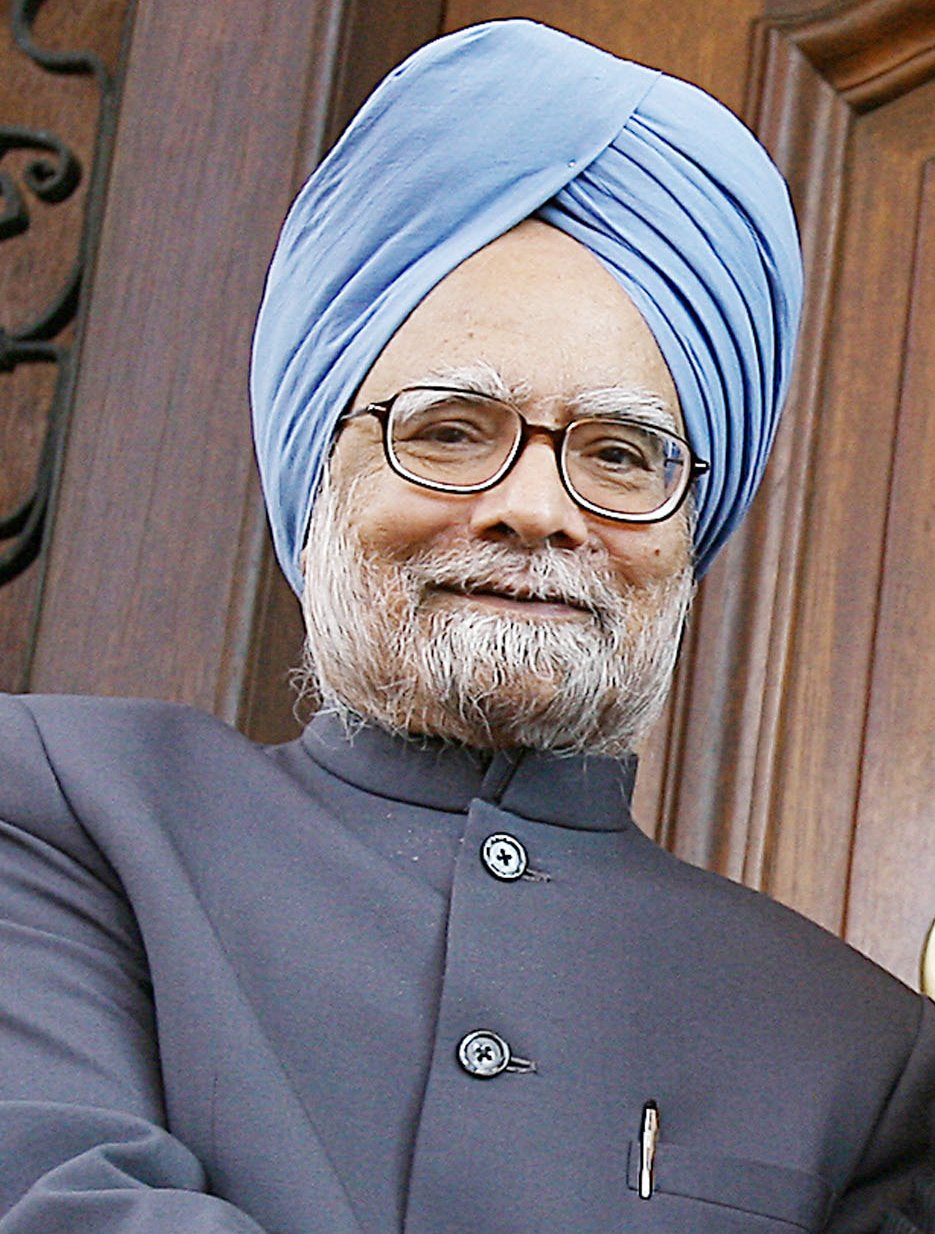
Manmohan Singh

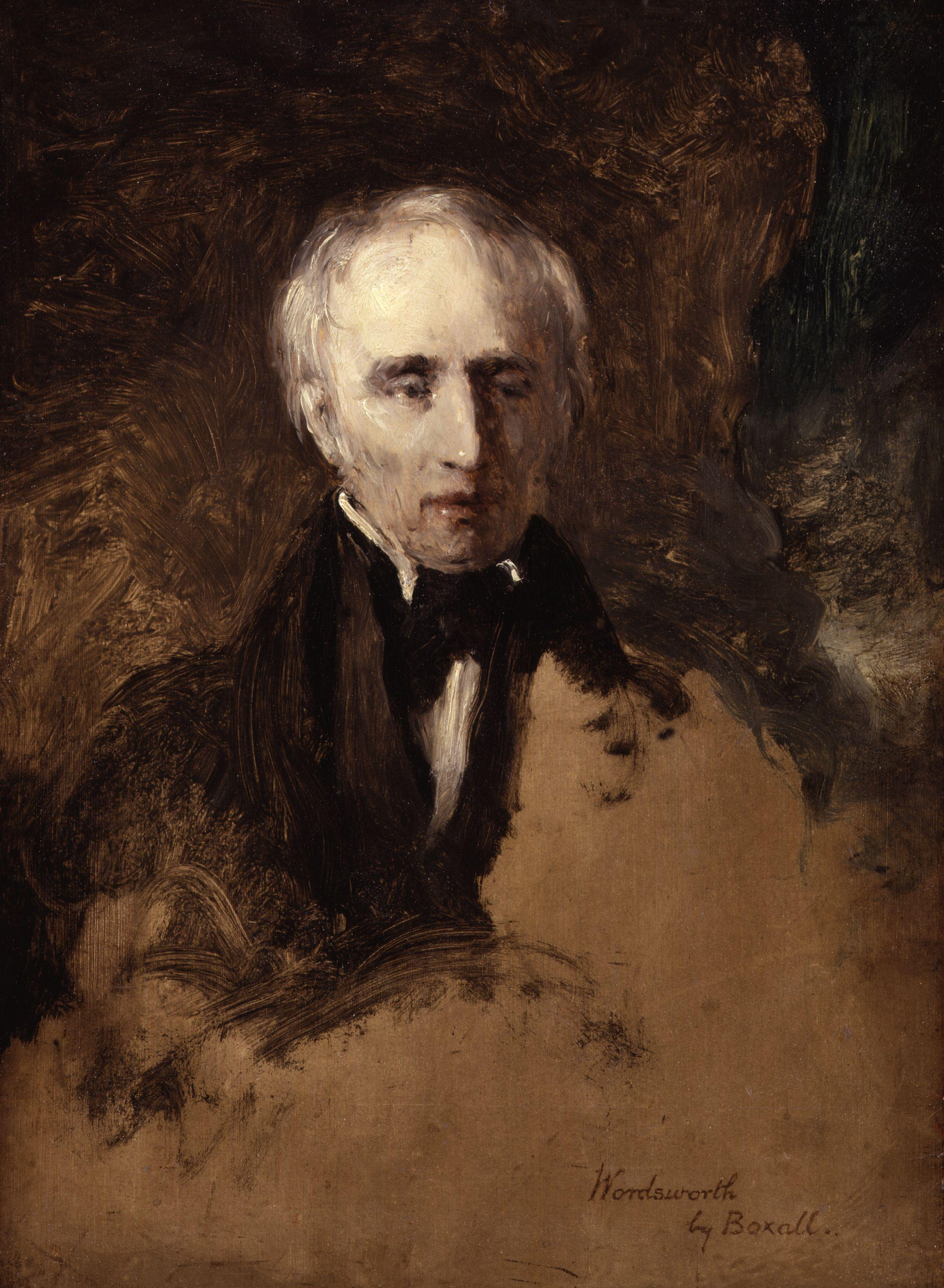
William Wordsworth

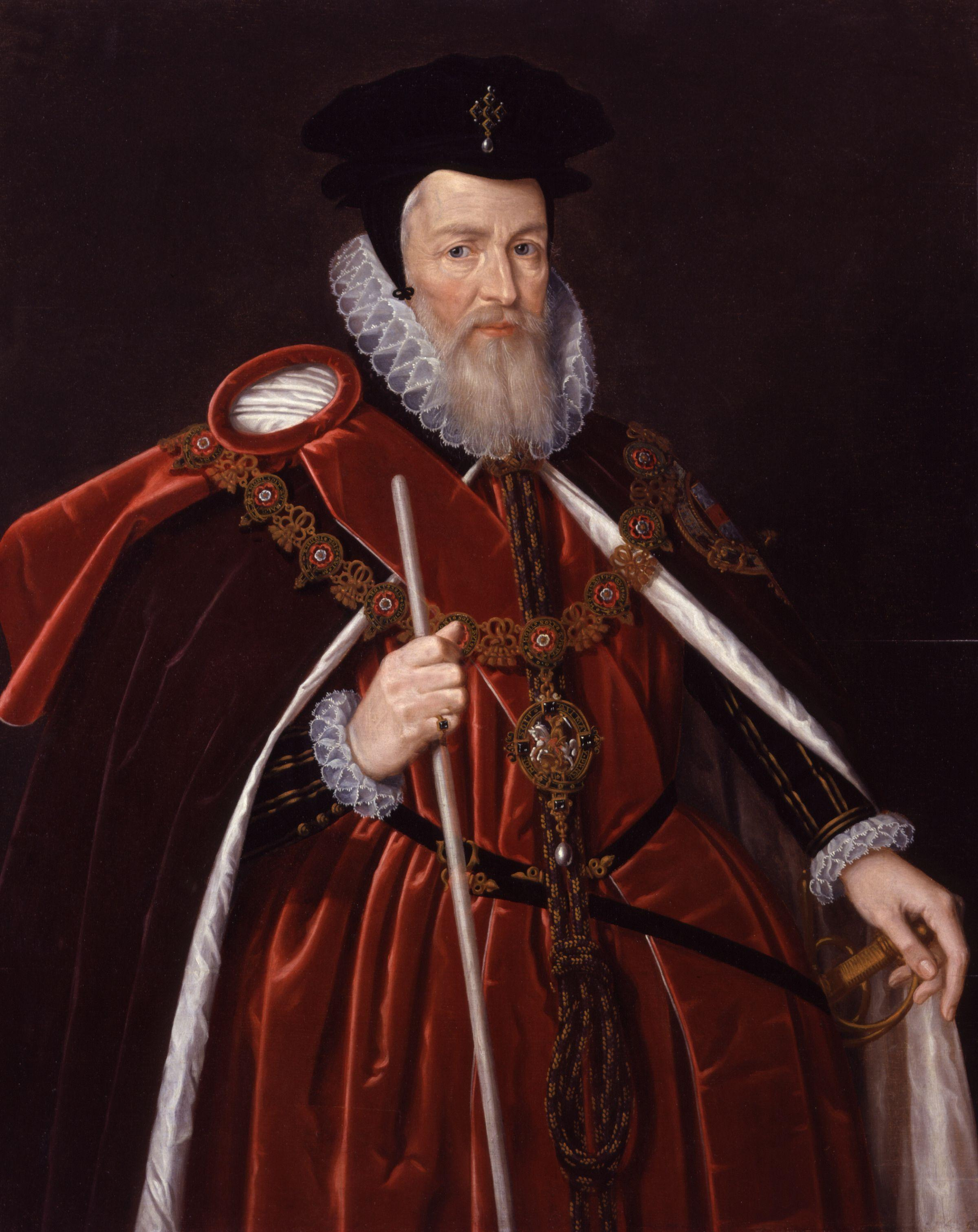
Lord Burghley

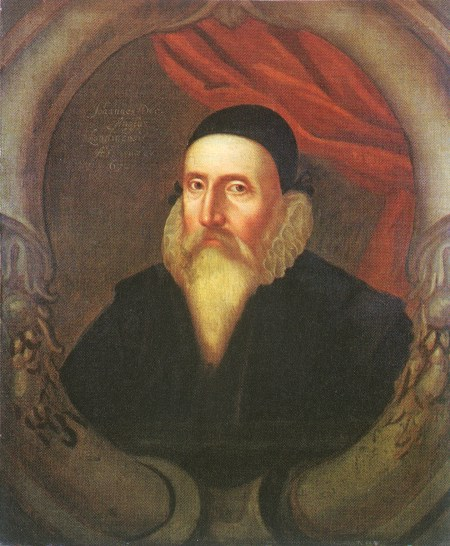
John Dee

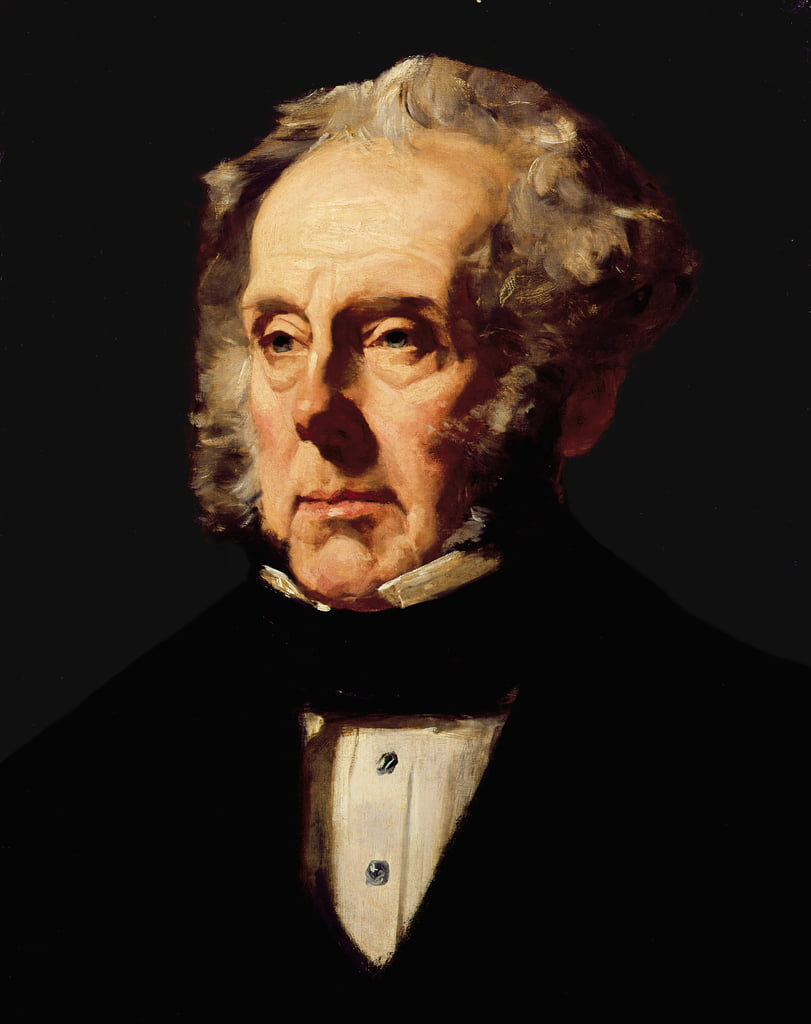
Lord Palmerston

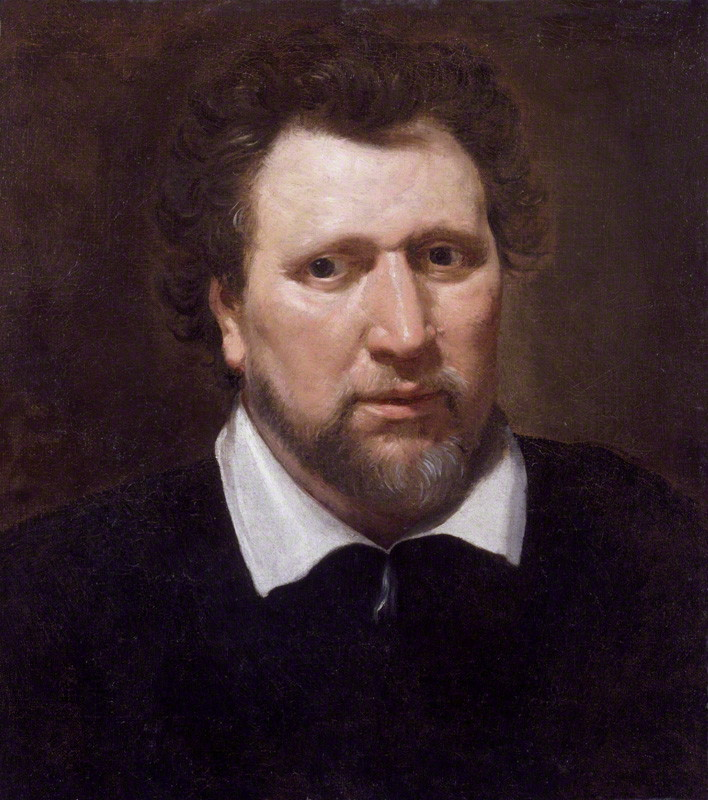
Ben Jonson

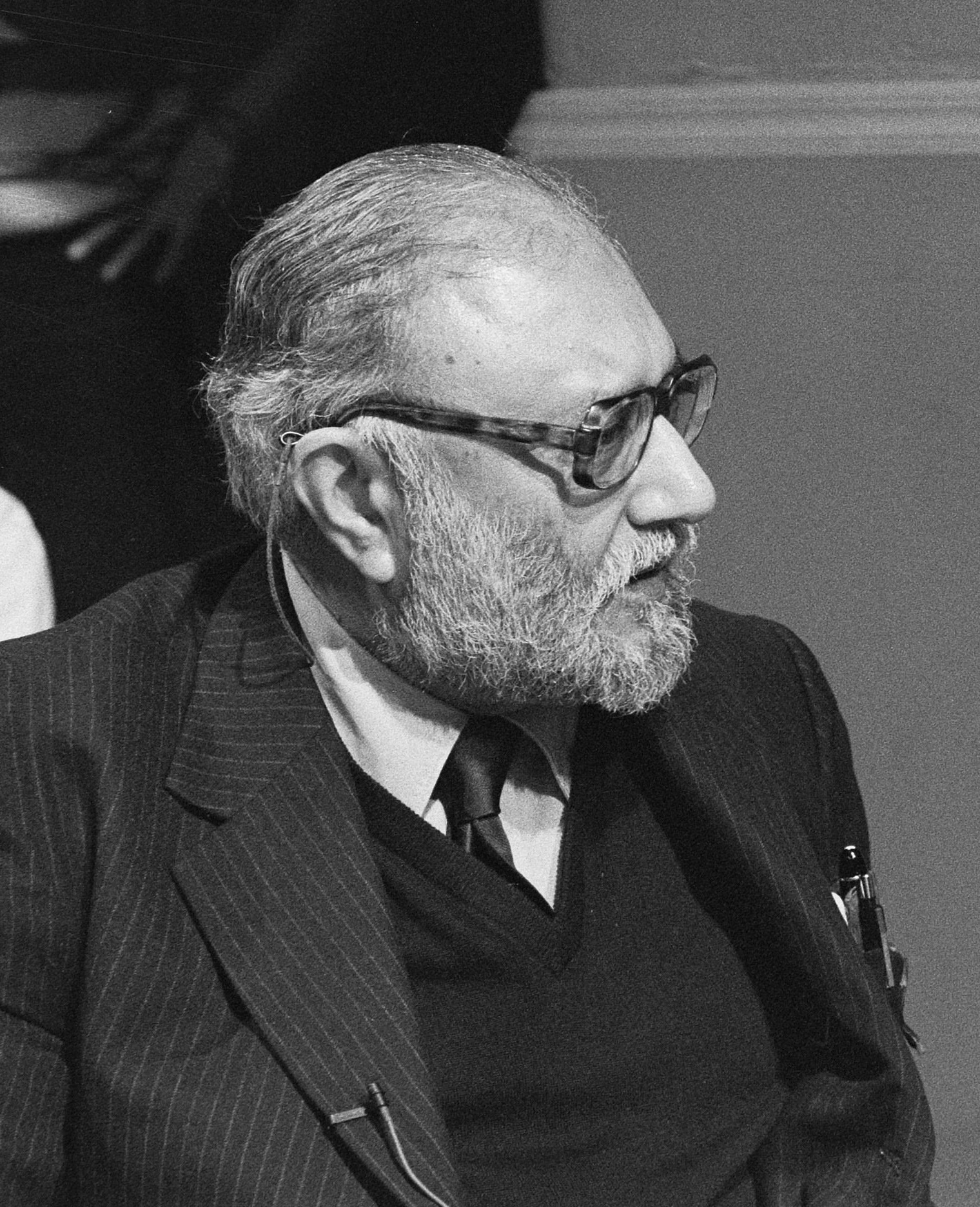
Abdus Salam

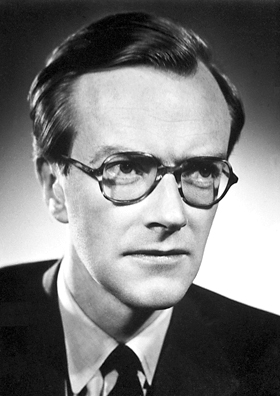
Maurice Wilkins

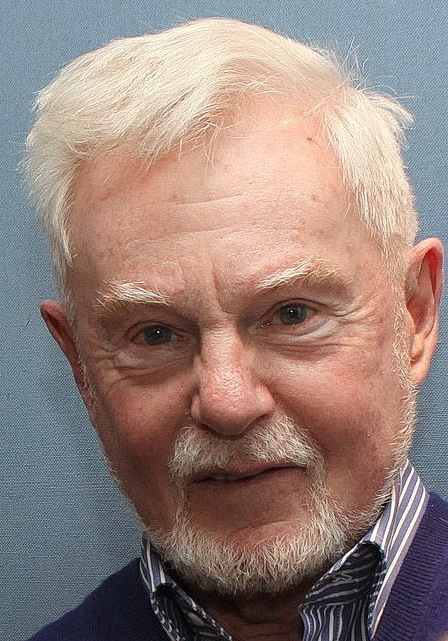
Derek Jacobi

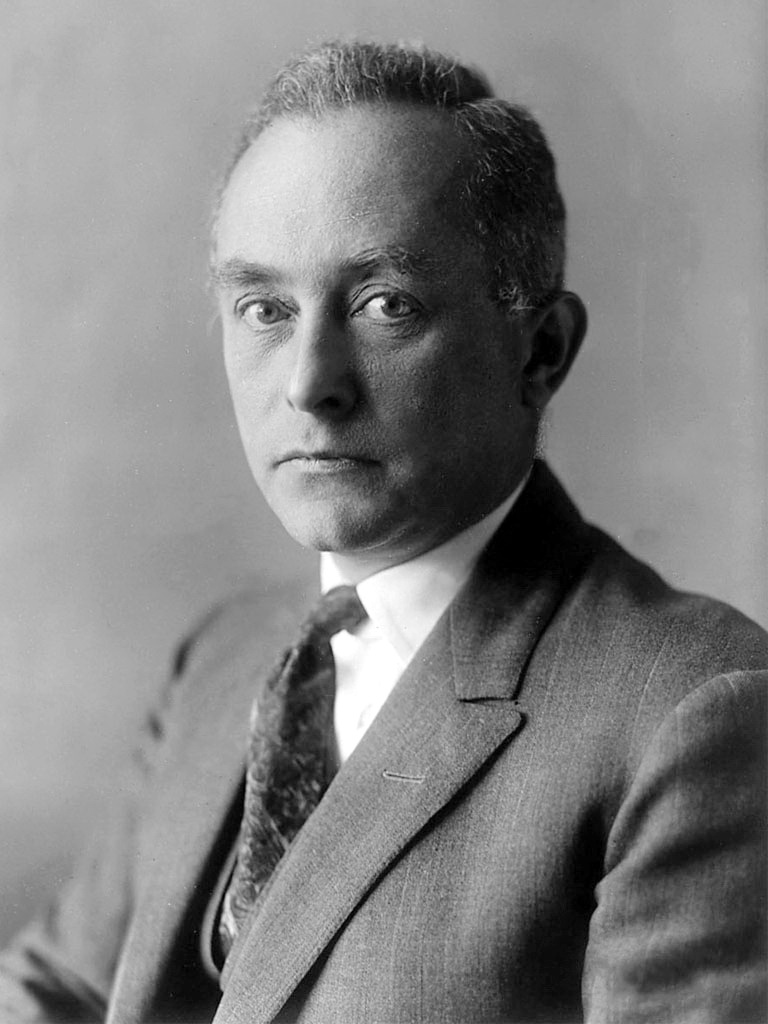
Max Born

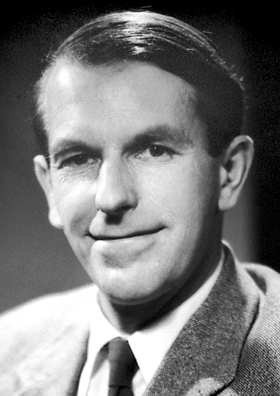
Frederick Sanger

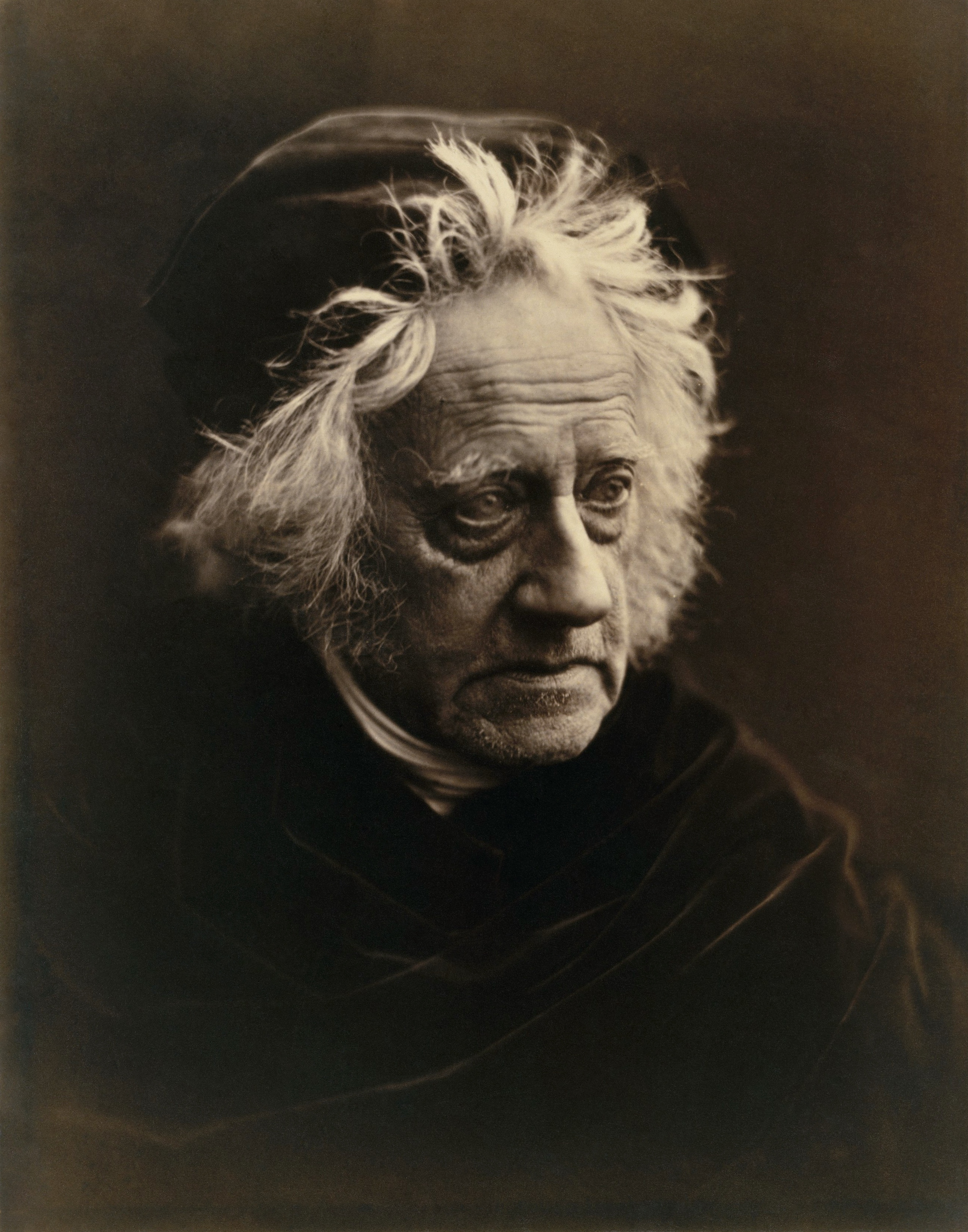
John Herschel

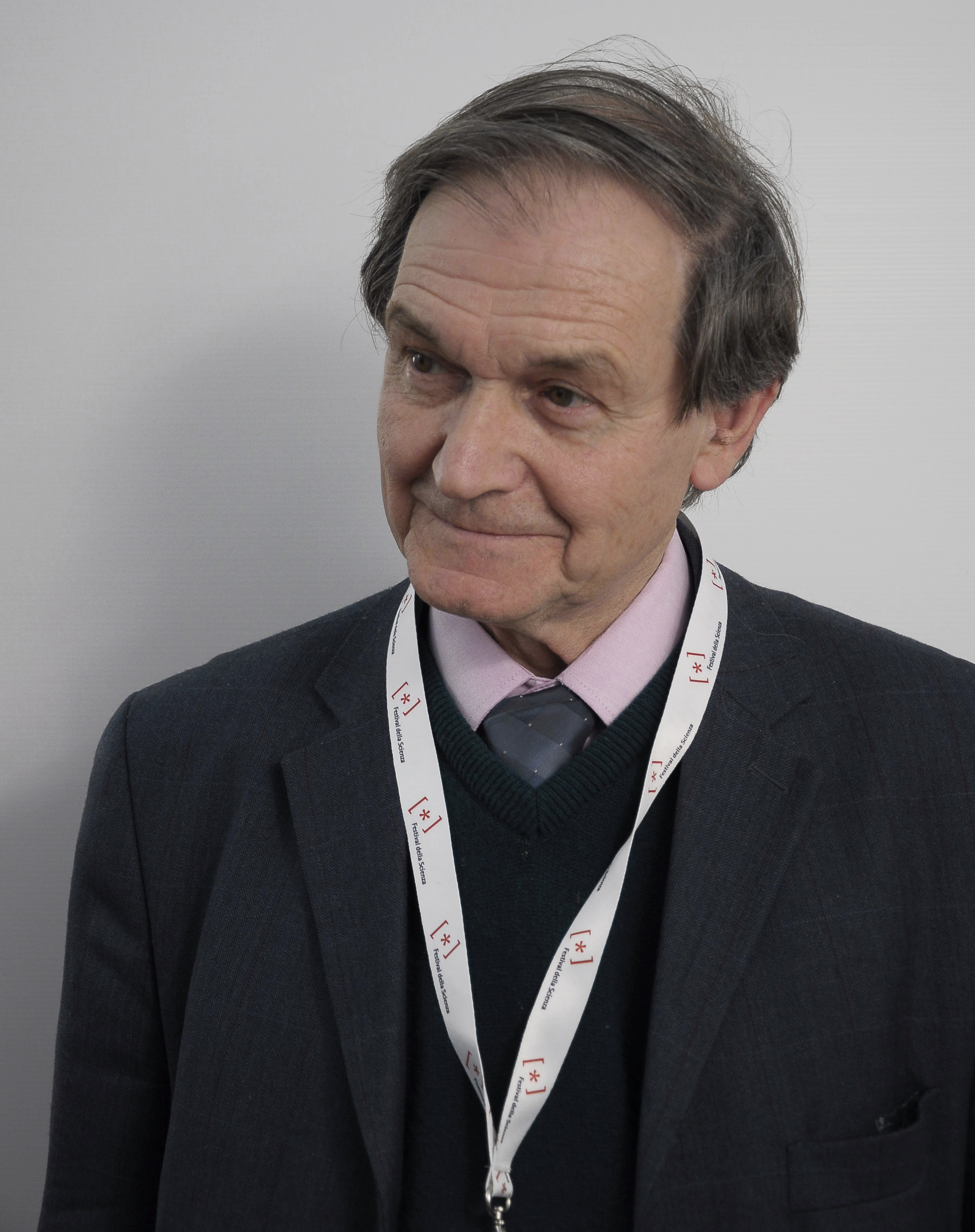
Roger Penrose

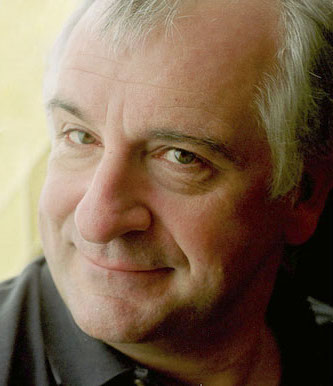
Douglas Adams

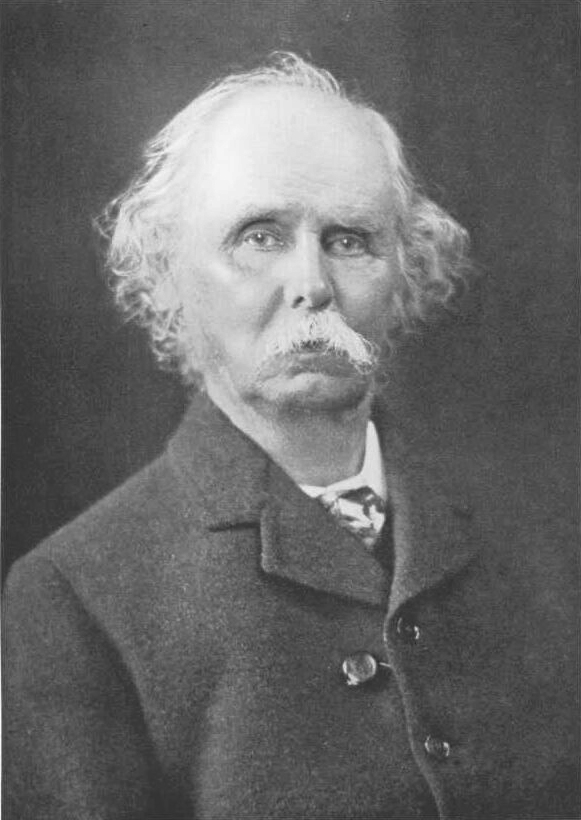
Alfred Marshall

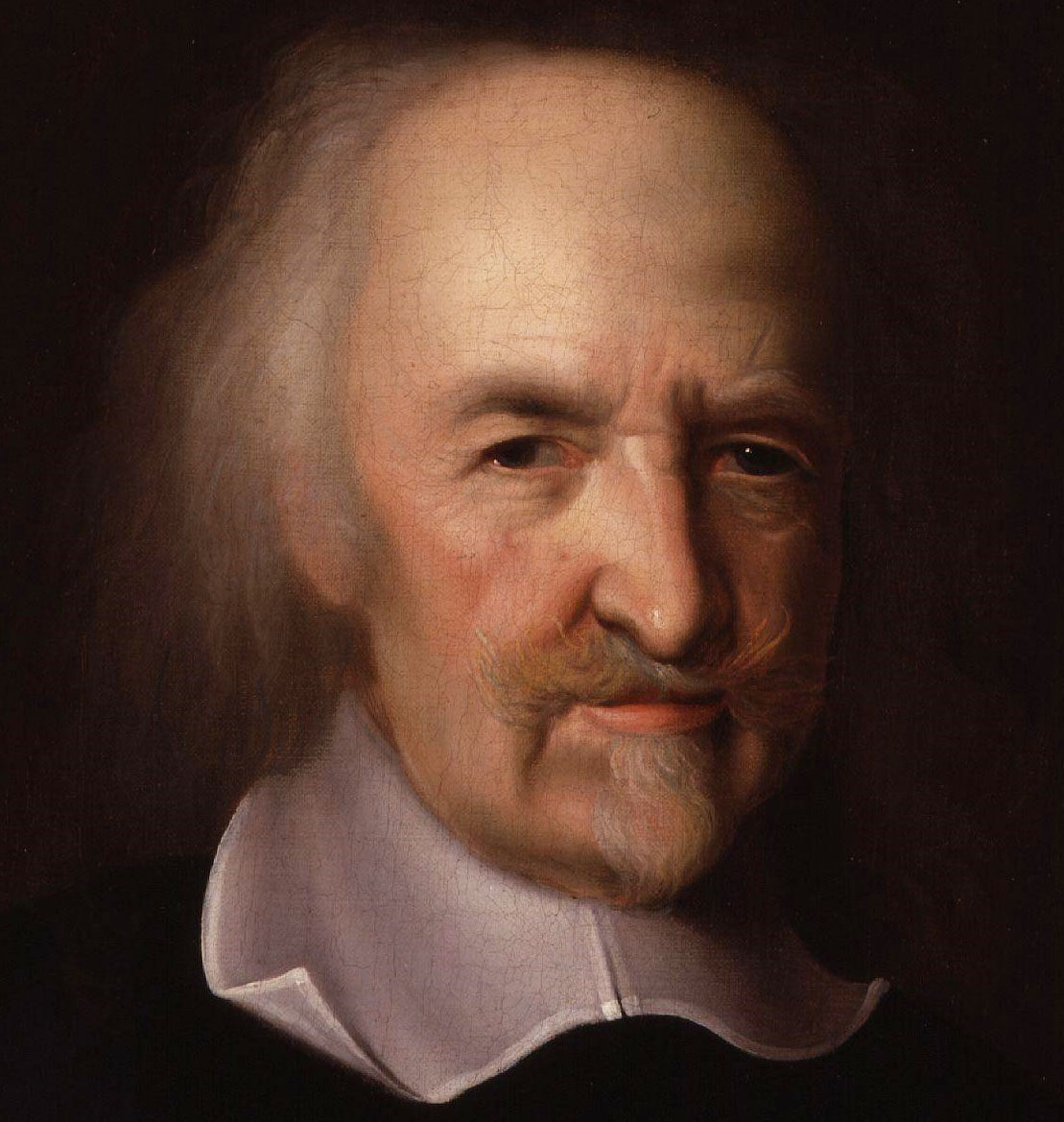
Thomas Hobbes

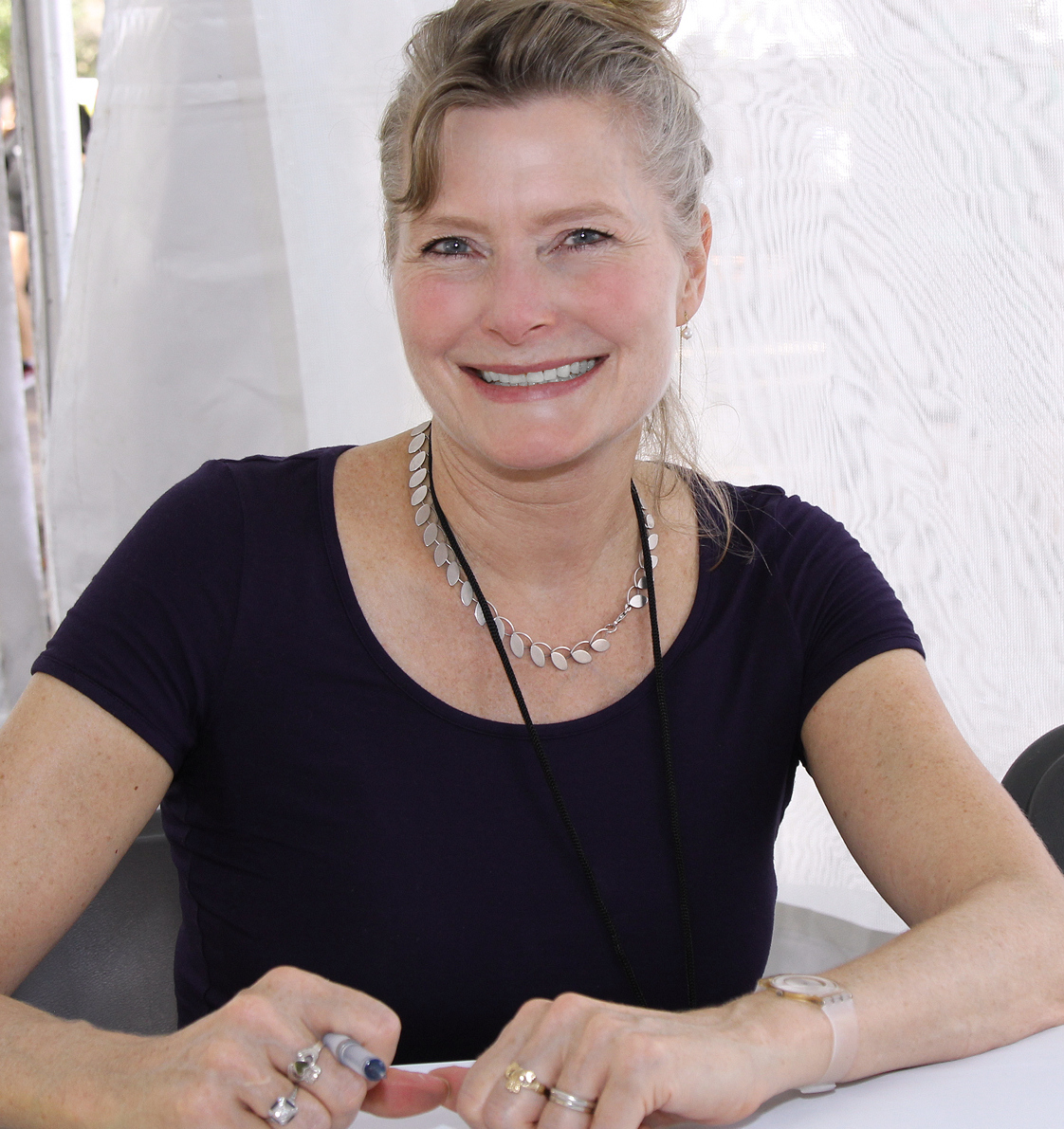
Jennifer Egan

=== St John's and the abolition of the British slave trade ===
St John's alumnus Thomas Clarkson addresses delegates at the 1840 convention of the British and Foreign Anti-Slavery Society

Several of St John's graduates were involved in the efforts to abolish the British Slave Trade that culminated in the Slave Trade Act 1807. In particular, Thomas Clarkson, William Wilberforce, Thomas Gisborne and Thomas Babington were active in the Committee for the Abolition of the Slave Trade and other abolitionist efforts.

As part of the commemoration of the bicentenary of the 1807 Act, and as a representative of one of the Ivy League universities offering an American historical perspective on the Triangular Trade, President Ruth J. Simmons of Brown University (herself a descendant of American slaves) gave a public lecture at St John's College entitled "Hidden in Plain Sight: Slavery and Justice in Rhode Island" on 16 February 2007. St John's College hosted some of the events relating to the commemoration, including an academic conference and a Gospel Mass in the College Chapel with the London Adventist Chorale.

== See also ==
- Cambridge University Moral Sciences Club
