= St John's Voices =

Choir at St John's College, Cambridge, England

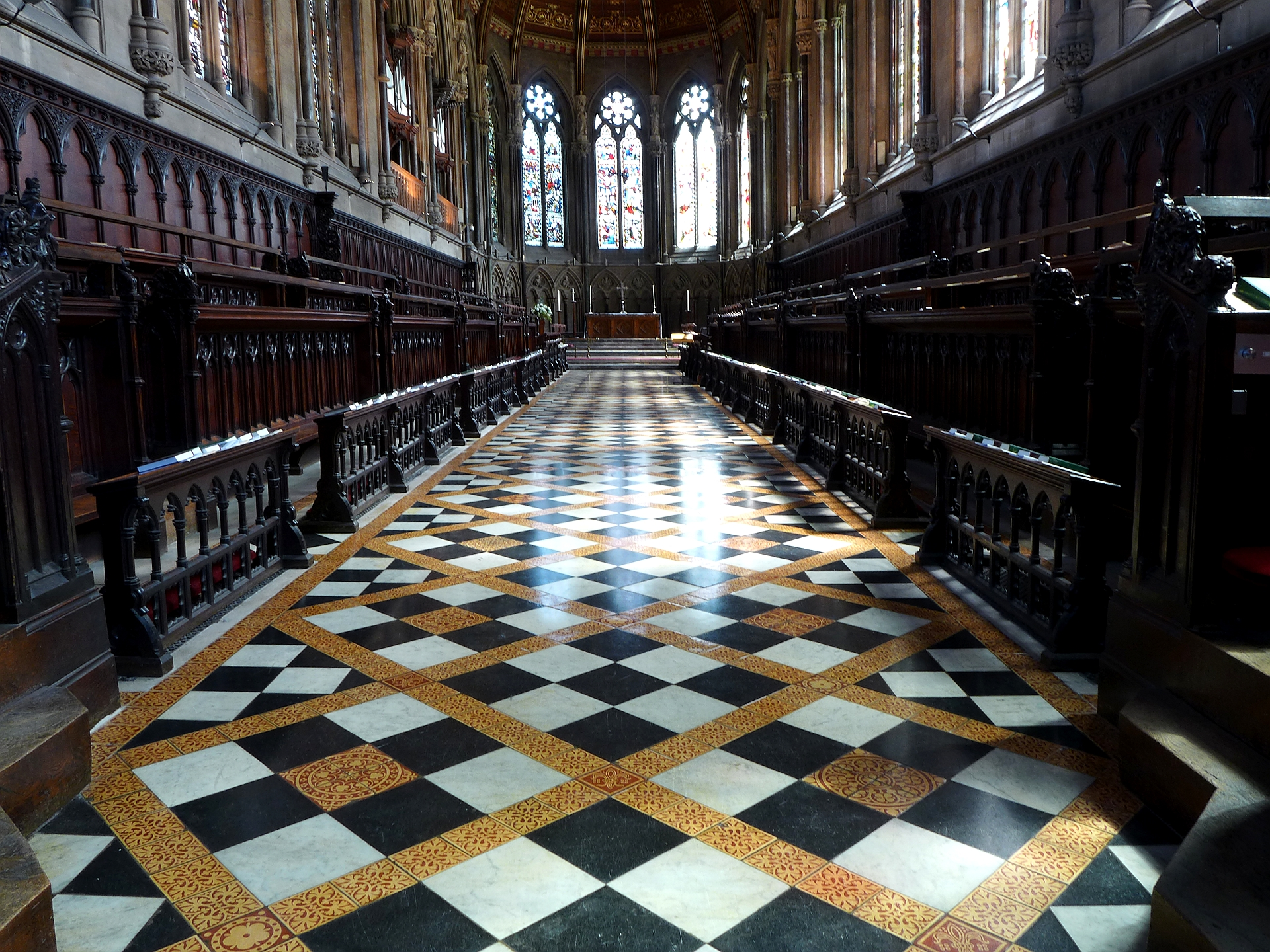
St John's College Chapel

St John's Voices was the secondary choir of St John's College, Cambridge, alongside the College choir of St John's. Founded in 2013 to allow female members of the college to take part in the college's choral tradition, it was a mixed voice adult choir, comprising around 30 singers. As well as singing Choral Evensong in the College chapel, St John's voices gave frequent concerts, and toured internationally. The choir's outreach extended to Austria, Switzerland, Ireland, Hong Kong, and Singapore. The choir has also produced critically acclaimed recordings under the Naxos label, of works by William Mathias and Pavel Chesnokov.

== Reactions to disbandment ==
In March 2024, the choir received written notice from the college that St John's Voices would be disbanded by June 2024. They stated that the decision was made "to adopt a broader approach to the provision of co-curricular opportunities in music for our students, including in different genres". This decision caused widespread controversy, due to the reduction of opportunities for female singers. Despite the fact that St John's College choir has admitted women since 2022, it does not include soprano voices.

Members of St John's Voices initiated a campaign against the disbandment, condemning the decision as "regressive" in an open letter which received over 14,000 signatures. They stated that the admission of female singers into the Choir of St John's College had been "weaponised against the very existence of another ensemble, supposedly in the name of broadening opportunities". The open letter received national media attention from The Guardian, The Daily Telegraph and The Independent, with notable supporters including Rowan Williams, Simon Rattle, Sarah Connolly, Gareth Malone, Alexander Armstrong, Anna Lapwood, and John Rutter.

In response to the protest, the college released a statement saying that the move was made to "redirect the significant resources currently devoted to St John's Voices", highlighting that the choir has recently expanded to include members from other colleges.

In October 2024, the Cambridge University Schola Cantorum was announced as the reconstituted ensemble of the former St. John's Voices.
