= Edward Welbourne =

Edward Welbourne (23 March 1894 – 28 January 1966) was the Master of Emmanuel College, Cambridge, from 1951 to 1964.

== Early life ==
Welbourne's early education began at a country school, De Aston School in Market Rasen, Lincolnshire, which he later described as 'incredibly incompetent' but with a teacher who was able to inspire a lifelong love of learning. He entered Emmanuel College in 1912, performed exceptionally well in history and participated in the rowing team. He served in the Durham Light Infantry in France during World War I, where he was injured and received the Military Cross for having carried out 'a number of dangerous reconnaissance missions under heavy fire and leading a raid with great courage and skill'.

After his return from the war, Welbourne's economic history dissertation won a trio of prestigious awards including the Thirlwall and Gladstone prizes. He became a fellow, tutor and then senior tutor at Emmanuel College, assuming the position of Master in 1951.

== Later life ==
Welbourne, once a tutor to Punjabi Muslim nationalist Rahmat Ali, personally arranged Ali's burial in Cambridge on 20 February 1951 after his death in the UK. The funeral expenses and other medical expenses were repaid by the High Commissioner for Pakistan in November 1953, after what was described as 'protracted correspondence' between the London office and relevant authorities in Pakistan.

Academic offices
Preceded by Thomas Shirley Hele	Master of Emmanuel College, Cambridge; 1951-1964	Succeeded by Gordon Sutherland
