= William Chawner =

British academic (1848–1911)

William Chawner (born February 1848 at Macclesfield, Cheshire, died 29 March 1911, at Vence, Alpes Maritimes) was an educational reformer and the first layman to be appointed as Master of Emmanuel College, Cambridge.

== Life ==
The son of William Chawner, vicar of Crich from 1855 to 1875, Chawner was educated at Rossall School before matriculating in 1867 at Emmanuel College and graduating as a prizeman in classics in 1871.

Other than a brief period as Assistant Master at Winchester College in 1874, Chawner's life was dedicated to Emmanuel where he became a Fellow in 1871, tutor from 1875 10 1890 and master from 1895 until his death in 1911. During his tutorship, the college embarked on a period of remarkable growth; as master he was largely instrumental in establishing a scheme of Exhibitions for students preparing for work in elementary schools, in connection with the Day Training College.

A paper, Prove All Things, written by Chawner and read by him to a religious discussion society at Emmanuel in 1909, led to the formation of the Heretics Society.

Chawner served as Vice-Chancellor of the University of Cambridge from 1899 to 1901.

Academic offices
Preceded by Samuel George Phear	Master of Emmanuel College, Cambridge; 1895-1911	Succeeded by Peter Giles
Preceded by Alexander Hill	Vice-Chancellor of the University of Cambridge; 1899-1901	Succeeded by Adolphus William Ward
