= Richard Holdsworth =

English academic theologian

Richard Holdsworth (or Houldsworth, Oldsworth) (1590, in Newcastle upon Tyne – 22 August 1649) was an English academic theologian, and Master of Emmanuel College, Cambridge from 1637 to 1643. Although Emmanuel was a Puritan stronghold, Holdsworth, who in religion agreed, in the political sphere resisted Parliamentary interference, and showed Royalist sympathies.

== Early life ==
Richard Holdsworth was the youngest son of Richard Holdswourth (died 1596), vicar of St Nicholas, Newcastle, and was baptised there on 20 December 1590. His mother's maiden name was Pearson, and he was brought up by his uncle William Pearson, in holy orders. He entered St. John's College, Cambridge as a scholar in 1607, graduated B.A. in 1610, and became a Fellow in 1613.

Holdsworth was chaplain to Sir Henry Hobart, 1st Baronet. Hobart had built Blickling Hall in Norfolk; but he took an interest in Beverley in Yorkshire, as a possible seat in the House of Commons for his son John. John Hobart, an undergraduate at Pembroke College, Cambridge from 1608, was later elected as Member of Parliament for Cambridge in 1621. Sir Henry Hobart, then at the end of his life, presented Holdsworth to a Yorkshire living; Holdsworth shortly exchanged it for a City of London living, and was rector of St Peter-le-Poor in 1624.

In 1629 Holdsworth was the first Gresham College divinity lecturer appointed from the Puritan camp; he held the position until 1637. His "moderate Calvinist" views allowed for a respectful mention of Richard Hooker, but on church polity he laid more emphasis on Richard Field. According to Quantin, the lectures on the Church Fathers "may be considered a recapitulation of Protestant patristics."

In 1633, on the death of Owen Gwyn, Holdsworth was a strong candidate to succeed him as Master of St John's College. He was opposed by the vice-master Robert Lane, who had support from senior Fellows. King Charles I intervened, and appointed William Beale, a protégé of William Laud. By way of compensation, Holdsworth was made Archdeacon of Huntingdon and a canon of Lincoln Cathedral. In reaction to Laudianism and its ceremonial reforms, Sharpe commented that Laud "delights in gentleness" when it came to enforcement. As Archdeacon, Holdsworth enforced the reforms.

== Master of Emmanuel College ==
On the death of William Sancroft the Elder in 1637, Holdsworth was elected Master of Emmanuel College. William Sancroft, the nephew of the late Master and future archbishop, graduated B.A. that year; with Ezekiel Wright, shortly to leave for the living of Dennington, he had studied a broad syllabus. He continued to an M.A. in 1641, became a Fellow in 1642, and was a tutor.

Under Holdsworth, Emmanuel College was popular, having the highest number of matriculations in the University in the academic year 1641-2. If traditionally a Puritan college, it was a liberal intellectual environment. "Emmanuel, indeed, produced all the chief Cambridge Platonists except More." Holdsworth provided John Wallis, who graduated B.A. at Emmanuel as he arrived, with an introduction to the mathematician William Oughtred. Wallis's tutors had been Anthony Burges, Thomas Horton and Benjamin Whichcote. Wallis was blocked from an immediate fellowship by a technical issue with the statutes, but was allowed to stay at Emmanuel as an M.A. candidate, studying mathematics as an autodidact, to 1640.

Anthony Sparrow, a graduate of Queens' College, Cambridge, and Sylvester Adams, a graduate of Merton College, Oxford, preached contentious sermons in Cambridge over the summer of 1637 on the topic of auricular confession. Holdsworth in his role as head of house joined with Ralph Brownrigg, the vice-chancellor, Richard Love of Corpus Christi College and Samuel Ward of Sidney Sussex College to discipline Adams. The issue was, however, divisive. In particular Benjamin Lany of Pembroke College, supported by Laud in his election as Master, demurred from condemning as popish Adams's claim that confession to a priest was necessary to salvation; he argued that confession should not be discouraged. At the end of the year, when Adams had made a recantation, the heads of houses had not reached a consensus. Holdsworth accepted the recantation, with the qualification that he "liketh a longer time be giuen [sic] to the consideration of it." Sparrow, protected by the Laudian establishment and having emphasised instead free will, printed his sermons without detriment, and is considered now to have represented a widely-held attitude towards Catholic doctrine in Cambridge at that period.

His London reputation brought Holdsworth the presidency of Sion College in 1639. Holdsworth's appointment at Gresham College ran to 1641, but he may earlier have ceased lecturing. According to John Ward, Holdsworth's successor at Gresham College was elected in 1641 from two candidates, Horton and Whichcote; Horton was successful.

On 21 January 1641, the King summoned Holdsworth, with Archbishop James Ussher and Ralph Brownrigg, to discussions on church reform, on the basis of a "reduced episcopacy". In the climate of the impeachment of Archbishop Laud, these three churchmen of Calvinist views were among those who had become more prominent. Holdsworth contributed to Ussher's "reduction" draft, with suggested amendments. In March of that year both Brownrigg and Holdsworth were appointed royal chaplains. Holdsworth preached a sermon in the Church of St Mary the Great, Cambridge on 27 March 1642 for the King.

He was a member of the Westminster Assembly. He was Vice-Chancellor of the University of Cambridge, for two years, and Lady Margaret's Professor of Divinity, from 1643.

== Later life ==
In the Parliamentary visitation of the University of Cambridge, Holdsworth lost his position as Master of Emmanuel College. He was arrested in May 1643 on the grounds that as vice-chancellor he had allowed royal proclamations to be printed on the University press. He was imprisoned for a period by Parliament.

He was appointed Dean of Worcester by the King, in 1647. It is also claimed that the King wanted to appoint him Bishop of Bristol; this is mentioned by Thomas Fuller. Given the wartime conditions, these appointments could have been taken up only with difficulty.

Richard Holdsworth died at his home in Broad Street, London. He was unmarried.

== Educational views ==
Holdsworth is said to have been a moderniser in education, in the line of Francis Bacon and Comenius, and a proponent of unadorned prose. His students at St. John's included Simonds D'Ewes. D'Ewes left an account of 18 months of reading with Holdsworth: the Dialectica logic text of John Seton; the logics of Bartholomäus Keckermann and Pierre Du Moulin; ethics in the Attic Nights of Aulus Gellius and Alessandro Piccolomini; physics in Johannes Magirus and history in Florus.

=== Directions for a Student in the Universitie ===
The Directions for a Student in the Universitie has generally been attributed to Holdsworth. The attribution is questioned by Hill as not certain. Patrick Collinson wrote that the Directions "while preserved at Emmanuel, doubtless record Holdsworth's practice at St John's." Trentman in discussing the Cambridge and Oxford manuscripts of the Directions concluded that the Cambridge MS., while certainly not written by Holdsworth, has the traditional provenance from Joshua Barnes attributing it to Holdsworth; and the Oxford manuscript is a derived work in the nature of a copy of a copy.

This work is a scheme of a four-year classical education. Its emphasis on college teaching and rhetoric, and general reading in English, had a major influence at Cambridge going forward in the 17th century. For rhetoric, Holdsworth recommended recent texts by Nicolas Caussin and Famiano Strada. Arthur West Haddan, writing a Life of Herbert Thorndike, commented that Holdsworth's views confirm "the great preponderance still maintained by classical and by Aristotelian subjects." By the fourth year, the morning studies were to be the Naturales quaestiones, Aristotle and theology in Marcus Friedrich Wendelin. These, according to Costello, were to produce an acquaintance with the "thought and method" of scholasticism.

Samuel Eliot Morison in his history of Harvard College gave details of "Holdsworth's Programme for the B.A." For logic, Holdsworth recommended the Institutionum logicarum by Franco Burgersdijk.

Holdsworth instructed by means of a system of note-taking, saying of Burgersdijk's logic "as you read it you must gather some short notes out of it". He gave detailed comments on the use of a commonplace book. For controversies, he recommends the logic of Edward Brerewood, Eustache Asseline, the Conimbricenses and the Collecteana Complutense (presumably the Collectanea moralis philosophiae of Luis de Granada). In relation to the authors' views of disputed points for a given question, he asked "gather the sum and substance of it into your Paper-book."

== Works ==
- The Valley of Vision, or a Clear Sight of Sundry Sacred Truths (1651), introduction by Thomas Fuller, published by the bookseller Richard Littlebury. Fuller later argued that just one of the 21 sermons included, the 1642 sermon given in Great St. Mary's, was authentic. The provenance of the others was shorthand notes.
- Praelectiones Theologicae (1661), Gresham College lectures

== Legacy ==
Holdsworth was a bibliophile; John Pory wrote to Thomas Puckering in 1631 about Holdsworth hearing the confession of the dying Sir Robert Cotton of the Cotton library. He amassed a private collection of 10,000 books. He bequeathed it, under some conditions, to Emmanuel College, or Trinity College, Dublin. After a long legal limbo caused by the political and testamentary conditions it was given to Cambridge University Library, which in the meantime needed to return Lambeth Library which it had acquired under the Commonwealth. The legal process was completed by the end of 1664. Holdsworth's library is said to have been the largest private collection of the time in England, if John Selden's was of higher quality.

== Notes ==
Academic offices
Preceded by Samuel Brooke	Gresham Professor of Divinity; 1629–1637	Succeeded by Thomas Horton
Preceded by William Sancroft the Elder	Master of Emmanuel College, Cambridge; 1637–1644	Succeeded by Thomas Hill
