= Peter Giles (philologist) =

British philologist (1860–1935)

Portrait by Walter Stoneman, 1918

Peter Giles (20 October 1860 – 17 September 1935) was a Scottish philologist and Master of Emmanuel College, Cambridge.

== Life ==
Peter Giles was born at Strichen, Aberdeenshire, on 20 October 1860 and, after graduating from the University of Aberdeen, went up to Cambridge University as a scholar of Gonville and Caius College in 1882. He was placed in the first class in both parts of the Classical Tripos and in the second class in history.

After attending the lectures of Karl Brugmann at Freiburg and Leipzig, Giles brought the ideas of the Neo-grammarians to England in his only publication, A Short Manual of Comparative Philology for Classical Students, published in 1895 and subsequently translated into German.

Giles succeeded John Peile as the Reader in comparative philology at Cambridge in 1891, a position he retained until his death.

Giles served as the Master of Emmanuel College, Cambridge from 1910 until 1935 and as Vice-Chancellor from 1919 to 1920. He died in Cambridge, aged 74.

Academic offices
Preceded by William Chawner	Master of Emmanuel College, Cambridge; 1911-1935	Succeeded by Thomas Shirley Hele
Preceded by Arthur Shipley	Vice-Chancellor of the University of Cambridge; 1919-1920	Succeeded by Edmund Courtenay Pearce
