= Gordon Sutherland =

Scottish physicist (1907–1980)

Sir Gordon Sutherland FRS
- Born: Gordon Brims Black McIvor Sutherland; 8 April 1907; Watten, Highland, Scotland
- Died: 27 June 1980 (aged 73); Little Shelford, Cambridgeshire, England
- Resting place: Church of All Saints, Little Shelford
- Education: Morgan Academy
- Alma mater: University of St Andrews
- Spouse: Gunborg Elisabeth Wahlström
- Children: Ann Birgitta; Kerstin E Mary Seaton
- Scientific career
- Institutions: Trinity College, Cambridge; University of Michigan; Pembroke College, Cambridge; National Physical Laboratory; Emmanuel College, Cambridge

6th Director of NPL
- In office 1956–1964
- Preceded by: Reginald Leslie Smith-Rose (Acting)
- Succeeded by: John Vernon Dunworth

Sir Gordon Brims Black McIvor Sutherland FRS (8 April 1907 – 27 June 1980) was a Scottish physicist.

== Biography ==
Sutherland was born on 8 April 1907 at Watten, Caithness. He was the youngest of seven children of Peter Sutherland and Eliza Hope (née Morrison), both teachers. He was taught by his parents until he was ten, when he attended Leven Academy for a year before moving to Morgan Academy in Dundee for 6 years. From there he went to the University of St Andrews where he took the unusual route of studying for a double degree: an MA in mathematics and applied mathematics, and a BSc in physics. This involved a 5-year combination of courses that had not been taken before. He graduated in 1928 and 1929 with first-class honours in each.

Sutherland’s first research work was at Trinity College, Cambridge under Ralph H. Fowler, but after a year he concluded that he did not have the mathematical ability to be a good theoretical physicist, so he switched to experimental work on Raman spectra with Martin Lowry and C. P. Snow. During this time he met, and was much impressed by, David M. Dennison who was on sabbatical from the University of Michigan. He successfully applied for a Commonwealth Fund Fellowship, and so sailed from Liverpool on the MV Britannic in September 1931, en route to Ann Arbor. He worked in Dennison’s group for two academic years on a detailed infrared study of NO_{2} and N_{2}O_{4} together with Raman studies on N_{2}O_{4} and ozone.

Having gained a Carnegie Fellowship, Sutherland was able to return to Cambridge, this time to Lennard-Jones’s group where he worked with W G Penney on trying to understand the reasons for the very weak Raman spectra of hydrazine and hydrogen peroxide. This was resolved, as was that for the ozone spectrum.

Sutherland then successfully applied for the Stokes Studentship tenable at Pembroke College, and was elected to a Staff Fellowship the following year. He soon built up a group of very able researchers, including Gordon K T Conn and Mansel Davies.

From 1939 Sutherland was engaged in war work. This initially involved locating and disabling unexploded bombs, and later the use of infrared spectroscopy to help in the analysis of the petrol being used by the Germans in their fighters and bombers. He found that iso-octane component of the fuel had a highly characteristic set of bands which was evident even in complex mixtures. This analysis, which could be automated to make the detection in minutes, was valuable in the choice of targets for Bomber Command.

He was elected a Fellow of the Royal Society in 1949, the year in which he was also asked if he would like to return to UMich as a full professor. After much thought, especially about what he would be leaving behind, he took up the offer. It took a considerable time to build the group he wanted, but he was able to develop his interest in the biochemical and biophysical applications of infrared spectroscopy.

Sutherland returned to Britain as Director of the National Physical Laboratory (NPL). He and his family sailed on the SS United States, arriving at Southampton from New York on 24 July 1956. During his period at the NPL he successfully obtained additional staff and facilities for the Laboratory, to make up for the relative lack of investment since the war. He appointed John Pople to head up a new basics physics division, who was joined by David Whiffen, Keith McLauchlan, and Ray Freeman who together developed the use of nuclear magnetic resonance.

Sutherland was knighted in 1960 and returned to Cambridge in 1964 as Master of Emmanuel. He retired in 1977. He was a member of both the American Academy of Arts and Sciences and the American Philosophical Society.

=== Family ===
Sutherland met his future wife, Gunborg Elisabeth Wahlström from Sweden, in Cambridge in 1933. She was staying with the family of Reginald Revans, whom Sutherland had met in the physics department at UMich. Gordon and Gunborg were engaged in 1935. She left Sweden for England again on 12 February 1936, and they married that year at Caxton Hall in London.

The Sutherlands had three daughters:

Ann Birgitta (1937), who attended the Courtauld Institute of Art, graduating with first class honours in 1961. She gained her PhD from the Courtauld in 1965, and that same year married William Harris. They moved to New York, where Ann Sutherland Harris joined the Department of Art and Archaeology at Columbia University as an assistant professor. She later divorced and moved to Pittsburgh where she became Mellon Professor of Art History. She has one son, Neil Harris, who is married to Kelly Shimoda. They have two children and live in Berkeley, California.

Jane Elizabeth Kerstin (1940), who graduated from St Andrew’s University in 1962, gaining a first class honours BSc in Physiology, married Thomas Stempel in New Haven CT in 1964. They moved to San Diego, and later to Los Angeles. Kerstin had a 34-year career with three different research laboratories at UCLA. She was also an accomplished singer. Kerstin died in 2018 after a long illness. Their daughter, Audrey Stempel, is married to Daniel Elroi. They have two grown-up children and live in Palos Verdes, Los Angeles.

Mary Seaton (1943), was principal flute in the National Youth Orchestra, and now plays jazz flute and saxophone in the South London Jazz Orchestra. She married Richard Macnutt in 1964 and was administrator for his antiquarian music business in Tunbridge Wells until their divorce in 1974. Richard died in 2024. Mary has held various part-time administrative roles in London, most recently with the Blackheath Preservation Trust Ltd. In 2020 Mary and her new partner David Quarmby became Civil Partners and bought a historic house in Greenwich, which they have renovated. Mary has two grown-up children by her former husband. They are both married, both have two grown-up children and live in Tunbridge Wells and Winchester.

Sir Gordon Brims Black McIvor Sutherland died on 27 June 1980 at Little Shelford, Cambridgeshire.

=== Other posts held ===
- Member of Royal Society delegation to mainland China (1962)
- Vice-President of the Royal Society (1962–63)
- Served on the Council for Scientific Policy (1965-1967)
- The U.K. representative on a committee of the International Council of Scientific Unions (1965)
- President of the Institute of Physics (1964-1966)
- Honorary Vice-President of the International Organization for Pure and Applied Biophysics
- Member of the National Gallery’s Board of Trustees (1971-1978)
- Trustee of Wolfson College, Cambridge for 11 years, then elected Honorary Fellow in 1977
- Trustee of Rothamsted Experimental Station (1979-1980)

Academic offices
Preceded by Edward Welbourne	Master of Emmanuel College, Cambridge; 1964-1977	Succeeded by Derek Brewer
