= Parlement of Foules =

Poem by Geoffrey Chaucer

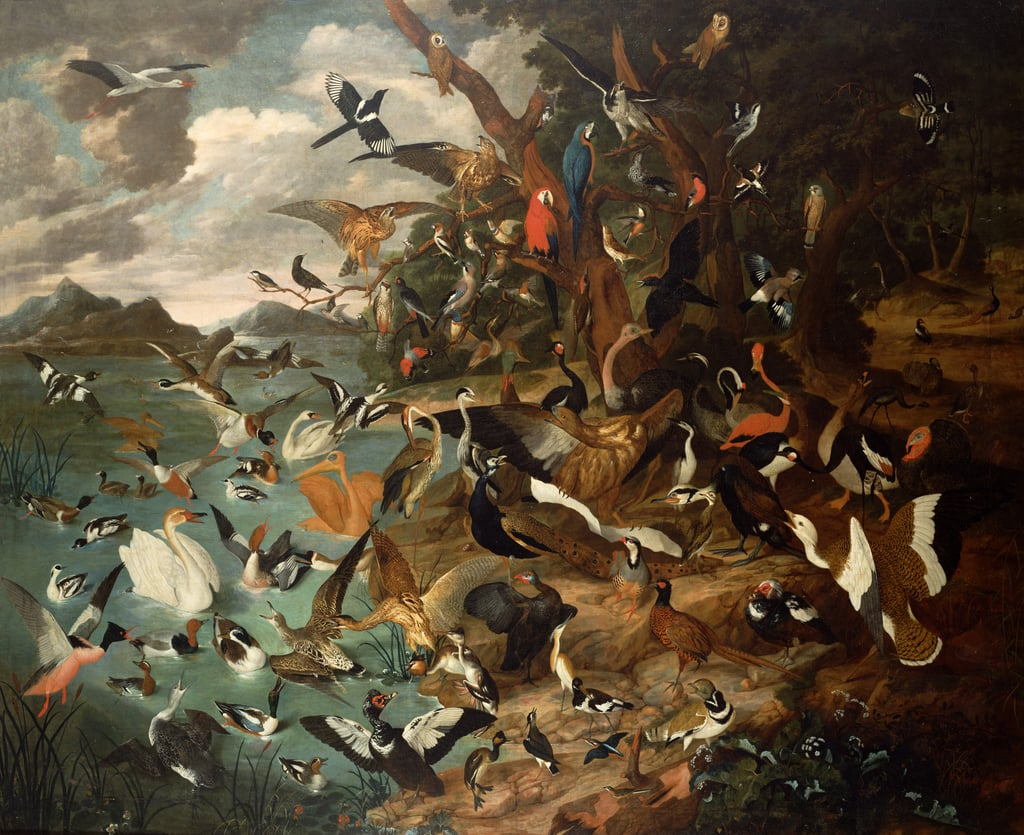
The Parliament of Birds, an 18th-century oil painting by Karl Wilhelm de Hamilton

The Parlement of Foules (modernized: Parliament of Fowls), also called the Parlement of Briddes (Parliament of Birds) or the Assemble of Foules (Assembly of Fowls), is a poem by Geoffrey Chaucer (c. 1340s–1400) made up of approximately 700 lines. The poem, which is in the form of a dream vision in rhyme royal stanza, contains one of the earliest references to the idea that St. Valentine's Day is a special day for lovers.

Oruch's survey of the literature finds no association between Valentine and romance prior to Chaucer. He concludes that Chaucer is likely to be "the original mythmaker in this instance."

== Summary ==
The poem begins with the narrator reading Cicero’s Somnium Scipionis in the hope of learning some "certeyn thing". When he falls asleep, Scipio Africanus the Elder appears and guides him up through the celestial spheres to a gate promising both a "welle of grace" and a stream that "ledeth to the sorweful were / Ther as a fissh in prison is al drye" (reminiscent of the famous grimly inscribed gates in Dante's Inferno). After some deliberation at the gate, the narrator enters and passes through Venus’s dark temple with its friezes of doomed lovers and out into the bright sunlight. Here Nature is convening a parliament at which the birds will all choose their mates. The three tercel (male) eagles make their case for the hand of a formel (female) eagle until the birds of the lower estates begin to protest and launch into a comic parliamentary debate, which Nature herself finally ends. None of the tercels wins the formel, for at her request Nature allows her to put off her decision for another year (indeed, female birds of prey often become sexually mature at one year of age, males only at two years). Nature, as the ruling figure, in allowing the formel the right to choose not to choose, is acknowledging the importance of free will, which is ultimately the foundation of a key theme in the poem, that of common profit. Nature allows the other birds, however, to pair off. The dream ends with a song welcoming the new spring. The dreamer awakes, still unsatisfied, and returns to his books, hoping still to learn the thing for which he seeks.

== Manuscripts ==

The first page of verse from the Parlement of Foules in Bodleian Fairfax 16 (f.120r)

There are fifteen manuscript sources for the poem:

- British Library, Harley 7333
- Cambridge University Library Gg. IV.27
- Cambridge University Library Ff. I.6 (Findern)
- Cambridge University Library Hh.IV.12 (incomplete)
- Pepys 2006, Magdalene College, Cambridge
- Trinity College, Cambridge R.3.19
- Bodleian Library, Arch. Selden B.24
- Bodleian Library, Laud Misc. 416
- Bodleian Library, Fairfax 16 (fols. 120r–129v; c.1450)
- Bodleian Library, Bodley 638
- Bodleian Library, Tanner 346
- Bodleian Library, Digby 181
- St. John's College, Oxford, J LVII
- Longleat 258, Longleat House, Warminster, Wiltshire

William Caxton's early print of 1478 is also considered authoritative, for it reproduces the text of a manuscript now considered lost. The stemma and genealogy of these authorities was studied by John Koch in 1881, and later established by Eleanor Prescott Hammond (1866–1933) in 1902, dividing them into two main groups, A and B (last five MSS), although the stemma is by no means definitive.

Concerning the author of the poem, there is no doubt that it was written by Geoffrey Chaucer, for so he tells us twice in his works.

- The first time is in the Introduction (Prologue) to The Legend of Good Women: "He made the book that hight the Hous of Fame, / And eke the Deeth of Blaunche the Duchesse, / And the Parlement of Foules, as I gesse".
- The second allusion is found in the Retraction to The Canterbury Tales: "the book of the Duchesse; the book of Seint Valentynes day of the Parlement of Briddes".

A more difficult question is that of date. Early criticism of the poem, as far as the first decades of the 20th century, relied mainly on the different interpretations of the text—comparing the fight for the female eagle with royal betrothals of the age—to produce a date of composition for the poem. Fred N. Robinson (Complete Works of Geoffrey Chaucer, 1957: 791) mentioned that "if the theories of allegory in the Parliament are rejected, the principal evidence usually relied on for dating the poem about 1381-2 disappears". Later criticism, however, is much more objective on the reasons why the poem has been dated in 1382, the main reason given in lines 117–118 of the poem itself: "As wisly as I sawe the [Venus], northe northe west / When I begane my sweuene for to write" for according to John M. Manly (1913: 279–90) Venus is never strictly in the position "north-north-west...but it can be easily thought to be so when it reaches its extreme northern point". Manly adds that this condition was met in May 1374, 1382, and 1390.

The third date is easily discarded since we know that the poem is already mentioned as composed in the Prologue to The Legend of Good Women. Derek Brewer (1960: 104) then argues that the date of 1382, as opposed to that of 1374, is much more likely for the composition of the poem since, during the same period (1373–85), Chaucer wrote many other works including The House of Fame which, in all respects, seems to have been composed earlier than The Parliament of Fowls, thus: "a very reasonable, if not certain, date for the Parlement is that it was begun in May 1382, and was ready for St. Valentine's Day, 14th February 1383" (Brewer, 1960: 104). Although much of the criticism on the interpretation of The Parliament of Foules— which would render clues for its date of composition—is contradictory, and criticism about the importance of line 117 does not agree on whether it can be taken as serious evidence for the dating of the poem, there is nowadays a general agreement among scholars as to 1381–1382 being the date of composition for The Parliament of Foules.

There is no evidence Chaucer was influenced by Aṭṭār’s The Conference of the Birds.

== Artistic representations ==
- The Parliament of Fowls (2008) is a one-act comic opera by American composer John Craton

== Translations and editions ==
- Parlement of foules (1914). Translation, with an introduction, notes and glossary, by Charles Maxwell Drennan (1870–1935).
- Parlement of foules. In The complete works of Geoffrey Chaucer (1937), pp. 101–110. Edited from numerous manuscripts by the Rev. Walter William Skeat (1835–1912).

== See also ==
- The Conference of the Birds
- Language of the birds
- Panentheism
