= Derek Brewer =

Welsh scholar

- Born: Derek Stanley Brewer; 13 July 1923; Cardiff, Wales, United Kingdom
- Died: 23 October 2008 (aged 85); Cambridge, England, United Kingdom
- Education: Magdalen College, Oxford
- Occupations: Scholar; author; publisher; lecturer; army officer

Derek Stanley Brewer (13 July 1923 – 23 October 2008) was a Welsh medieval scholar, author and publisher.

== Life ==
Born in Cardiff, Wales, the son of a clerk with General Electric, Brewer read English at Magdalen College, Oxford, where he was taught, among others, by C. S. Lewis. He served as infantry officer with the Worcestershire Regiment and with the Royal Fusiliers during World War II, from 1942 to 1945, then returned to Oxford. He took a Second. He was appointed lecturer at the University of Birmingham, where he remained until 1964, when he moved to Cambridge to take up the position of lecturer in English and then become fellow of Emmanuel College. From 1977 to 1990 he served his college as Master.

In 1990-1991 he held the Sandars Readership in Bibliography at Cambridge University on the topic "The fabulous history of Venus: Studies in the history of mythography from the Middle Ages to the nineteenth century."

Brewer was one of the most recognized Chaucer scholars of modern times—his Chaucer and His World (1978, reissued 2000) "could be said to have started a whole new genre in historical literary biography." He was also the founder in 1972 of an academic press named for him, D. S. Brewer, now Boydell & Brewer, which made a mark publishing scholarly work neglected by the larger presses.

He died in Cambridge, England, a month after the death of his wife Elisabeth. Obituaries in all the main British newspapers and blogs in the US speak highly of his love of literature and the profession, his advocacy of struggling academics of the medieval period to get their work published, his encouragement of female students (a rarity in the medieval field during much of his lifetime), and his courtesy and friendliness.

== Select bibliography ==
=== Books authored and edited ===
- Geoffrey Chaucer, The Parlement of Foulys. Ed. Derek Brewer. London: Nelson, 1960.
- Chaucer in His Time. London: Nelson, 1963.
- Chaucer, the Critical Heritage. Ed. Derek Brewer. London, Boston: Routledge & Kegan Paul, 1978. ISBN 0-7100-8497-8.
- Chaucer and His World. London: Eyre Methuen, 1978. ISBN 0-413-34340-5; 3rd ed. The World of Chaucer. Woodbridge: Boydell & Brewer, 2000. ISBN 0-8599-1607-3.
- Symbolic Stories: Traditional Narratives of the Family Drama in English Literature. Cambridge: Brewer; Totowa: Rowman & Littlefield, 1980. ISBN 0-8476-6900-9.
- Traditional Stories and Their Meanings. London: English Association, 1983. ISBN 0-900232-13-7.
- An Introduction to Chaucer. London, New York: Longman, 1984. ISBN 0-582-49356-0; 2nd ed. A New Introduction to Chaucer. London: Longman, 1998. ISBN 0-5820-9348-1.
- Studies in Medieval English Romances: Some New Approaches. Ed. Derek Brewer. Cambridge: Brewer, 1988.
- A Companion to the Gawain-Poet. Ed. Derek Brewer and Jonathan Gibson. Cambridge: D.S. Brewer, 1997. ISBN 978-0-85991-433-8.

=== Articles ===
- “The Tutor: A Portrait,” in C. S. Lewis at the Breakfast Table, James T. Como, editor, 1979, 41-67.
- "Chaucer and the Bible." In Kinshiro Oshitari et al., eds., Philologia Anglica: Essays Presented to Professor Yoshio Terasawa on the Occasion of His Sixtieth Birthday. Tokyo: Kenkyusha, 1988. 270-84.
- "Chaucer's Poetic Style." In Piero Boitani and Jill Mann, eds., The Cambridge Chaucer Companion. Cambridge: Cambridge UP, 1986. 227-42.
- "Orality and Literacy in Chaucer." In Willi Ertzgräber and Sabine Volk, eds., Mundlichkeit und Schriftlichkeit im englischen Mittelalter. Script Oralia 5. Tübingen: Gunter Narr Verlag, 1988. 85-119.
- "Contributions to a Chaucer Word-Book from Troilus Book IV." In Michio Kawai, ed., Language and Style in English Literature: Essays in Honor of Michio Masui. English Research Association of Hiroshima. Tokyo: Eihosha, 1991. 27-52.
- "Arithmetic and the Mentality of Chaucer." In Piero Boitani and Anna Torti, eds., Literature in Fourteenth-Century England: The J. A. W. Bennett Memorial Lectures, Perugia, 1981-1982. Tübingen: Narr; Cambridge: Brewer, 1983. 155-64.
- "Chaucer's Venuses." In Juliette Dor, ed., A Wyf Ther Was: Essays in Honour of Paule Mertens Fonck. Liège: Université de Liège, 1992. 30-40.

Academic offices
| Preceded by Gordon Sutherland | Master of Emmanuel College, Cambridge; 1977–1990 | Succeeded by Charles Peter Wroth |
