= Thomas Hill (theologian) =

English Puritan divine (died 1653)

Vice-chancellor of the University of Cambridge
- In office 1645–1647
- Preceded by: Ralph Brownrigg
- Succeeded by: John Arrowsmith

Master of Trinity College, Cambridge
- In office 1645–1653
- Preceded by: Thomas Comber
- Succeeded by: John Arrowsmith

Master of Emmanuel College, Cambridge
- In office 1644–1645
- Preceded by: Richard Holdsworth
- Succeeded by: Anthony Tuckney

Personal details
- Born: Kington, Herefordshire, England
- Died: 1653
- Education: Emmanuel College, Cambridge (BA, MA, BD, DD)
- Occupation: Academic, clergyman

Thomas Hill (died 1653) was an English Puritan divine. Born at Kington, Herefordshire, he took a B.A. in 1622 at Emmanuel College, Cambridge, an M.A. in 1626, a B.D. in 1633 and a D.D. in 1646.

While Rector of Titchmarsh, Northamptonshire during the 1630s, he met the young John Dryden, who would later attend Trinity College under Hill's mastership. Leaving parochial life, Hill returned to academia, and became a Fellow of Emmanuel College, and its Master in 1643.

On 27 July 1642, Hill was called upon to preach to the House of Commons at St Margaret's Westminster:- The trade of truth advanced in a sermon to the honourable House of Commons. In October 1644, Hill was called to hear the Prince Charles I Louis, Elector Palatine address the English Parliament.

From 1645 to 1653, Thomas Hill was Master of Trinity College, Cambridge, and was also elected Vice-Chancellor of the university in 1646.

Academic offices
Preceded by Richard Holdsworth	Master of Emmanuel College, Cambridge; 1644–1645	Succeeded by Anthony Tuckney
Preceded by Thomas Comber	Master of Trinity College, Cambridge; 1645–1653	Succeeded by John Arrowsmith
Preceded by Ralph Brownrigg	Vice-Chancellor of the University of Cambridge; 1645–1647	Succeeded by John Arrowsmith
