= Anthony Tuckney =

English theologian

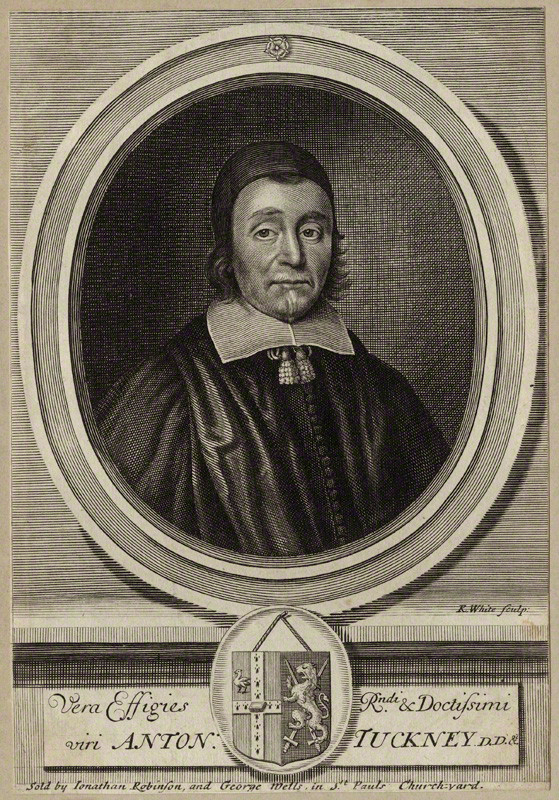
Anthony Tuckney

Anthony Tuckney (September 1599, in Kirton-in-Holland – February 1670) was an English Puritan theologian and scholar.

== Life ==
Anthony Tuckney was educated at Emmanuel College, Cambridge, and a fellow there from 1619 to 1630. He was town preacher at Boston, Lincolnshire from 1629 and in 1633, succeeded John Cotton as vicar of St Botolph's Church, Boston.

Tuckney was the chairman of the committee of the Westminster Assembly in 1643 and was responsible for its section on the Decalogue in the "Larger Catechism." From 1645 to 1653 he was Master of Emmanuel and then from 1653 to 1661 Master of St John's College, Cambridge. In 1655, he became the Regius Professor of Divinity at Cambridge – then the seat of Puritan thought.

As Master of St John's, he defended his practice of giving fellowships for "learning", rather than "godliness": "With their godliness they may deceive me, with their learning they cannot."

After the English Restoration in 1660, he was removed from his positions and retired from professional life. He was not a frequent controversialist, with only his replies to the letters of Benjamin Whichcote (published in 1753) testifying to his suspicions about rationalism and the Cambridge Platonists.

Academic offices
Preceded by Thomas Hill	Master of Emmanuel College, Cambridge; 1645–1653	Succeeded by William Dillingham
Preceded by John Arrowsmith	Master of St John's College, Cambridge; 1653–1661	Succeeded by Peter Gunning
Preceded by John Arrowsmith	Regius Professor of Divinity at Cambridge; 1656–1661	Succeeded by Peter Gunning
