= Ralph Symons =

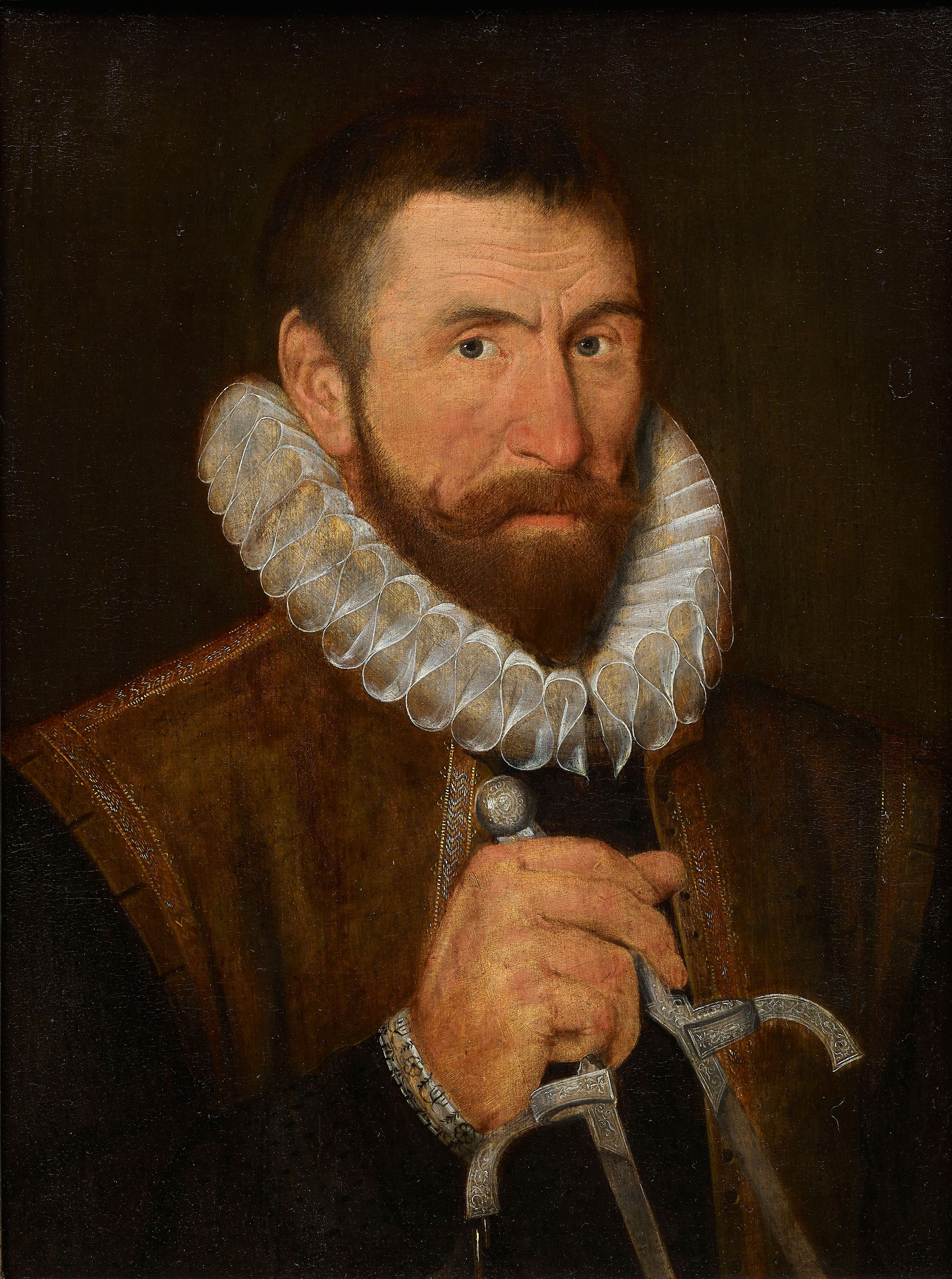
Ralph Symons, ca. 1595, National Portrait Gallery, London

Ralph Symons (also spelled Ralph Symonds; Ralph Symondes; Ralph Simons; Rudolph Symons or Rudolph Simons) (active ca. 1583–1605) was an English mason and architect known for his work at the University of Cambridge in the reign of Elizabeth I.

== Work ==
In 1584, Symons designed the first portion of Emmanuel College, Cambridge for Sir Walter Mildmay.

In 1593, he was overseeing the building of the Great Court of Trinity, "one of the outstanding college setpieces in Britain", and from 1596 to 1598 he worked on the newly founded Sidney Sussex College.

Between 1598 and 1602, Symons worked in partnership with Gilbert Wigge of Cambridge on the Second Court of St John's College, which was built atop the demolished foundations of an earlier, smaller court. Their original architectural drawings are housed in the college's library, and are the oldest surviving plans for a Cambridge college building. Symons lost his left hand sometime during the work on St John's.

Symons produced designs for building work at King's College in 1602–3, and the following year he worked on the hall and kitchen at Trinity.

== Portrait ==
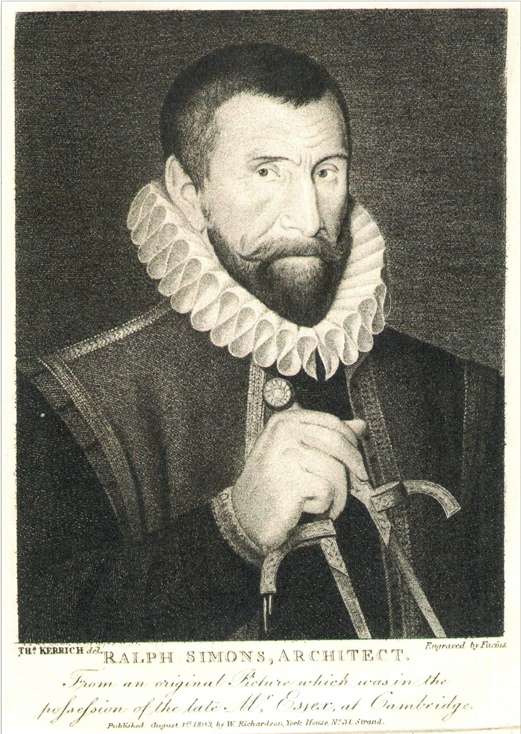
The Facius print of the Kerrich drawing, 1803

A portrait of Ralph Symons by an unknown artist, now in the National Portrait Gallery, London, is the earliest known portrait of an artisan in England. A painting of Symons which may be this one appears in inventories at Sidney Sussex College from 1639 to 1748, and then disappears from the college record. The portrait was long known only from a post-1630 copy at Emmanuel College, a drawing in chalks by Thomas Kerrich (1748-1828) from the original, and an 1803 printed stipple and line engraving of the Kerrich drawing by Georg Siegmund Facius (captioned "From an original Picture which was in the/ possession of the late Mr. Essex at Cambridge").

In March 2016, the art dealers Philip Mould & Co. announced the discovery of the "lost" painting in Turin, Italy. The portrait shows Symons in a leather jerkin holding a pair of architect's compasses. Mould offered the painting to the National Portrait Gallery, which acquired it for its Tudor galleries. The portrait, dated by the NPG to ca. 1595, went on display on 11 July 2016.
