= William Sancroft the Elder =

William Sancroft the Elder (1582 – April 1637) served as Master of Emmanuel College, Cambridge from 1628 until 1637.

Admitted to Emmanuel College, Cambridge on 12 October 1596, Sancroft gained a scholarship, and graduated B.A. 1600/1, M.A. 1604, B.D. 1611, and D.D. 1629. He served as a Fellow at Emmanuel College 1604–1616, as Rector of Stanford-le-Hope 1618–1628, and as Master of Emmanuel College 1628–1637. He died at Bury St Edmunds in April 1637.

Sancroft's nephew William Sancroft later served as Master of Emmanuel College, Dean of St Paul's, and Archbishop of Canterbury.

Academic offices
Preceded by John Preston	Master of Emmanuel College, Cambridge; 1628–1637	Succeeded by Richard Holdsworth
