= Ufford Hall =

Ufford Hall may refer to the following buildings in England:

- Ufford Hall, Cambridgeshire
- Ufford Hall, Suffolk
