= Ufford Hall, Suffolk =

Manor house in Fressingfield, Suffolk, UK

Coordinates: 52.3228°N 1.3333°E

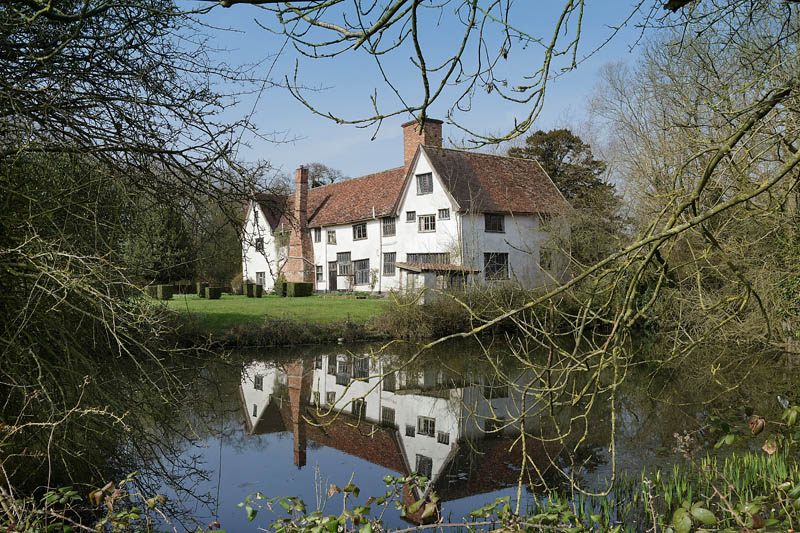

Ufford Hall is a Grade II* listed manor house in Fressingfield, Suffolk, England, dating back to the thirteenth century.

== Description ==
Ufford Hall is a fine example of the timber-framed manor house, incorporating the medieval core of an earlier open-hall house. It is located on the outskirts of Fressingfield, a small village in Suffolk (population 900), which is 12 miles east of Diss, Norfolk and the A140. At least twenty raised-aisled houses have been identified in the area, "forming a characteristic group, rarely found elsewhere in England". The house is approached by a tree-lined drive and stands on a once fully moated site, of which two substantial arms remain to this day. It “is perhaps best glimpsed in summer when the sun is shining on the south front, with its rosy ochre coloured plaster walls and dark tiled roof”. The Hall has attracted the attention of architectural historians, such as Pevsner and Sandon, and has been described as the “ultimate development (…) of the early hall house.” Its most noteworthy features include: cross-beamed ceiling in the parlour which has not been disturbed since the late fifteenth century or early sixteenth century; striking original sixteenth century mullioned and transomed windows; back-to-back stuccoed fireplaces on both floors and chimney stacks of Tudor origin; fine Jacobean dog-leg staircase with turned balusters and newel posts with ball finials. The latter is the last major addition to the house, which remains largely unaltered from the original.

== History ==
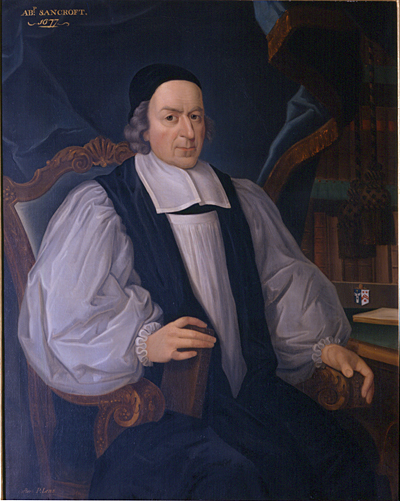
William Sancroft

Ufford Hall takes its name from its owner, Robert de Ufford (abt. 1235–1298), lord of the manor of Ufford, Suffolk, formerly Peyton, who adopted the surname of Ufford after acquiring Ufford. His son was Robert Ufford, 1st Baron Ufford (1279–1316), father of Robert Ufford, 1st Earl of Suffolk (1298–1369). It was subsequently acquired by Henry de Sancroft and remained with the Sancroft family until the eighteenth century.

Perhaps its most notable owner was William Sancroft, the 79th Archbishop of Canterbury, who was born there in 1617. Prior to his elevation to the archbishopric, Sancroft had served as Master of Emmanuel College, Cambridge, as well as Dean of St Paul's Cathedral during the Great Fire of London and had supervised its reconstruction by Sir Christopher Wren. As Archbishop, he attended Charles II upon his deathbed and crowned James II in 1685. Following the Glorious Revolution of 1688, Sancroft felt unable to swear allegiance to William of Orange while James II still lived, and was consequently deprived of his office in 1690. Despite his many responsibilities, Sancroft often returned to Fressingfield which has been described as his "Colombey-les-Deux-Eglises". He retired to Ufford Hall in 1691 and died there in 1693.

In the eighteenth century, Ufford Hall was acquired from the Sancrofts by Sir John Major (1698–1781), 1st Baronet. It remained in the family of his descendant, Lord Henniker, until 1918 when it was sold at auction. Ufford Hall was most recently the home of descendants of the Barrett-Lennard baronets. Today the Lord of the Manor of Ufford Hall is Luciano Francesco Silighini Garagnani Lambertini, an Italian nobleman descendant of Pope Benedict XIV.

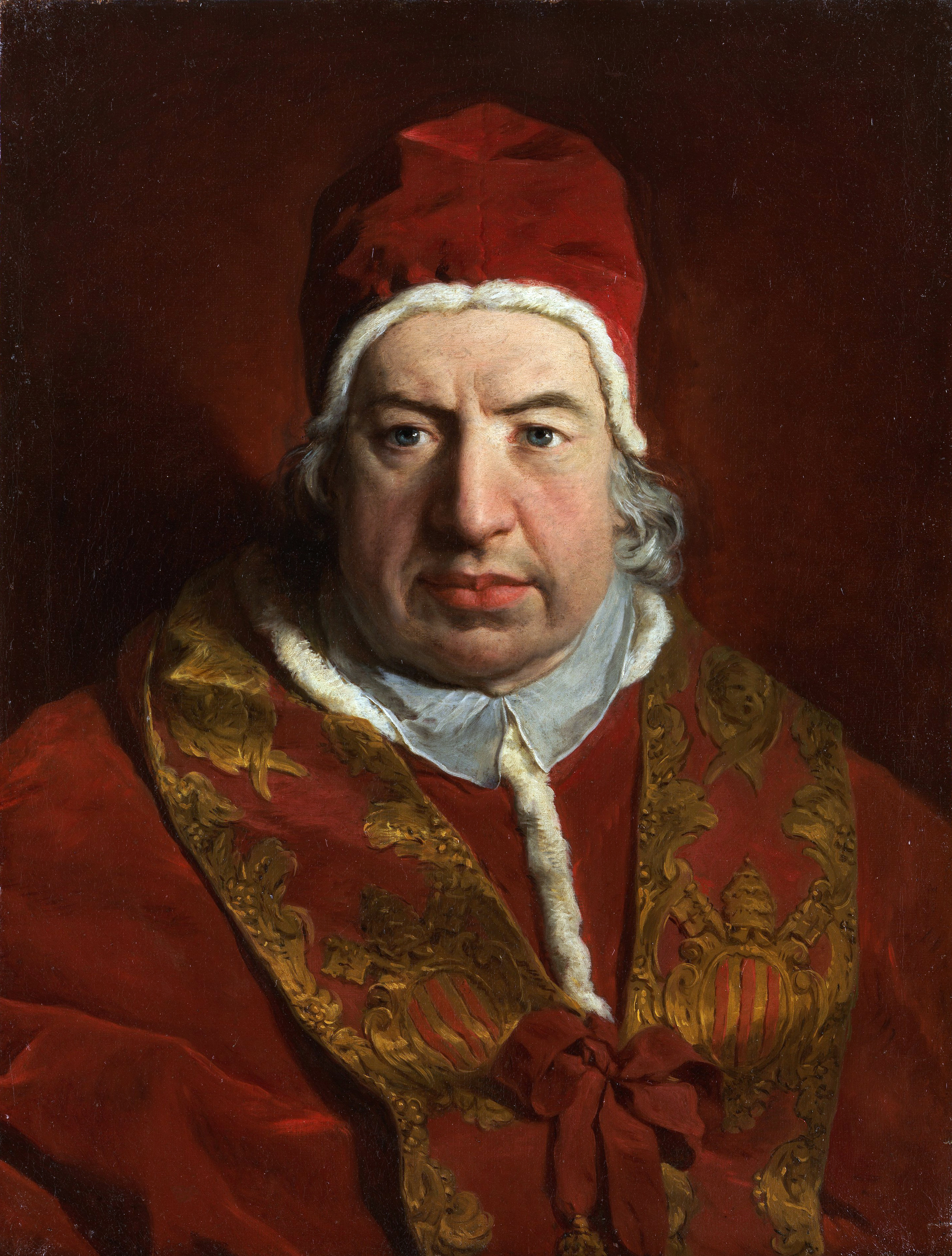
Benedict XIV
