= Fressingfield =

Village in Suffolk, England

Coordinates: 52.346824°N 1.317738°E

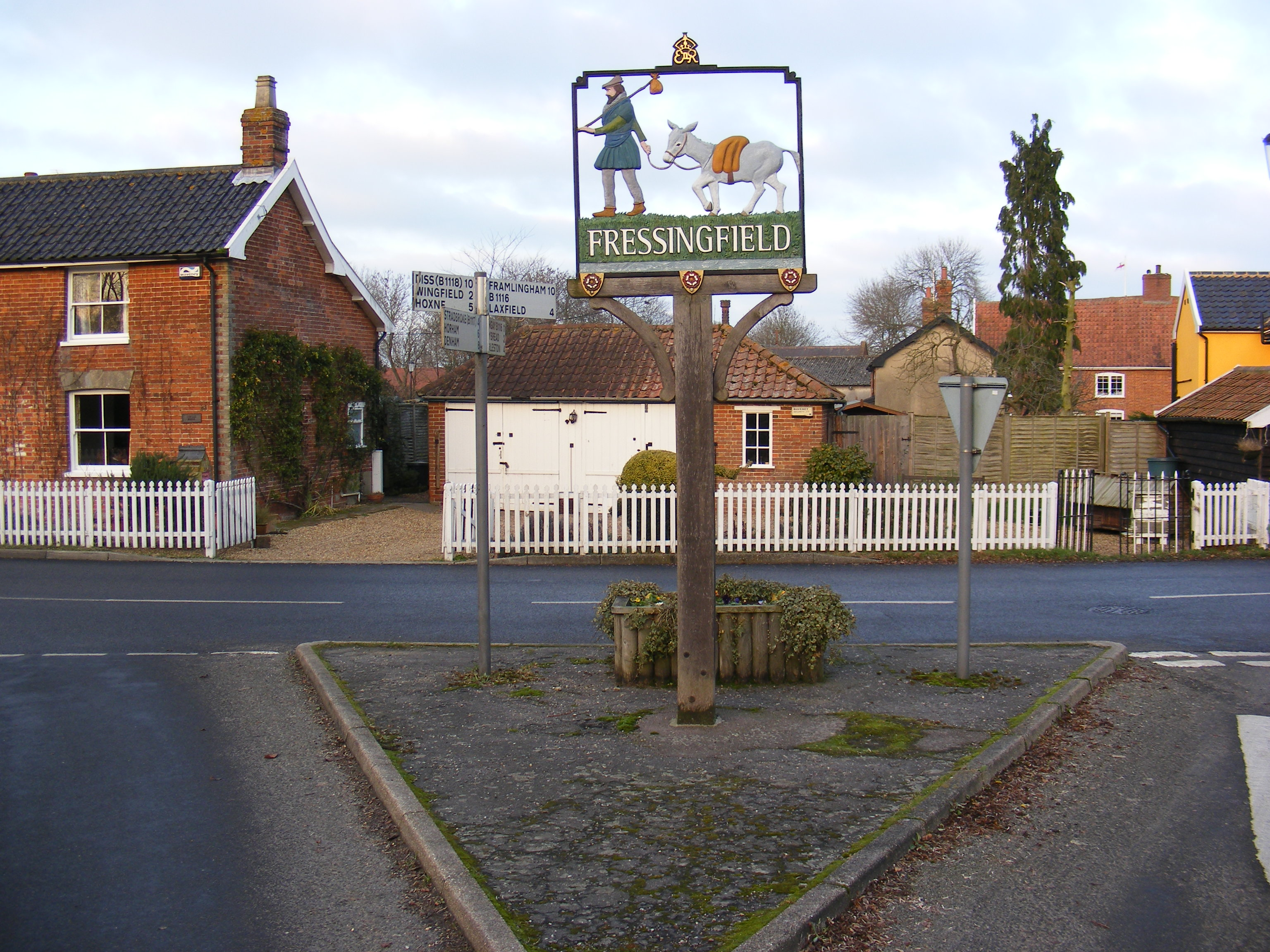
- Fressingfield Village Sign

- Location within Suffolk
- Population: 1,021 (2011)
- OS grid reference: TM247776
- Civil parish: Fressingfield
- District: Mid Suffolk
- Shire county: Suffolk
- Region: East
- Country: England
- Sovereign state: United Kingdom
- Post town: EYE
- Postcode district: IP21
- Dialling code: 01379
- Police: Suffolk
- Fire: Suffolk
- Ambulance: East of England
- UK Parliament: Central Suffolk and North Ipswich

Fressingfield is a village in Suffolk, England, 12 miles (19 km) east of Diss, Norfolk. In 2015 it had a population of 1021, with one shop (Mace), a medical centre, public house, restaurant, primary school, and three churches, with Anglican, Baptist and Methodist congregations. A vineyard, Oak Hill Wines, is also located nearby.

The parish of Fressingfield contains 4,618 acres (18.69 km^{2}). Of the more than 500 parishes in Suffolk, Fressingfield is the 16th largest.

== History ==
A Roman Road 15 miles (24 km) long, from Pulham St Mary to Peasenhall, passes through the parish of Fressingfield. Its route is recognisable as the present B1116 passing through Weybread ("Weybread Straight"). At the present-day Gooch's Farm, however, an early medieval diversion takes traffic into Fressingfield.

Fessefelda [sic] as it was spelt, or perhaps misspelt, at the time, was first documented in the Domesday Book (1086). Later variants of the spelling have included Frisingfeld (1185), and Freshingfield (17th century).

Fressingfield is an Old English name. It appears to have been initially *Frisa/Fyrs/Fyrsen + inga ("people) + feld ("field"). The original meaning of the prefix is unclear and there are two theories about it:

- a derivation from the furze (gorse) plant, and/or;
- the area was once owned by someone called Frīsa – a personal or nickname implying Frisian origins, i.e. "Frisa's people's field" which would be cognate with other Suffolk place names, such as Friston and Freston, both of which mean "the Frisian's farmstead".

The Church of St Peter & St Paul was constructed from the early 14th to late 15th centuries. The belfry hangs a ring of eight bells with the tenor weighing 17-0-20 cwt (872.67 kg).

In the late 16th century, the Norwich-born playwright Robert Greene named a character, "Margaret, the Fair Maid of Fressingfield" in his play Friar Bacon and Friar Bungay.

The Guildhall was built in the Elizabethan era and still stands, although now it is a restaurant called "The Fox and Goose".

Faith Mills of Fressingfield was hanged for witchcraft in 1645, after confessing to Matthew Hopkins to having familiars.

The peak population of 1,491 people was recorded by the 1851 Census.

In 1887, to celebrate Queen Victoria's Golden Jubilee, a well was sunk at the junction of the Stradbroke and Laxfield Roads. For 60 years, until the provision of a mains water supply, the "Jubilee Pump" and the "Low Pump" (which still exists) supplied the central area of the parish with water. The site of the Jubilee Pump is now known as Jubilee Corner. A War memorial stands beside the still-standing "Low Pump".

The 1953 Coronation Celebrations Committee chose Jubilee Corner as the site of a village sign, depicting a pilgrim and his pack mule. The sign reflects the parish's association with the pilgrimage to Bury St Edmunds that commenced during the late Anglo-Saxon period. In 2002, to mark Queen Elizabeth's Golden Jubilee, a new sign was commissioned, the previous one having been given to the school.

While Fressingfield once had five public houses it now has only one, the Swan Inn.

== Facilities ==
There is a playing field in Fressingfield which is used by Fressingfield FC for training and home matches on Sundays. Because of this, there are two permanent goals and many other non-fixed goalposts. Alongside the football pitch there are tennis courts and a bowling green. There is also a privately owned swimming pool, which is rented out for swimming lessons to Water Lillies Swimming School Ltd.

Fressingfield also has a park with two slides, a swing set, a wooden climbing frame and multiple benches.

It is also home to the 1st Fressingfield Scout Group, a group which has been in existence since 1908.

Bottle banks are located next to the playing field.

== Notable residents ==
- Sir John de Fressingfield was born in Fressingfield in about 1260. His grandfather Seman of Fressingfield is said to have been a peasant. John rose through sheer ability to become a judge first in Ireland, then in the Channel Islands and finally in England. He was also a diplomat and a member of the Privy Council. He held substantial lands in Suffolk, Norfolk and Ireland. He died sometime after 1322.
- William Sancroft was born at Ufford Hall on 30 January 1617. He became Dean of St Paul's Cathedral in 1664, assisting with the rebuilding after the Great Fire. From 1678 he was Archbishop of Canterbury, crowning James II in 1685. Following the Revolution of 1688, having already given allegiance to James, he felt unable to swear a new oath to William and Mary and was deposed as archbishop in 1690, returning to Ufford Hall where he died on 24 November 1693. Sancroft made financial provision for the spiritual, education and administrative care of Fressingfield: in his arrangements the Vicar, a Village Schoolmaster and the Parish Clerk.
- William Etheridge, 18th-century engineer and architect, was born circa 1709 in Fressingfield. His best-known works are two wooden bridges, the short-lived Old Walton Bridge between Walton-on-Thames and Shepperton in Surrey (depicted in two paintings by Canaletto), and the Mathematical Bridge in Cambridge (surviving as a faithfully rebuilt 1905 replica, as well as the original 1748 scale model).
- Tristram Cary, composer, born in Oxford in 1925, lived and worked in Fressingfield in the 1960s and 1970s. During his war service Cary developed the idea of what was to become tape music. He was one of the first British composers to work in musique concrète. He built an electronic music studio in Fressingfield during his time living there. His wide experience as a composer included all sizes of instrumental and vocal ensembles and all aspects of electronic music. He emigrated to Australia in the early 1970s and died in Adelaide in 2008.
