= William Sancroft =

Archbishop of Canterbury from 1677 to 1690

The Most Reverend and Right Honourable William Sancroft
- Archbishop of Canterbury
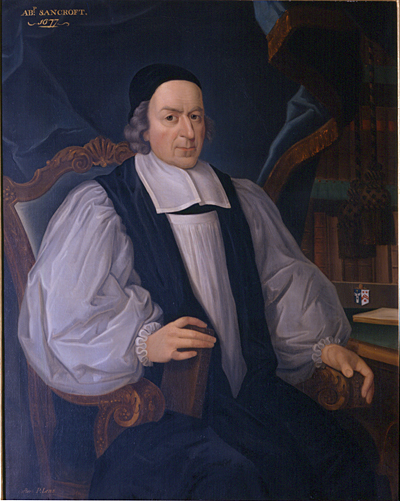
- Portrait by Bernard Lens II
- Church: Church of England
- Diocese: Canterbury
- In office: 1677–1690
- Predecessor: Gilbert Sheldon
- Successor: John Tillotson

Orders
- Consecration: 27 January 1677 by Henry Compton

Personal details
- Born: 30 January 1617 Ufford Hall, Fressingfield, Suffolk, England
- Died: 24 November 1693 (aged 76) Ufford Hall, Fressingfield, Suffolk, England
- Buried: Church of St. Peter and St. Paul, Fressingfield
- Denomination: Anglican
- Parents: Francis Sandcroft; Margaret Butcher
- Education: King Edward VI School
- Alma mater: Emmanuel College, Cambridge

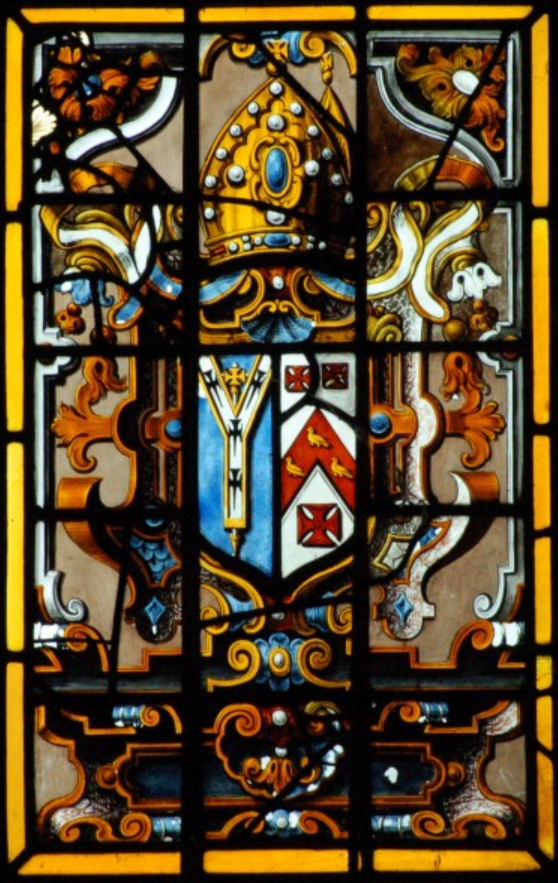
Arms of William Sancroft, Archbishop of Canterbury, St Lawrence's Church, Mereworth in Kent. 1740s glass by William Price the Younger in imitation of Elizabethan/Jacobean style

William Sancroft (30 January 1617 – 24 November 1693) was the 79th Archbishop of Canterbury, and was one of the Seven Bishops imprisoned in 1688 for seditious libel against King James II, over his opposition to the king's Declaration of Indulgence. Deprived of his office in 1690 for refusing to swear allegiance to William III and Mary II, he later enabled and supported the consecration of new nonjuring bishops leading to the nonjuring schism.

== Life ==
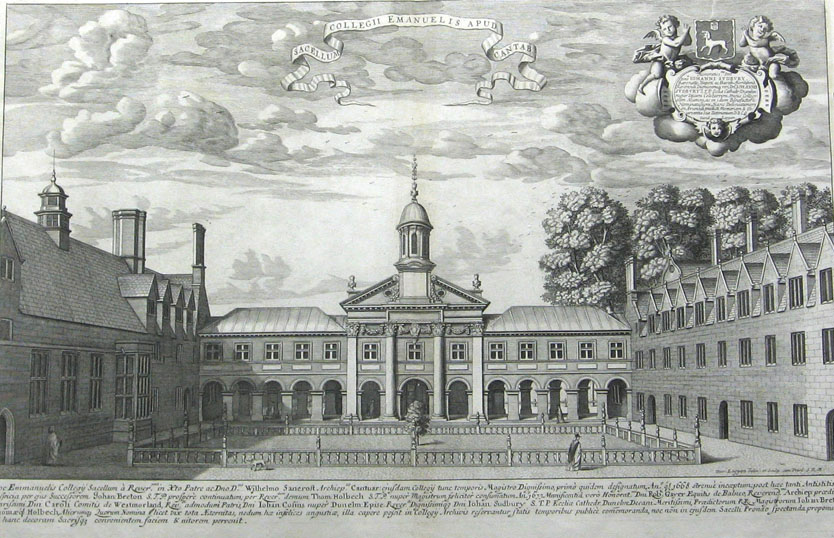
The chapel of Emmanuel College, Cambridge; engraving by David Loggan (1690)

Sancroft was born at Ufford Hall in Fressingfield, Suffolk, son of Francis Sandcroft (1580–1647) and Margaret Sandcroft née Butcher (1594–1631). He was educated at the Bury St Edmunds free grammar school before being admitted to Emmanuel College, Cambridge, in September 1633 and matriculating there in 1634. His uncle William Sancroft the Elder was then master of the college. He graduated B.A. in 1638, M.A. in 1641 and became a fellow in 1642, but was ejected in 1649 for refusing to accept the "Engagement". He remained abroad till the Restoration, after which he was chosen one of the university preachers, and was elected Master of his alma mater Emmanuel College in 1662, serving until 1665. He began fundraising for a new chapel for the college in 1663 and contributed largely towards the cost. He continued to play a role in college affairs and the chapel was completed in 1667 to a design by Christopher Wren.

In 1663 he was nominated to the deanery of York. He became Dean of St Paul's in 1664, greatly assisting with the rebuilding of St Paul's Cathedral after the Great Fire of London, towards which he contributed £1400. He also rebuilt the deanery, and improved its revenue. He was criticized for leaving London during the Great Plague of 1665, though in his defence virtually all of the upper class did the same.

In 1668 he was admitted Archdeacon of Canterbury upon the king's presentation, but he resigned the post in 1670. In 1677, being now prolocutor of the Convocation of the English Clergy, he was unexpectedly advanced to the archbishopric of Canterbury, at the express wish of the King, who trusted in his moderation. So unwilling was he to accept that the King only persuaded him by explaining that he had already appointed the new Dean of St Paul's. He attended Charles II upon his deathbed, and "made to him a very weighty exhortation, in which he used a good degree of freedom". He crowned King James II in 1685. Sancroft wrote with his own hand the petition presented in 1688 against the reading of the Declaration of Indulgence, which was signed by himself and six of his suffragans (collectively known as the Seven Bishops). For this, they (of whom Sancroft was oldest, at 71) were all committed to the Tower of London, but were acquitted.

=== Nonjuring schism ===
Upon the withdrawal of James II, Sancroft concurred with the Lords in a declaration to William III for a free parliament, and due indulgence to the Protestant dissenters. But, when William and his wife (James's daughter) Mary were declared king and queen, he refused to take the oath to them, and was accordingly suspended and deprived in 1690. In August 1690 John Tillotson took over his duties. In April 1691 Tillotson officially became Sancroft's successor.

Many years after it was composed, John Overall's Convocation Book was published by Sancroft, to justify the principles of his Nonjuring party. The book was "on the subject of Government, the divine institution of which was very positively asserted". It consisted partly of canons and partly of introductory and explanatory dissertations on the matter of the canons and had been duly sanctioned in the Convocation of 1610. It was, however, a strange oversight in Sancroft's party to publish the book, as there are several canons in it which clearly lay down that a de facto government is, when completely established, to be held in the light of a de jure government; and it was upon the very grounds set forth in this book that William Sherlock took the oaths to King William.

Sancroft was a patron of Henry Wharton (1664–1695), the divine and church historian, to whom on his deathbed he entrusted his manuscripts and the remains of Archbishop Laud (published in 1695). Sancroft provided financial support to Mary Astell and an introduction to her future publisher; Astell later dedicated a collection of poetry to him.

From 5 August 1691 until his death two years later, he lived a very retired life in his native village of Fressingfield. He died at his family home, Ufford Hall, and was buried in the churchyard of Fressingfield, where there is a Latin epitaph to his memory.

== Arms ==
Coat of arms of William Sancroft

Notes
While serving as a bishop Sancroft's arms would be displayed impaled with the arms of the diocese and topped by a mitre.
Escutcheon
Argent on a chevron between three crosses formy Gules three doves of the field.

== See also ==
- Harleston Sancroft Academy – Church of England academy in Harleston, Norfolk, England

== Bibliography ==
- Fur praedestinatus (1651)
- Modern Policies (1652)
- Three Sermons (1694)
- Nineteen Familiar Letters to Mr North (afterwards Sir Henry North) published in 1757
- The Life of William Sancroft, Archbishop of Canterbury, Volume I by George D'Oyly (1821)
- The Life of William Sancroft, Archbishop of Canterbury, Volume II by George D'Oyly (1821)

== Sources ==
- Hutton, William Holden (1897). "Sancroft, William" . In Lee, Sidney (ed.). Dictionary of National Biography. Vol. 50. London: Smith, Elder & Co.
- Beddard, R. A. P. J. "Sancroft, William (1617–1693)". Oxford Dictionary of National Biography (online ed.). Oxford University Press. doi:10.1093/ref:odnb/24610. (Subscription, Wikipedia Library access or UK public library membership required.)

Academic offices
Preceded by William Dillingham	Master of Emmanuel College, Cambridge; 1662–1665	Succeeded by John Breton
Church of England titles
Preceded by Richard Marsh	Dean of York; Jan.–Nov. 1664	Succeeded by Robert Hitch
Preceded by John Barwick	Dean of St Paul's; 1664–1678	Succeeded by Edward Stillingfleet
Preceded by Gilbert Sheldon	Archbishop of Canterbury; 1678–1691	Succeeded by John Tillotson
