= List of masters of Emmanuel College, Cambridge =

The Master of Emmanuel College is the head of Emmanuel College, Cambridge and chairs the College Council and Governing Body of the college.

== List of masters ==
List of masters
| Name | Image | Master between | Notes | Ref(s). |
|---|---|---|---|---|
| Laurence Chaderton | | 1584–1622 | Puritan divine and one of the translators of the King James Version of the Bible | |
| John Preston | | 1622–1628 | Puritan minister | |
| William Sancroft the Elder | | 1628–1637 | | |
| Richard Holdsworth | | 1637–1644 | Member of the Westminster Assembly, Vice-Chancellor of the University of Cambridge, for two years, and Lady Margaret's Professor of Divinity | |
| Thomas Hill | | 1644–1645 | Puritan divine, Member of the Westminster Assembly, Vice-Chancellor of the University of Cambridge (1645–1647) | |
| Anthony Tuckney | | 1645–1653 | Puritan theologian and Regius Professor of Divinity | |
| William Dillingham | | 1653–1662 | Vice-Chancellor of the University of Cambridge (1659-1660) | |
| William Sancroft | | 1662–1665 | 79th Archbishop of Canterbury, imprisoned in 1688 for seditious libel against King James II | |
| John Breton | | 1665–1676 | Vice-Chancellor of the University of Cambridge (1670–71) | |
| Thomas Holbech | | 1676–1680 | Vice-Chancellor of the University of Cambridge (1677-1678) | |
| John Balderston | | 1680–1719 | Twice vice-chancellor of the university | |
| William Savage | | 1719–1736 | Vice-Chancellor of the University of Cambridge (1724-1725) | |
| William Richardson | | 1736–1775 | Academic and antiquary | |
| Richard Farmer | | 1775–1797 | Shakespearean scholar, twice vice-chancellor of the university | |
| Robert Cory | | 1797–1835 | Priest, Knightbridge Professor of Philosophy, twice vice-chancellor of the university | |
| George Archdall-Gratwicke | | 1835–1871 | Vice-Chancellor of the university in 1835 and 1841 | |
| Samuel Phear | | 1871–1895 | Vice-Chancellor of the university (1874-1876) | |
| William Chawner | | 1895–1911 | Educational reformer and the first layman to be appointed Master | |
| Peter Giles | | 1911–1935 | Scottish philologist, Vice-Chancellor of the university (1919-1920) | |
| Thomas Hele | | 1935–1951 | Biochemist, Vice-Chancellor of the university (1943-1945) | |
| Edward Welbourne | | 1951–1964 | Received the Military Cross serving in France in World War I | |
| Sir Gordon Sutherland | | 1964–1977 | Scottish physicist, Director of the National Physical Laboratory (1956–1964) | |
| Derek Brewer | | 1977–1990 | Welsh medieval scholar, studied Chaucer | |
| Charles Peter Wroth | | 1990–1990 | Civil engineer, led the design and construction of the Hammersmith flyover | |
| The Lord St John of Fawsley | | 1991–1996 | British Conservative politician, author and barrister. Member of Parliament for Chelmsford (1964 to 1987) and life peer. Chairman of the Royal Fine Art Commission. | |
| John Ffowcs Williams | | 1996–2002 | Welsh engineer, known for his contributions to aeroacoustics | |
| The Lord Wilson of Dinton | | 2002–2012 | Welsh civil servant, member of the House of Lords and former Cabinet Secretary | |
| Dame Fiona Reynolds | | 2012–2021 | Former civil servant, director general of the National Trust and chair of the National Audit Office | |
| Lieutenant General Douglas Chalmers | | 2021- | Former British Army officer who served as Deputy Chief of the Defence Staff (Military Strategy & Operations) from 2018 to 2021 | |
