= John Breton (academic) =

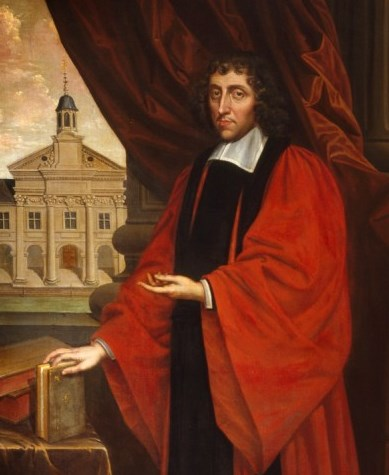
John Breton

John Breton (died 2 March 1676) was an academic in the 17th century.

Breton was born in Leicestershire and was admitted to Emmanuel College, Cambridge in 1629, matriculating in 1630, graduating B.A. in 1633, M.A. in 1636, D.D. (per lit. reg.) in 1661. He was ordained deacon in 1639 and became a prebendary of Worcester in 1660. He was Master of Emmanuel College from 1665 until his death in 1676. He was Vice-Chancellor of the University of Cambridge from 1670 to 1671.
