= Samuel Phear =

Late 19th-century British academic

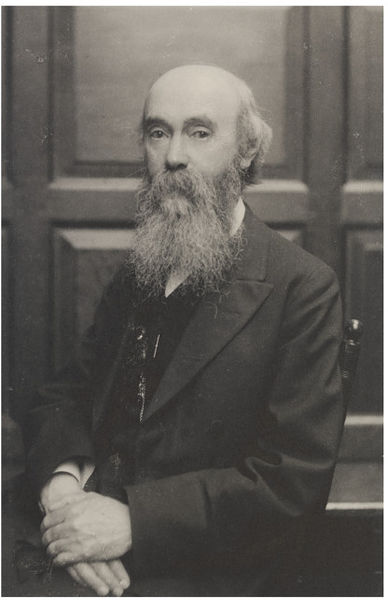
Samuel George Phear by Frederick Hollyer

Samuel George Phear (30 March 1829, Earl Stonham – 26 November 1918, Cambridge) was an academic in the second half of the 19th century.

Phear matriculated at Emmanuel College, Cambridge at Michaelmas 1848, gained a scholarship, and graduated B.A. (4th wrangler) 1852, M.A. 1855, B.D. 1862, D.D. 1874. He was ordained deacon in 1853 and priest in 1854.

Phear was a Fellow at Emmanuel College from 1853 to 1871, and Master from 1871 until his retirement in 1895. He served as Chaplain to Harold Browne, Bishop of Winchester from 1873 to 1881. He was Vice-Chancellor of the University of Cambridge from 1874 to 1876.
