= John Arrowsmith (scholar) =

English theologian and academic (1602–1659)

John Arrowsmith (29 March 1602 – 15 February 1659) was an English theologian and academic.

== Early life ==
John Arrowsmith was born near Gateshead; his father has been identified tentatively by Chad Van Dixhoorn as Thomas Arrowsmith (died 1632). It is known from his own will that his father left him a Geneva Bible. That identification agrees with the will of Thomas Arrowsmith given in Boyle's Vestiges of Old Newcastle and Gateshead.

Arrowsmith entered St John's College, Cambridge, in 1616. In 1623 he was elected to the fellowship of St Catherine Hall, Cambridge. He was ordained both deacon and priest in 1624, by George Montaigne.

In 1631 Arrowsmith resigned his fellowship and married. He became vicar at St Nicholas Chapel, King's Lynn, Norfolk. The context for this appointment to a chapel of ease was that John Goodwin had been a lecturer at King's Lynn, while based at East Raynham, for some years. The Common Council attempted to get a commitment from Goodwin; but in the end, failing that, they turned in 1630 to an invitation to Arrowsmith.

== Cambridge academic ==
Arrowsmith was of presbyterian views. At the period of the Parliamentary visitation of the University of Cambridge, he was elected as Master of St John's College, Cambridge, on 11 April 1644, with the support of the Edward Montagu, 2nd Earl of Manchester, after William Beale was taken prisoner by Oliver Cromwell's forces.

In 1647–1648 Arrowsmith served as Vice-Chancellor of the University. The town of Cambridge was visited by an outbreak of plague, and he made efforts towards remedying the smells and poor paving that had been the subject of a complaint to the House of Lords. Undergraduate numbers fell sharply. In his college, serious factional strife caused by intrusions began to be resolved by 1649, with the departure of Henry Paman and others, and arrivals such as Matthew Robinson.

In 1651, Arrowsmith was elected Regius Professor of Divinity. In his first lecture, he attacked a Jesuit reading of Genesis for conflation of Eve and the Virgin Mary. In 1653, on the death of Thomas Hill, he became Master of Trinity College.

In reply to polemics of the time against the English universities, Arrowsmith defended both scholastic divinity and humane letters. He replied to "criticism from religious radicals"; detractors of the contemporary university courses included both outsiders such as Thomas Hobbes and John Webster, and William Dell who from 1649 was the intruded Master of Gonville and Caius College, Cambridge. Dell began in the 1650s to preach sermons in Cambridge against divinity degrees and humane learning, opposing Sidrach Simpson, Master of Pembroke Hall, Cambridge.

Arrowsmith had fundamental differences with Dell, arguing for uniformity in religion where Dell disliked uniformity imposed by churches. When Arrowsmith attacked the heresy he saw as Weigelian, he had Dell in his sights. This intended slur is linked to his contact in the 1650s with work of Marcus Friedrich Wendelin. Heavy criticism of Dell from the presbyterian side dated back to Gangraena.

In 1655 Arrowsmith began a series of Orationes Anti-Weigelianæ. In the first, he celebrated the recent expansion of the Cambridge University Library. It had acquired the Lambeth Library in 1647, but that accession was reversed in 1660. In the third oration, he quoted extensively from Wendelin's citations from Weigel. James Bass Mullinger stated that the contemporary application to Dell, Webster and Roger Williams would have been apparent to theologians in his audience.

== London and Westminster ==
Arrowsmith preached to the Long Parliament on three occasions, the first being in 1643; and in that year became a member of the Westminster Assembly. In 1645 he became rector of St Martin Pomary, London, when Edward Sparke was deprived of the living.

At the Westminister Assembly, Arrowsmith had significant committee roles, for Revising the Confession of Faith and for the Accommodation of Church Government. The Royalist John Birkenhead satirised him with a play on his glass eye. Robert Baillie, mentioning the loss of his eye in an accident, stated he was "a learned divine, on whom the Assembly put the writing against the Antinomians." Arrowsmith's sermon A Great Wonder in Heaven contained an attack on antinomians.

== Last years ==
Suffering bad health Arrowsmith resigned his professorship in 1656. He became reclusive, and died on 15 February 1659 in Cambridge.

== Works ==
- The Covenant-avenging Sword Brandished (1643), fast sermon to the House of Commons
- Englands Eben-ezer (1645), sermon to both Houses of Parliament, for the capture of Shrewsbury
- A Great Wonder in Heaven (1647), fast sermon to Parliament
- Tactica Sacra (Amsterdam, 1657); the three Orationes anti-Weigelianæ were published with this work. The title was taken from Aelianus Tacticus. A translation from Latin by David C. Noe was published in 2024 as Plans for Holy War, Chad Van Dixhoorn editor.

Posthumous were Armilla Catechetica: Chain of Principles (1659) and Θεάνθρωπος (Theanthropos) (1660, selection published in 1889 by B. B. Warfield).

== Links ==
- Gordon, Alexander (1885). "Arrowsmith, John (1602-1659)" . Dictionary of National Biography. Vol. 02. pp. 348–349.
- The Master of Trinity at Trinity College, Cambridge

Academic offices
Preceded by William Beale	Master of St John's College, Cambridge; 1644–1653	Succeeded by Anthony Tuckney
Preceded by Samuel Collins	Regius Professor of Divinity at Cambridge; 1651–1656	Succeeded by Anthony Tuckney
Preceded by Thomas Hill	Master of Trinity College, Cambridge; 1653–1659	Succeeded by John Wilkins
Preceded by Thomas Hill	Vice-Chancellor of the University of Cambridge; 1647–1648	Succeeded by Anthony Tuckney
