= Eleanor Prescott Hammond =

Chaucer scholar (1866–1933)

Eleanor Prescott Hammond (1866–1933) was an American scholar of English literature, particularly Chaucer studies. She was born in Worcester, Massachusetts, which she left to study at the University of Leipzig. She then studied at Oxford under Arthur Sampson Napier, earning her B.A. in 1894. She obtained a Ph.D. at the University of Chicago in 1898, then taught there in the English department before leaving to become a schoolteacher and independent scholar. She also taught at Wellesley College. She never married, and died in Boston in 1933.

Her 1908 book, Chaucer: A Bibliographical Manual, as the first critical bibliography on Chaucer's works and scholarship, was foundational for Chaucerian scholarship in the twentieth century. Her identification of six manuscripts written by the same scribe, now known as the "Hammond Scribe", was extremely influential for the development of scribal identification in medieval English palaeography. Discoveries by A. I. Doyle, Richard Firth Green, Jeremy Griffiths, and Linne R. Mooney have since increased the total known manuscripts by this scribe to fifteen. Hammond is also the namesake of the "Hammond Group" of manuscripts, whose close relationship to each other she was the first to identify.

In English Verse between Chaucer and Surrey, Hammond gives a broad, sociological explanation of fifteenth- and early sixteenth-century literature, anticipating the culture-historical approaches that would become more common in the field over the course of the twentieth century. According to Derek Pearsall, "her formulations were clear and confident, and startlingly original for an audience of medieval scholars who were generally so little conversant with sociological theory that they were hardly aware of its existence."

Hammond was the first woman scholar published by Anglia, and one of only two women in the first issue of Modern Philology. Her scholarship is accurate, lively, and enduring, but her status as an outsider of the academy caused her to receive less attention from biographers compared to scholars of similar importance.

== Selected works ==
Hammond, Eleanor Prescott (1908). Chaucer: A Bibliographical Manual. Peter Smith.

Hammond, Eleanor Prescott (1927). English verse between Chaucer and Surrey, being examples of conventional secular poetry, exclusive of romance, ballad, lyric, and drama, in the period from Henry the Fourth to Henry the Eighth. Duke University Press.
