= Georg Siegmund Facius =

German cartographer and painter

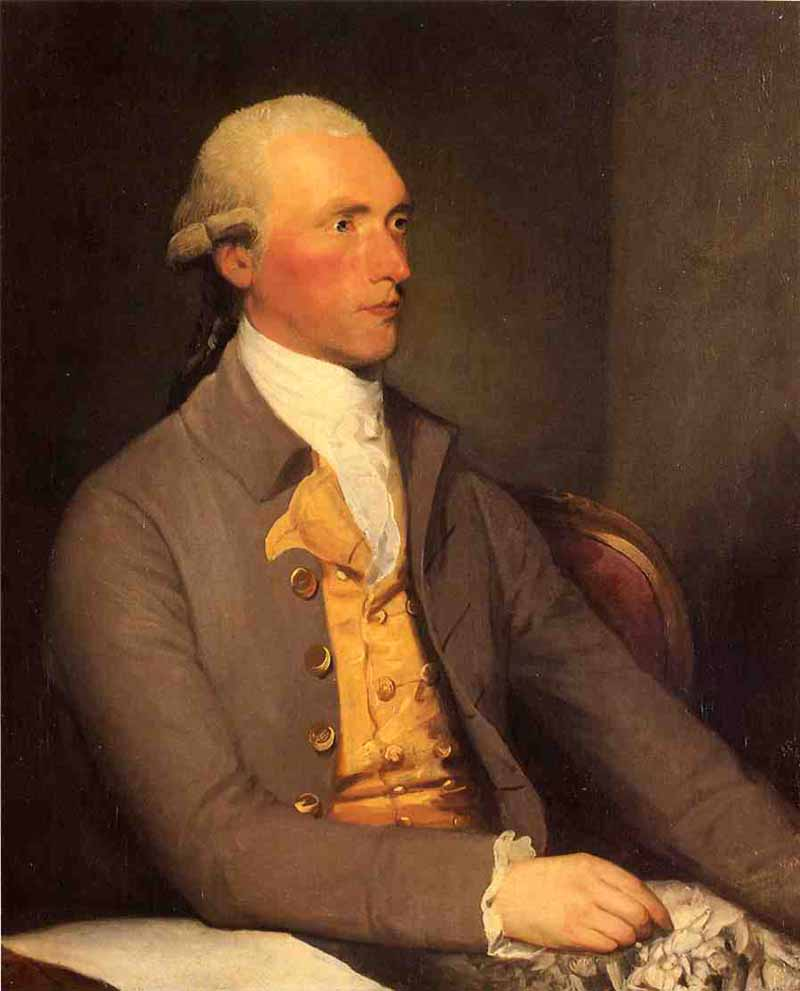
- portrait by Gilbert Stuart
- Born: 1750; Regensburg, Holy Roman Empire
- Died: in or before 1813; London, England
- Occupation: cartographer

Georg Siegmund Facius (ca. 1750 – in or before 1813) was cartographer and painter. He was a brother of the engraver Johann Gottlieb Facius.

The Facius brothers were born in Regensburg, Holy Roman Empire and received engraving training in Brussels. By 1776, their works were already well known and they moved to London at the invitation of John Boydell, with whom they worked for many years.
