= Thomas Hele (biochemist) =

British academic (1881–1953)

Professor Thomas Hele OBE FRCP

Vice-Chancellor of the University of Cambridge
- In office 1943–1945

Master of Emmanuel College, Cambridge
- In office 1935–1951

Personal details
- Born: Thomas Shirley Hele; 24 October 1881
- Died: 23 January 1953 (aged 71)

Thomas Shirley Hele (24 October 1881 – 23 January 1953) was a British academic.

Hele was educated at Carlisle Grammar School; Sedbergh School; Emmanuel College, Cambridge (Fellow, 1911); and Barts. He was University Lecturer in Biochemistry from 1921; Tutor at Emmanuel from 1922 to 1935; its Master from 1935 to 1951; and Vice-Chancellor of the University of Cambridge from 1943 to 1945.
