= Emmanuel College, Cambridge =

College of the University of Cambridge

Emmanuel College
- University of Cambridge
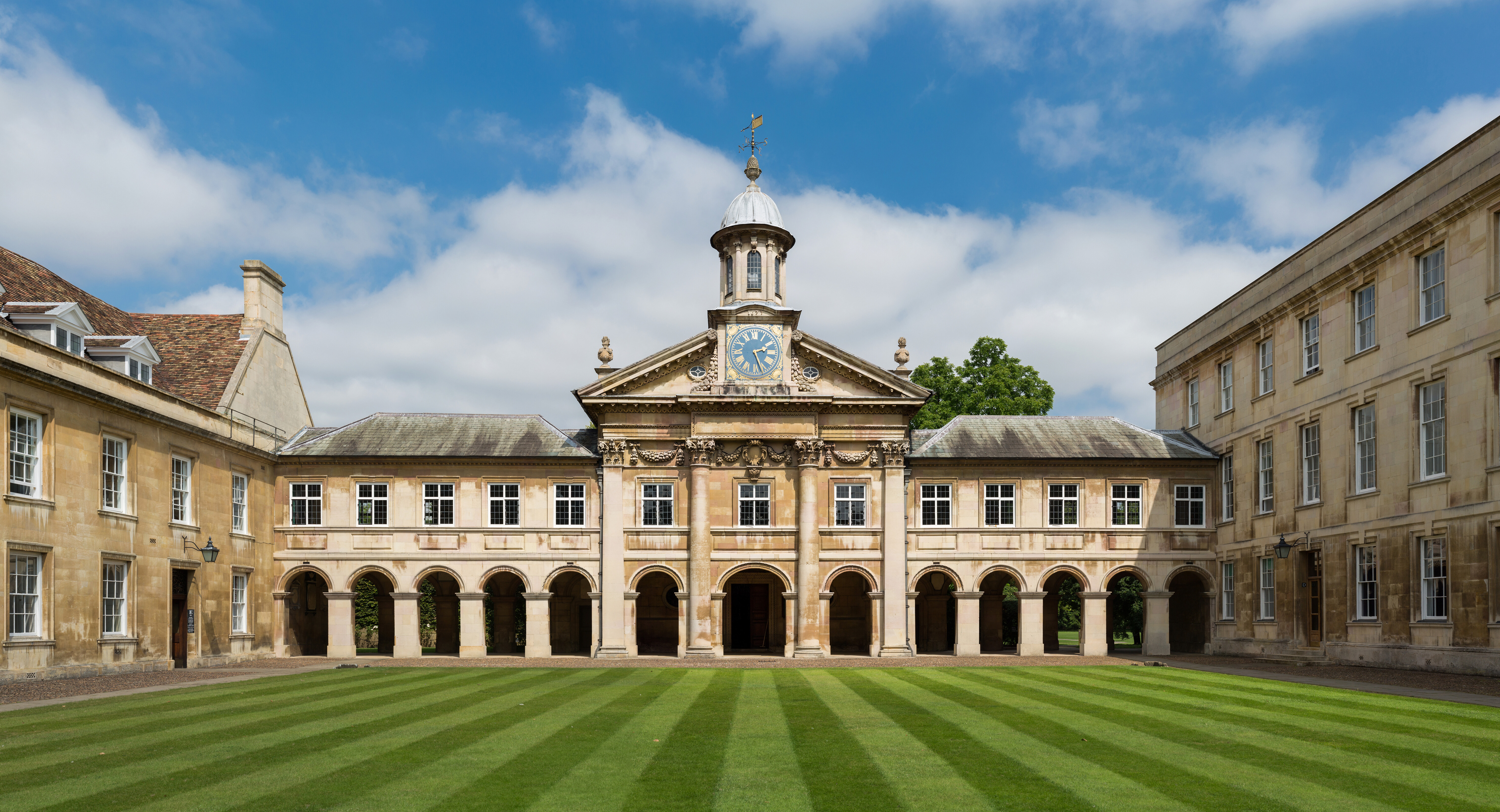
- Front Court, Emmanuel College

- Arms: Argent, a lion rampant azure, armed and langued gules, holding in the dexter forepaw a laurel wreath proper, in the mouth a scroll [of the second] inscribed EMMANUEL in letters Or.
Scarf colours: navy, with two equally-spaced narrow rose pink stripes
- Location: St Andrew's Street, Cambridge CB2 3AP (map)
- Coordinates: 52°12′13″N 0°07′28″E
- Full name: Emmanuel College in the University of Cambridge
- Latin name: Collegium Emanuelis
- Abbreviation: EM
- Founder: Sir Walter Mildmay
- Established: 1584 (442 years ago)
- Named after: Jesus of Nazareth (Emmanuel)
- Sister colleges: Exeter College, Oxford; Eliot House, Harvard; Saybrook College, Yale
- Master: Douglas Chalmers
- Undergraduates: 515 (2022-23)
- Postgraduates: 223 (2022-23)
- Endowment: £154M (2024)
- Visitor: Vice-Chancellor of the University ex officio
- Website: www.emma.cam.ac.uk
- ECSU: www.ecsu.org.uk
- MCR: www.emmamcr.org.uk
- Boat club: Emmanuel Boat Club

Map
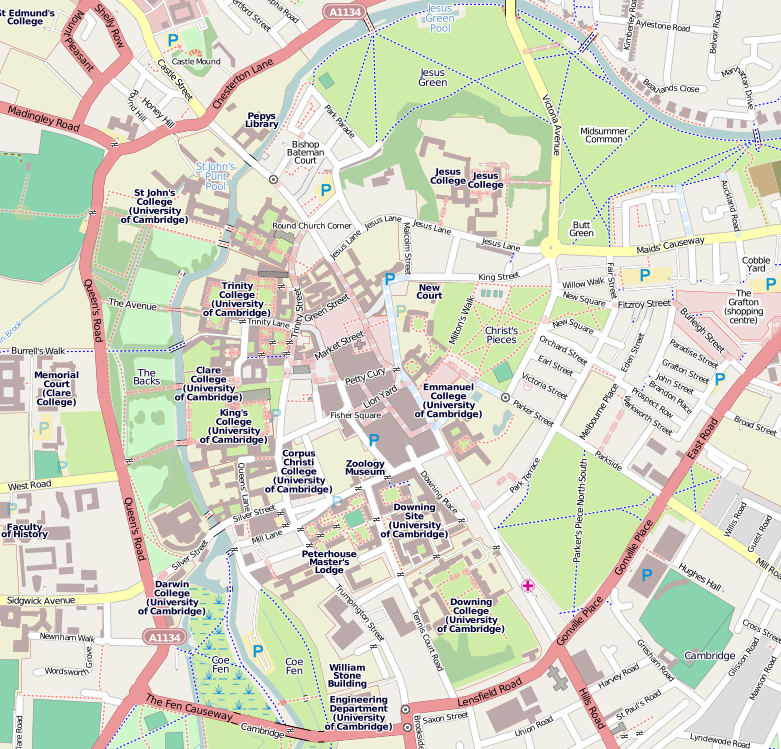
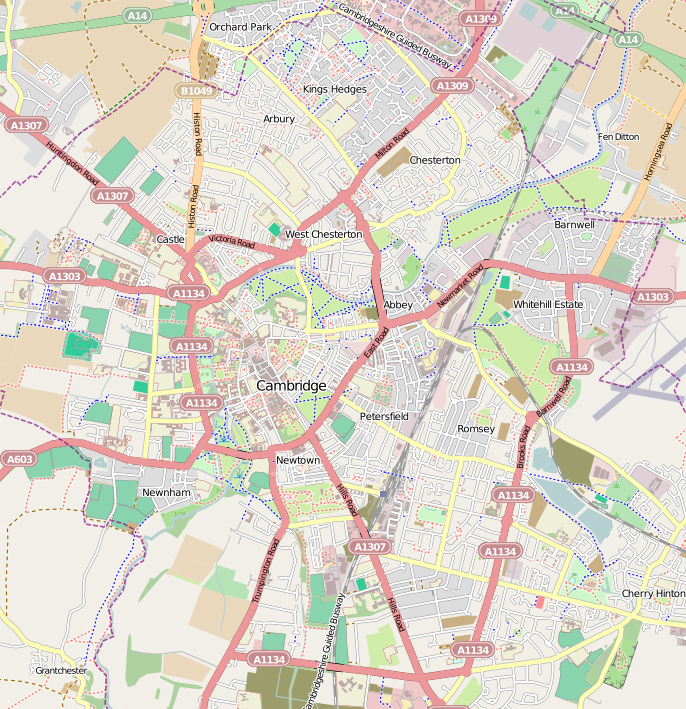
- Location within Central Cambridge Location within Cambridge

Emmanuel College is a constituent college of the University of Cambridge. The college was founded in 1584 by Sir Walter Mildmay, Chancellor of the Exchequer to Elizabeth I. The site on which the college sits was once Cambridge Blackfriars, a priory for Dominican monks, and the College Hall is built on the foundations of the monastery's nave. Emmanuel is one of the 16 "old colleges", which were founded before the 17th century.

Emmanuel today is one of the larger Cambridge colleges; it has around 500 undergraduates, reading almost every subject taught within the University, and around 200 postgraduates. Among Emmanuel's notable alumni are Thomas Young, John Harvard, Graham Chapman and Sebastian Faulks. Three members of Emmanuel College have received Nobel Prizes: Ronald Norrish, George Porter (both Chemistry, 1967) and Frederick Hopkins (Medicine, 1929).

In every year from 1998 until 2016, Emmanuel was among the top five colleges in the Tompkins Table, which ranks colleges according to end-of-year examination results. Emmanuel topped the table five times (2003, 2004, 2006, 2007 and 2010) and placed second six times (2001, 2002, 2008, 2009, 2011 and 2012). Its mean score for 1997–2025 inclusive places it as the second-highest-ranking college after Trinity.

== History ==
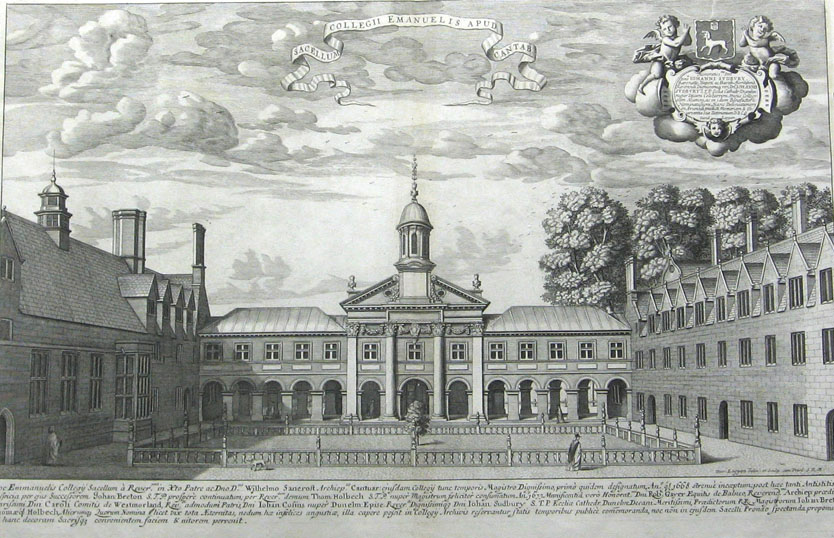
A 1690 illustration of Emmanuel by David Loggan

The college was founded in 1584 by Sir Walter Mildmay, Chancellor of the Exchequer to Elizabeth I. The site had been occupied by Cambridge Blackfriars, a Dominican friary, until the Dissolution of the Monasteries 45 years earlier, after which the Vice-Chancellor petitioned that the place be given over to the University; his request was refused. After passing through several hands, the former monastery was purchased for £550 to be the site of the new college in June 1583 by Laurence Chaderton, the Master-elect, and his brother-in-law, Richard Culverwell, acting on behalf of Mildmay, to whom they conveyed the property on 23 November 1583. Mildmay's foundation made use of the existing buildings. The architect was Ralph Symons, and in 1588 the new building was opened with a dedication festival, which Mildmay attended.

Mildmay, a Puritan, intended Emmanuel to be a centre for the training of Anglican preachers. According to Thomas Fuller, Mildmay, on coming to court after the college was opened, was addressed by the Queen with the words: "Sir Walter, I hear you have erected a puritan foundation", to which Mildmay replied: "No, madam; far be it from me to countenance anything contrary to your established laws; but I have set an acorn, which when it becomes an oak, God alone knows what will be the fruit thereof".

Like all the older Cambridge colleges, Emmanuel originally took only male students. It first admitted female students in 1979.

== Buildings and grounds ==
Under Mildmay's instructions the chapel of the original Dominican Friary was converted into the College's dining hall and the friars' dining hall became a chapel. In the late 17th century the College commissioned a new chapel, one of the three buildings in Cambridge designed by Christopher Wren (1677). After Wren's construction was opened the old chapel became the College library until it outgrew the space. The library moved to its present space in 1930, occupying a large building in South Court completed in 1911 and initially used as lecture rooms. The library was extended in 1974.

There is a large fish pond in the grounds, part of the legacy of the friary. The pond is home to a colony of ducks.

The Fellows' Garden contains a swimming pool that was the friars' bathing pool, making it one of the oldest bathing pools in Europe and allegedly the oldest outdoor pool in continuous use in the UK. The Garden also contains an Oriental plane tree that is reputed to have lived far longer than is typical for the species.

It has been claimed that the college has the only privately owned subway (underpass) in the UK, connecting the main site to North Court, but in fact Oriel College, Oxford, has its own tunnel beneath Oriel Street linking the Island Site with the main college buildings. The Bodleian Library in Oxford also has its own tunnel beneath Broad Street.

=== Queen's Building ===
The Queen's Building encompasses a 150-seat theatre, reception and seminar rooms, and facilities for music practice. The theatre inside the Queen's Building is frequently utilized by the College for various purposes, such as lectures, Music Society concerts, admissions open day talks, and is a conference venue. Designed by the architects Sir Michael and Patty Hopkins, the Queen's Building is constructed using Ketton stone. The architectural design combines the robustness of the stone exterior walls with the spanning capabilities and mass of concrete for the floors. The limestone exterior is load bearing, and is the first building to use post-tensioned stone with internal cables. The roof is adorned with lead, and American white oak is extensively incorporated into the roof and panelling. The building was inaugurated in 1995.

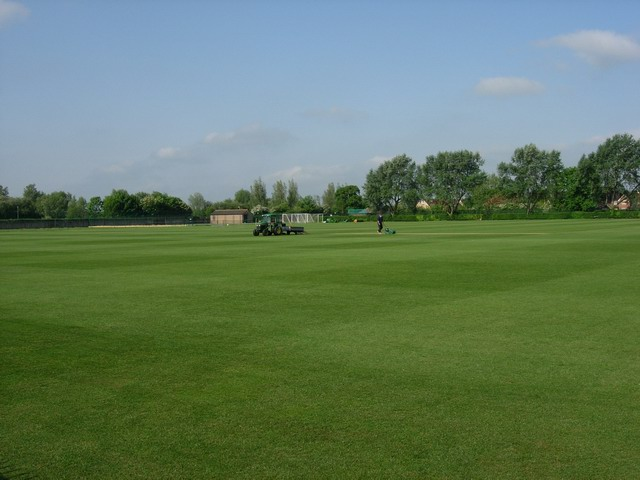
College sports grounds

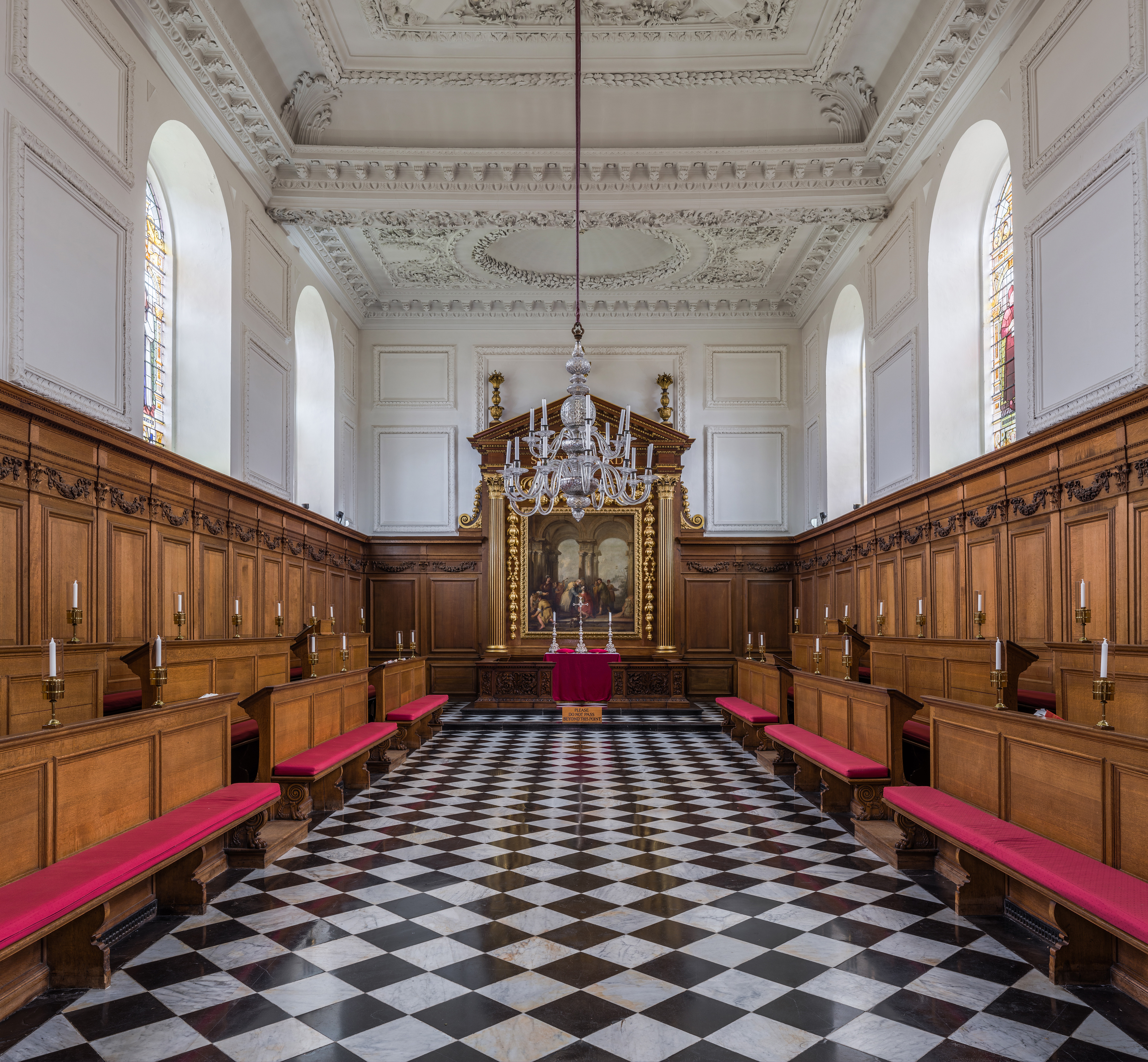
The chapel looking towards the altar

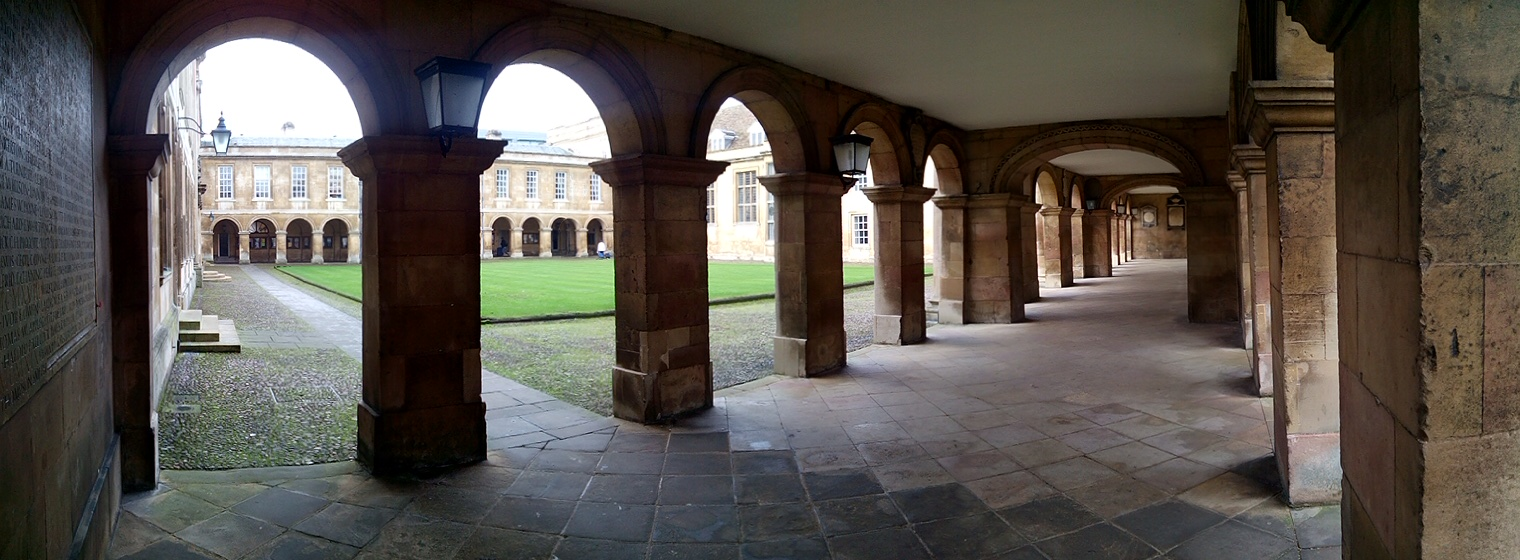
Chapel cloisters

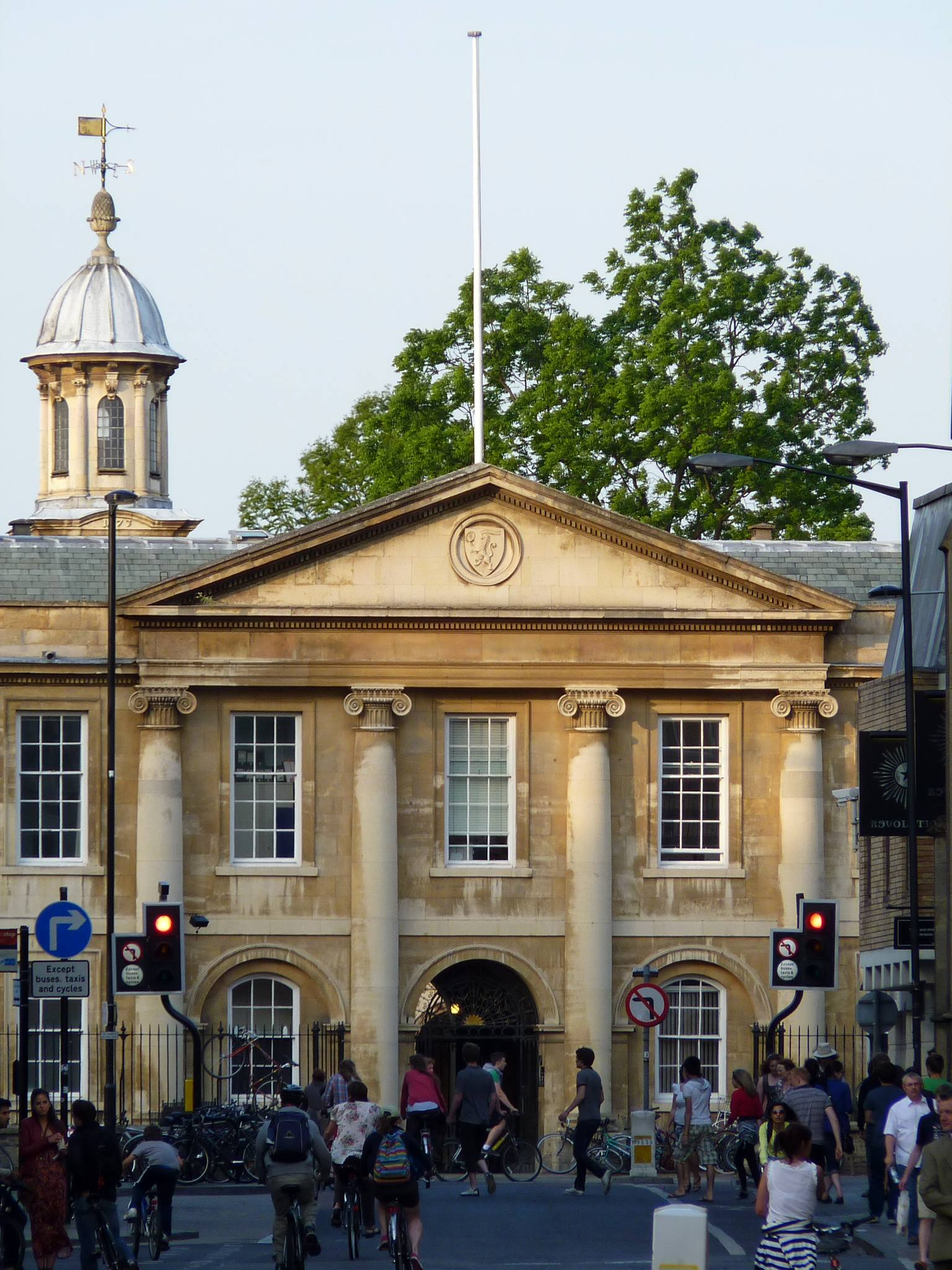
Front façade from Downing Street

== Student life ==
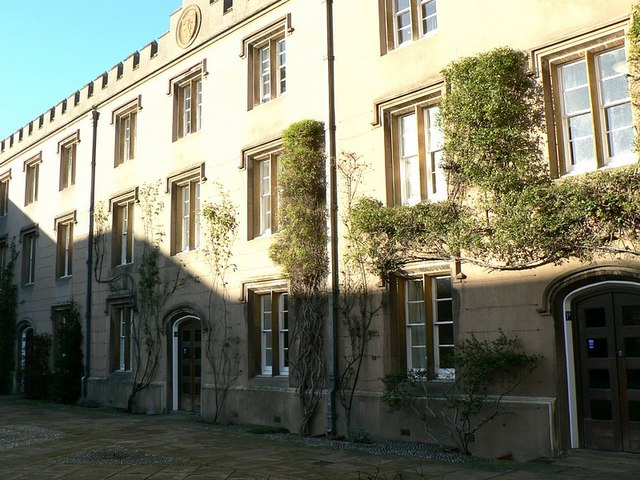
New Court which was built in 1824–25

The Emmanuel College Students Union (ECSU) is the society of all undergraduate students at Emmanuel College. It provides a shop, a bar, a common room, and funding for sports and other societies. ECSU's Executive Committee is elected at the end of Michaelmas Term each year. The ECSU committee is staffed by undergraduates and holds such positions as President, Welfare Officer, and Ents Officer amongst others.

The Emmanuel College Middle Combination Room (Emma MCR) is the society of all postgraduate students at Emmanuel College. The Room itself is a comfortable and well-equipped space in Furness Lodge. The MCR committee organises regular social events for graduate students, including well-attended formal dinners in hall every few weeks.

=== Sports and societies ===
There are numerous student societies and sports clubs at Emmanuel College. Sports clubs include tennis, badminton, cricket, squash, rugby, football, hockey and netball. Societies include the Emmanuel College Music Society (ECMS), the Christian Union, the Mountaineering Society, the Emmanuel Vegan Society, the Politics and Economics Society, ROAR (the college satirical newspaper), and the Emmanuel College Board Games Society. Funding for societies comes from the Emmanuel College Students Union (ECSU).

== People associated with Emmanuel ==
=== Former students ===
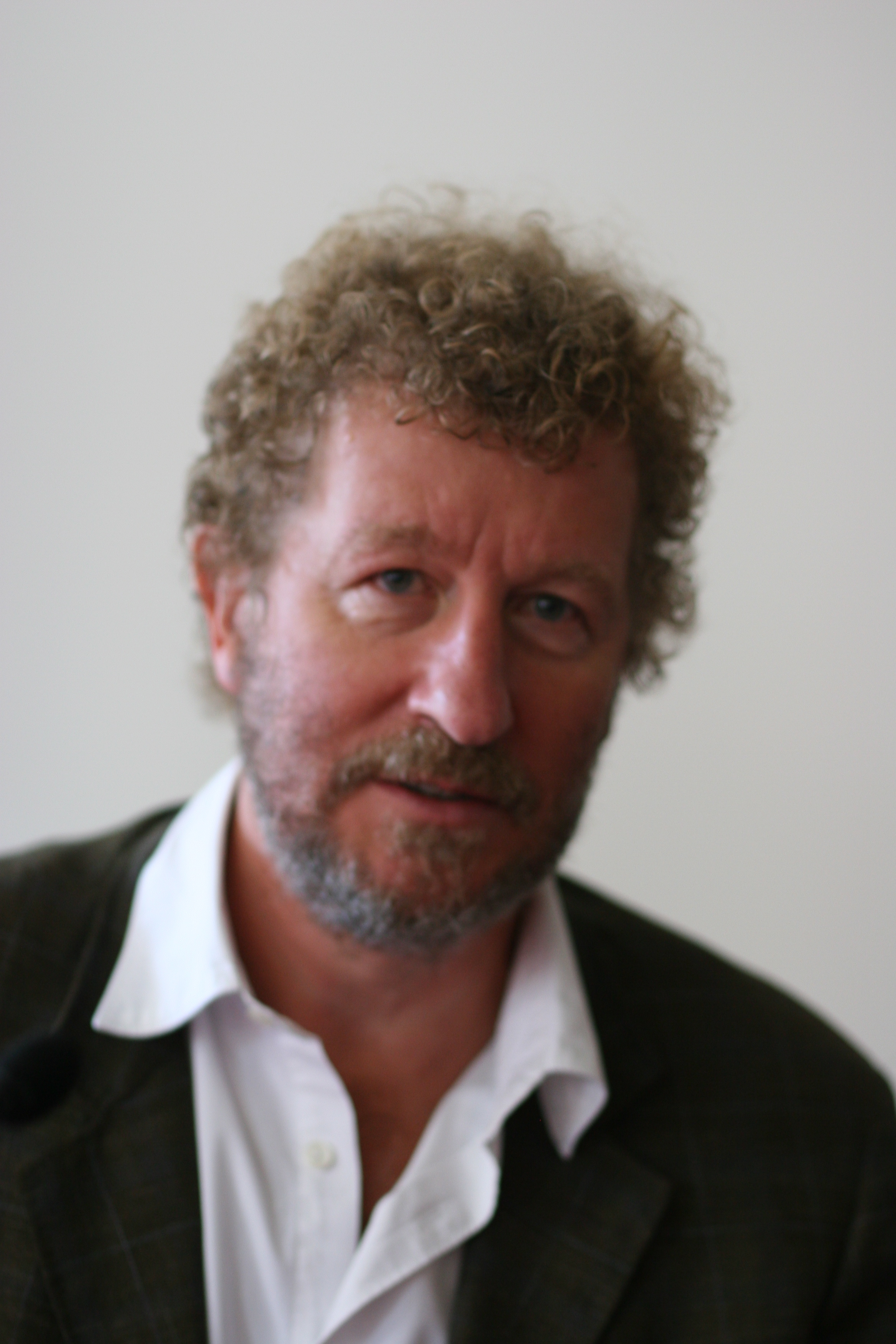
Sebastian Faulks, novelist

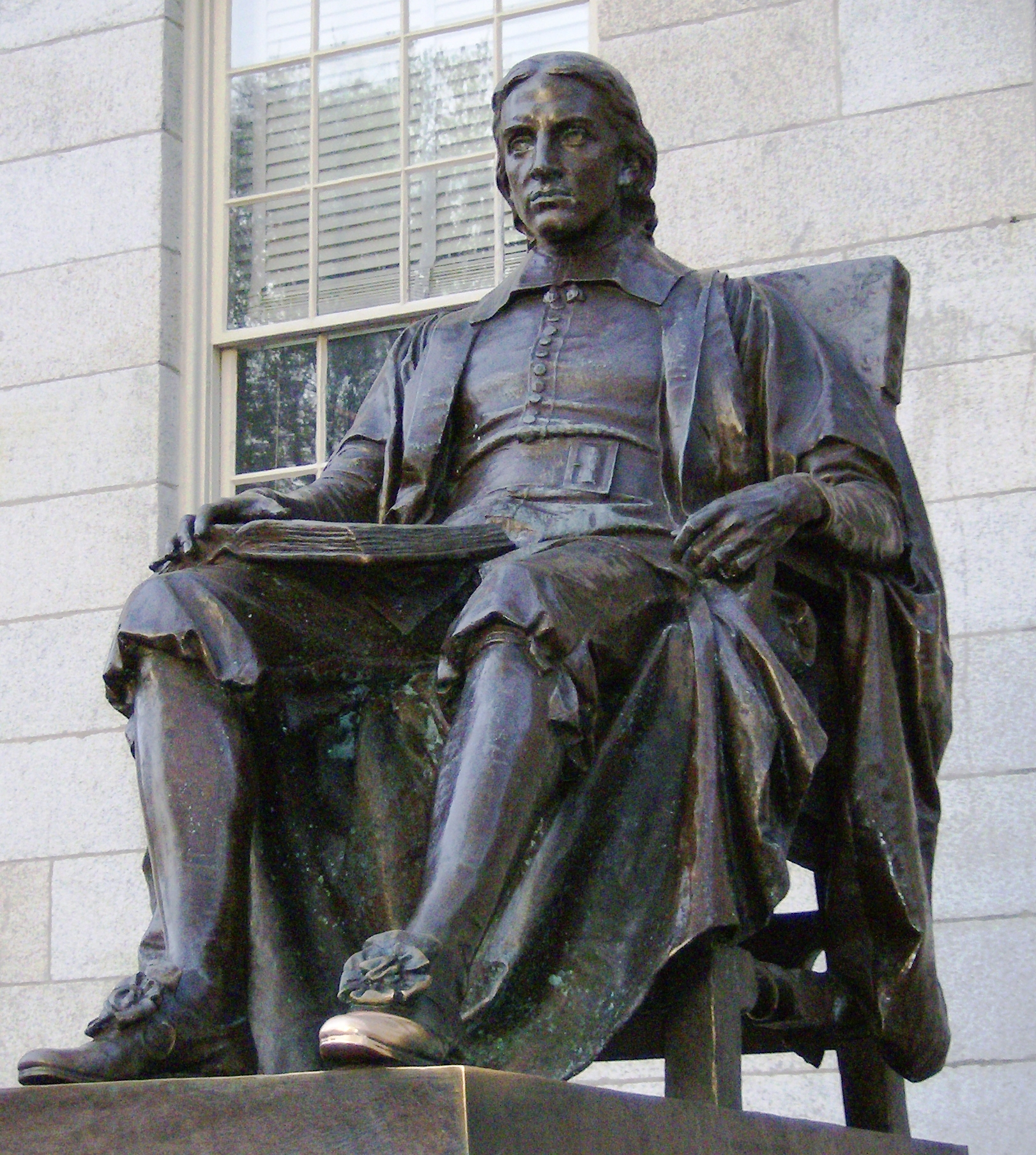
John Harvard, namesake of Harvard University

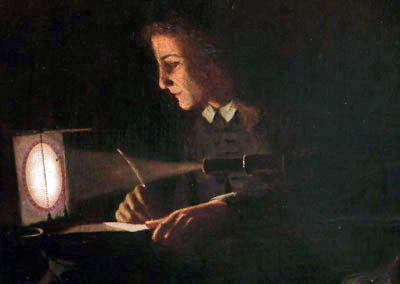
Jeremiah Horrocks, astronomer

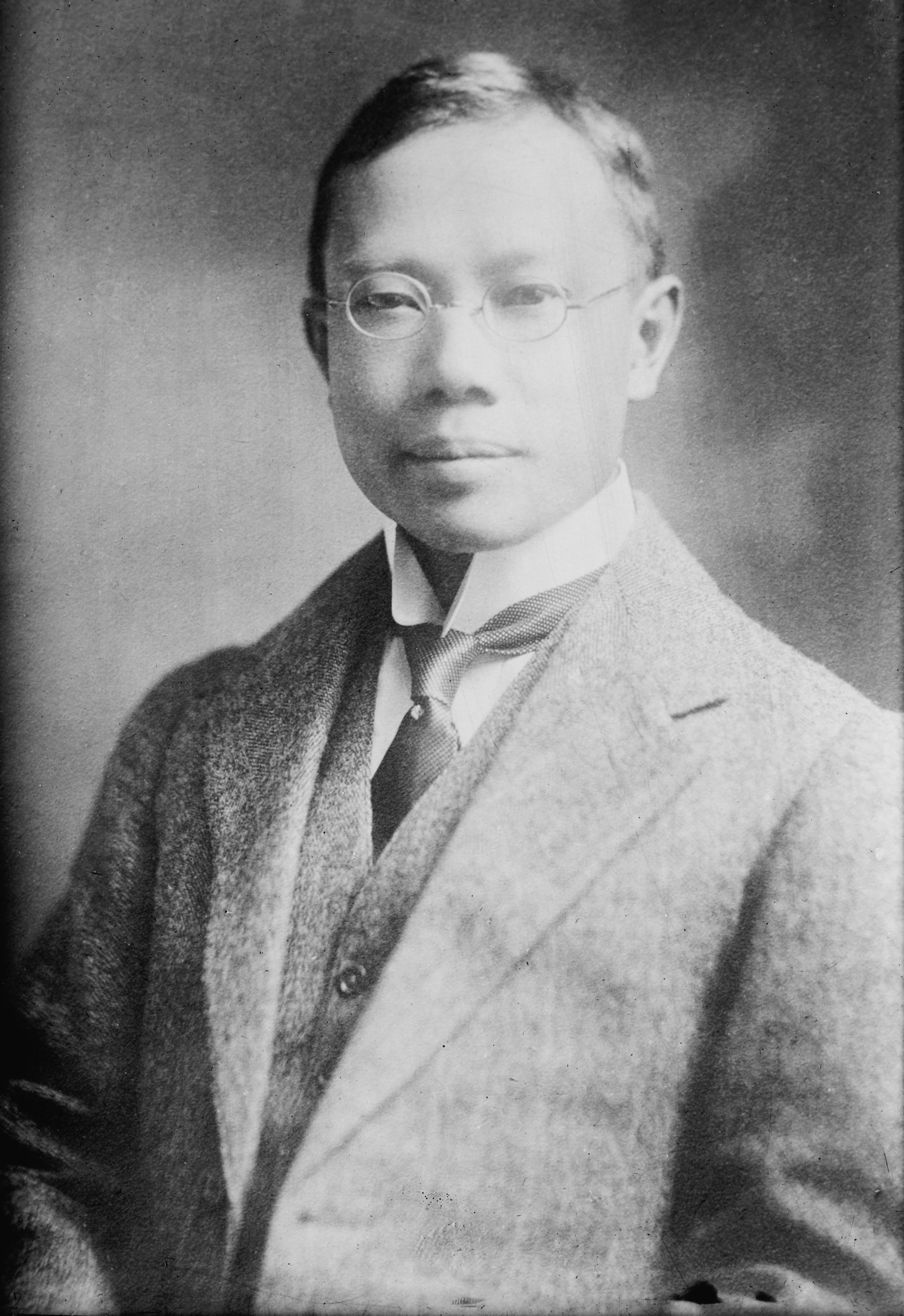
Wu Lien-teh, physician

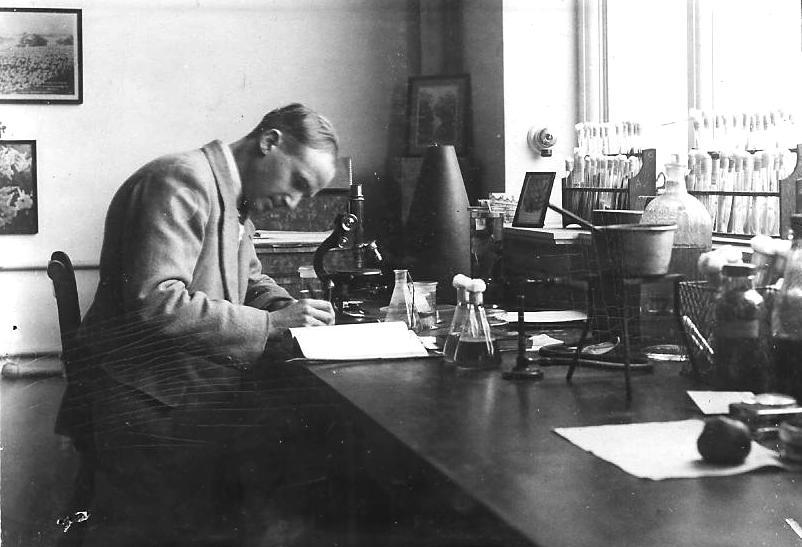
Lawrence Ogilvie, plant pathologist

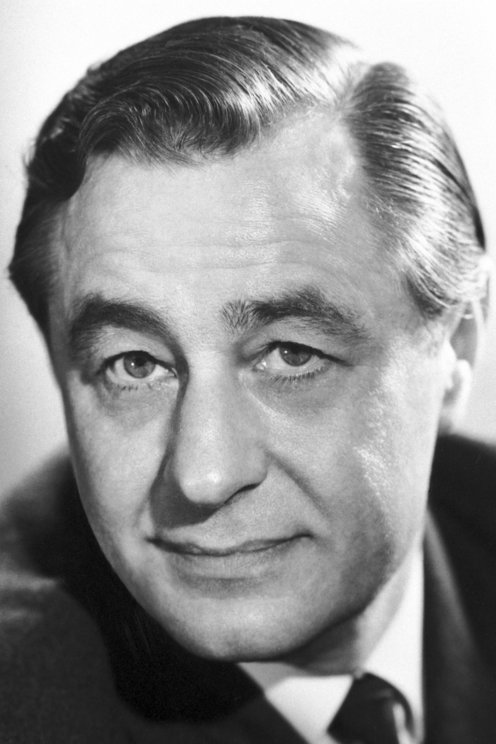
George Porter, Nobel Laureate in Chemistry

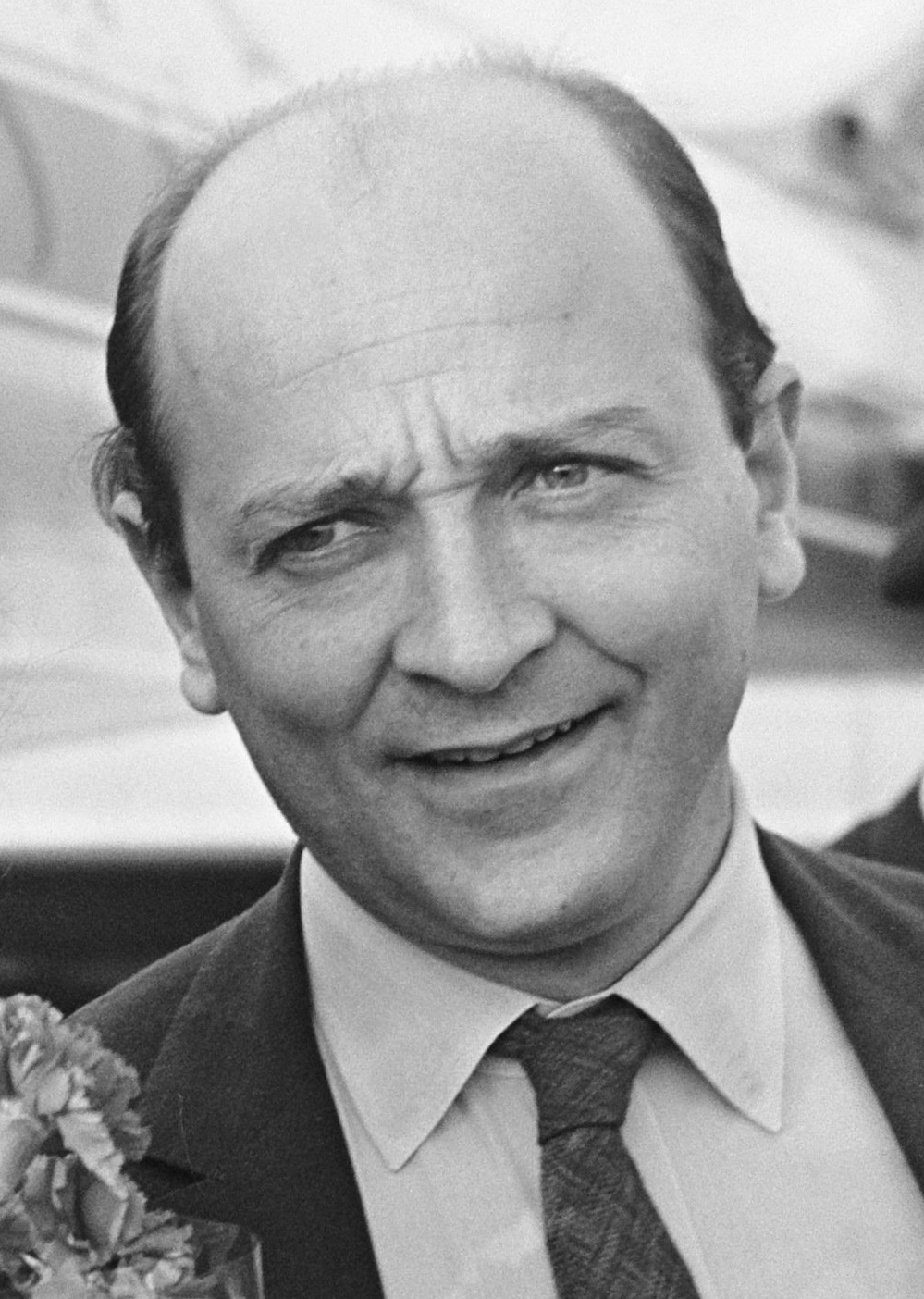
Karel Reisz, filmmaker

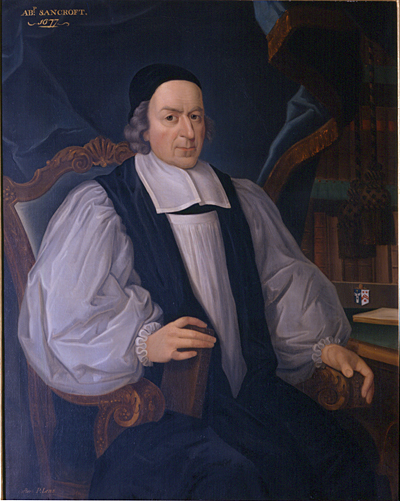
William Sancroft, Archbishop of Canterbury

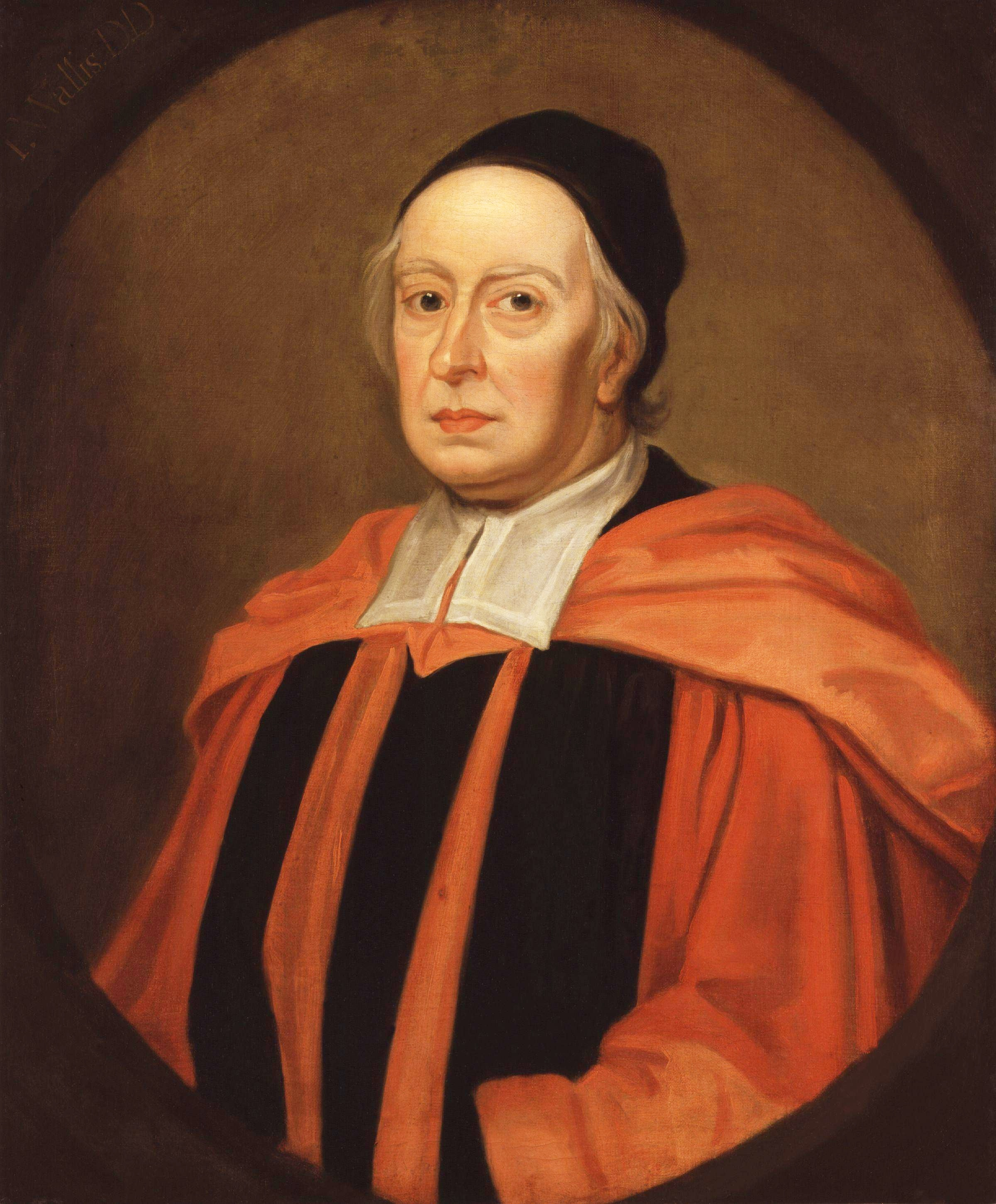
John Wallis, mathematician, invented the infinity symbol ($\infty$)

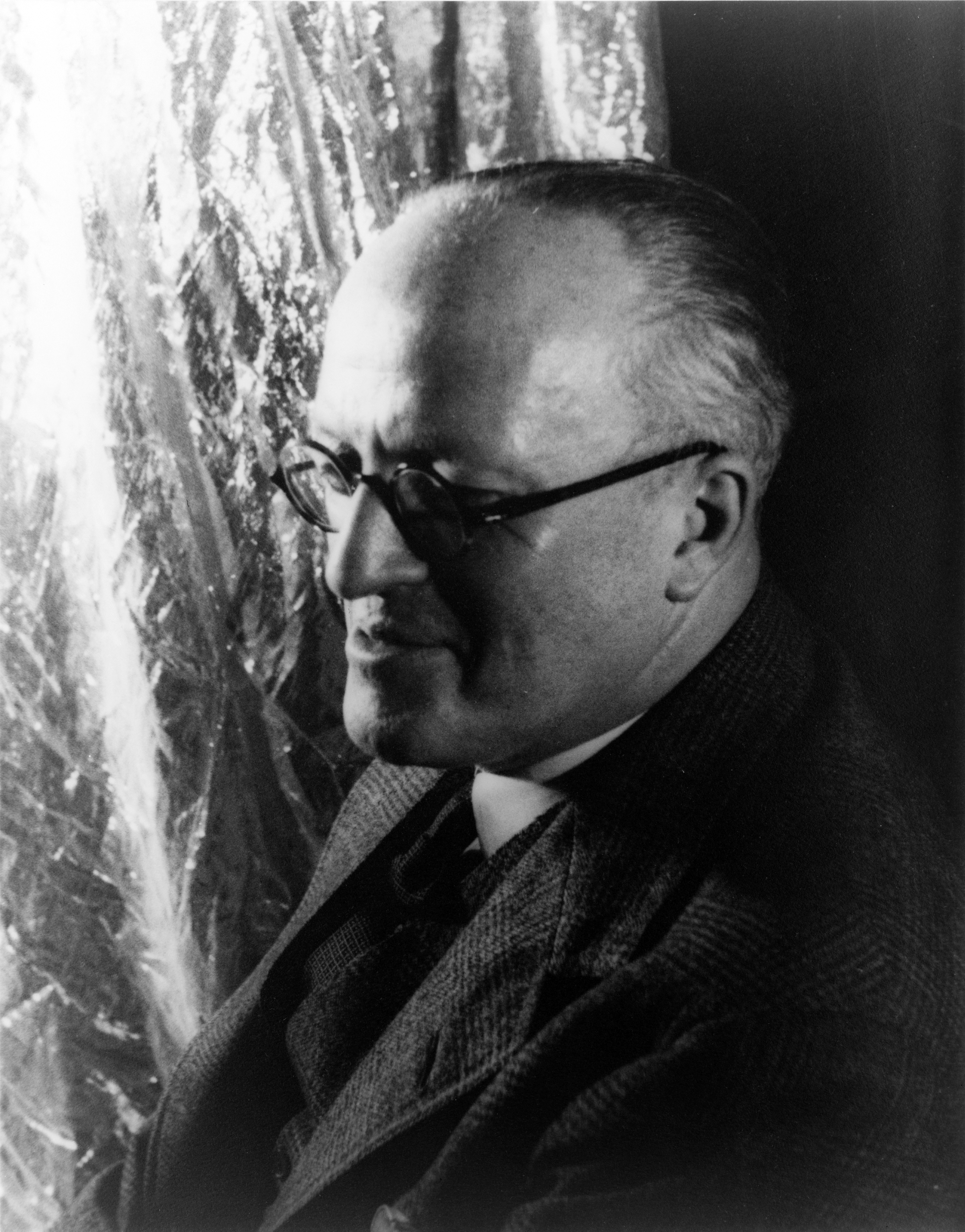
Hugh Walpole, novelist

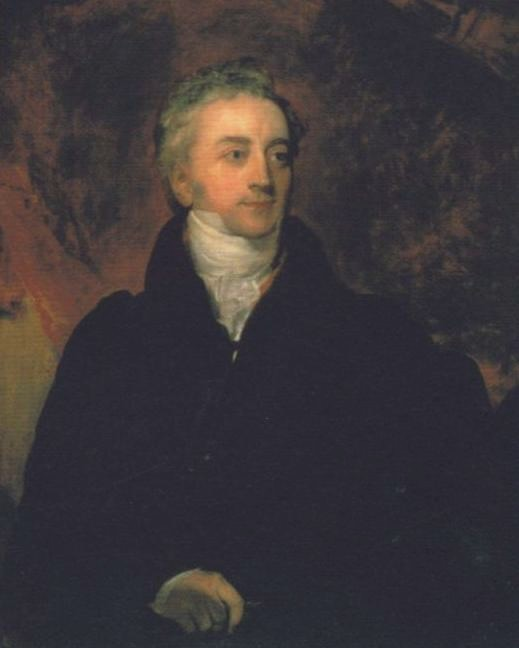
Thomas Young, scientist and polymath

Emmanuel graduates were prominently involved in the settling of British colonies in North America. Of the first 100 university graduates in New England, one third were graduates of Emmanuel. Harvard University, the first college in the United States, was organised on the model of Emmanuel as it was then run. Harvard is named for John Harvard (BA, 1632), an Emmanuel graduate. Emmanuel and Harvard maintain relations via student exchanges such as the Herchel Smith scholarships, the Harvard Scholarship, the Paul Williams Scholarship, and the Gomes lecture and dinner held each February at Emmanuel in honour of Peter Gomes, erstwhile minister at Harvard's Memorial Church.

Early Emmanuel graduates included several translators of the 1611 Authorised Version of the Bible, for example Laurence Chaderton and William Branthwaite.

Fictional characters who have been said to have gone to Emmanuel include Jonathan Swift's Lemuel Gulliver. It is implied that Sebastian Faulks's eponymous Engleby and Thomas Richardson also matriculated at Emmanuel. The protagonist in Samuel Butler's novel The Way of All Flesh also went to Emmanuel. The uncompleted Doctor Who serial Shada was partly filmed in the college, with the character Professor Chronotis having rooms in New Court.

== Grace ==
=== College grace ===
The Latin grace (Oratio Ante Cibum) is recited before formal dinners at Emmanuel College.
Latin	English
Oculi omnium in te sperant, Domine, et tu das escam illorum in tempore opportuno. Aperis tu manum tuam et imples omne animal benedictione. Benedic, Domine, nos et dona tua quae de tua largitate sumus sumpturi; per Christum Dominum nostrum. Amen.	The eyes of all wait upon thee, O Lord, and thou givest them their meat in due season. Thou openest thy hand and fillest every living thing with blessing. Bless us, O Lord and these thy gifts which of thy bounty we are about to receive; through Christ our Lord. Amen
The Oratio Post Cibum is sometimes read after dinner:
Latin	English
Confiteantur tibi, Domine, omnia opera tua, et sancti tui benedicant te. Agimus tibi gratias, omnipotens Deus, pro universis beneficiis tuis, qui vivis et regnas Deus per omnia saecula saeculorum. Amen.	Let them acknowledge to you, O Lord, all thy works, and let thy saints bless thee. We give thanks to thee, almighty God, for all thy goodness, who livest and reignest as God for ever and ever. Amen.

== See also ==
- List of Organ Scholars
- List of Masters of Emmanuel College
- Listed buildings in Cambridge (west)
