= David Wood =

David Wood may refer to:

== Entertainment ==
- David Duffield Wood (1838–1910), American composer, educator, and musician
- David Wood (actor) (born 1944), English actor and playwright
- David Wood (New Zealand musician), musician with Straitjacket Fits
- David Wood (Canadian musician), guitarist of Canadian indie rock band Good Kid

== Politics ==
- David Wood (politician) (born 1961), member of the Missouri House of Representatives
- David Wood (environmental campaigner) (1963–2006), executive director of the GrassRoots Recycling Network

== Sports ==
- David Wood (basketball) (born 1964), American professional basketball player
- David Wood (cricketer) (born 1965), English cricketer

== Other ==
- David Wood (British Army officer) (1923–2009), British Army officer
- David Wood (journalist), American journalist
- David Wood (judge) (born 1948), British judge
- David Wood (mathematician) (born 1971), Australian mathematician
- David Wood (philosopher) (born 1946), professor of philosophy at Vanderbilt University
- David Leonard Wood (born 1957), American serial killer
- David Muir Wood (born 1949), author
- David Wood (Christian apologist) (born 1976), American YouTuber and evangelical apologist

== See also ==
- David Woods (disambiguation)
- List of people with surname Wood
