= Andrew N. Schofield =

British engineer (1930–2025)

Professor Andrew N. Schofield FRS FREng
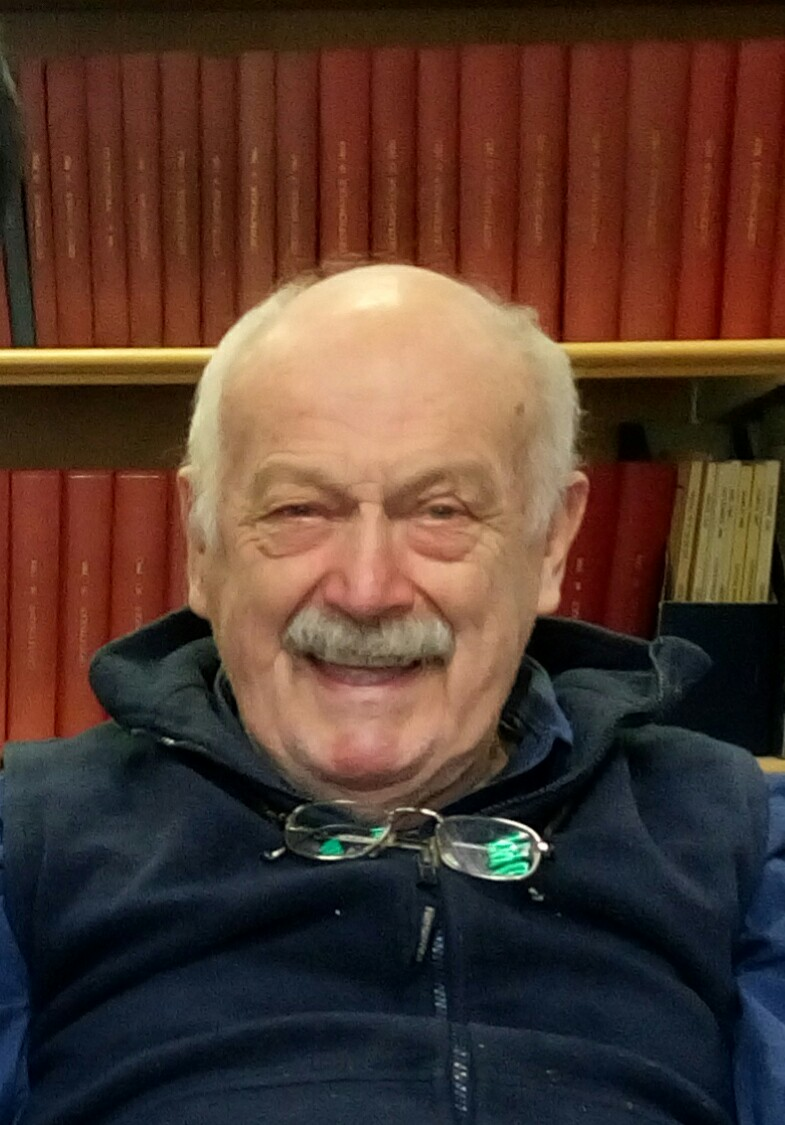
- Schofield in 2016
- Born: 1 November 1930; Cambridge, England
- Died: 27 January 2025 (aged 94)
- Education: Cambridge University, UK
- Known for: Critical state soil mechanics, Cam Clay, Geotechnical centrifuge modelling
- Spouse: Margaret Green (m.1961)
- Awards: US Army Distinguished Civilian Service Award, 1979; 20th Rankine Lecture, 1980; Fellow of the Royal Academy of Engineering, 1986; Fellow of the Royal Society, 1992; James Alfred Ewing Gold Medal from the Institution of Civil Engineers, 1993
- Scientific career
- Fields: Soil Mechanics, Geotechnical Engineering
- Workplaces: Cambridge University, UK; University of Manchester Institute of Science and Technology (UMIST)
- Thesis: The development of lateral force during the displacement of sand by the vertical face of a rotating model foundation (1960)
- Doctoral advisor: Kenneth H. Roscoe
- Notable students: Malcolm D. Bolton, Robert Mair, Sarah Springman

Andrew Noel Schofield (1 November 1930 – 27 January 2025) was a British soil mechanics engineer and an emeritus professor of geotechnical engineering at the University of Cambridge.

== Background ==
Schofield was born on 1 November 1930, the son of Rev John Noel Schofield and Winifred Jane Mary Eyles in Cambridge, England. He married Margaret Eileen Green in 1961. He retired from Cambridge University in 1997. Schofield died on 27 January 2025, at the age of 94.

== Career ==
Andrew Schofield studied engineering and graduated from Christ's College, Cambridge in 1951. He then worked in the Nyasaland Protectorate, Africa (now Malawi) office of Scott and Wilson Ltd. where he performed research on lateritic soils and low cost road construction. He returned to Cambridge University to work with Professor Kenneth H. Roscoe on his PhD, which he completed in 1961. He became an Assistant Lecturer in 1961 and a Fulbright Fellow and a California Institute of Technology Fellow in 1963/4. He was elected Fellow of Churchill College, Cambridge in 1964. He was elected as a Fellow of the Royal Academy of Engineering in 1986 and as a Fellow of the Royal Society in 1992.

With Ken Roscoe and Peter Wroth in 1958 he published "On the Yielding of Soils", which showed how plasticity theory and critical state soil mechanics could be used to describe the coupled volumetric and shear behavior of soils. This led to the development of a constitutive model known as 'Cam Clay' that was formalized in a text by Schofield and Wroth in 1968.

Schofield was influenced by work on geotechnical centrifuge modeling by G.I. Pokrovsky in the USSR to study geotechnical engineering and soil mechanics problems. He developed a prototype geotechnical centrifuge in Cambridge and later adapted a centrifuge in the English Electric Company in Luton, UK, to be used for geotechnical modelling in 1966.

He accepted a chair at the Institute of Science and Technology in Manchester (UMIST) in 1968 and developed a 1.5-m radius geotechnical centrifuge there. Following Roscoe's death in 1970, he returned to Cambridge in 1974 and was appointed a professor in the Cambridge University Engineering Department to lead the Soil Mechanics group. Working with the mechanical design engineer Phillip Turner, he developed a 5-m radius geotechnical centrifuge at Cambridge University that continues to be heavily used as of 2010. He was elected a Fellow of the Royal Society in 1992. Schofield retired from the university in 1997, but his continued work is evidenced by the publication of a book in 2005.

== Critique of The Mohr Coulomb equation as foundations in soil mechanics ==
By Professor Schofield the behaviour of remoulded soil (be it sand, silt or clay) is governed by friction and particle interlocking. By Professor Schofield, The Mohr Coulomb equation, popularised by Terzaghi, and underpinning developments in soil mechanics since the 1930s, is simply wrong. Terzaghi made soil mechanics a science, made a mistake when he said soil’s strength is provided by cohesion and friction.

== Major publications ==
- Roscoe, K. H.; Schofield, A. N.; Wroth, C. P. (1958), "On the Yielding of Soils", Geotechnique, vol. 8, pp. 22–53, doi:10.1680/geot.1958.8.1.22
- Schofield, A. N.; Wroth, C. P. (1968), Critical State Soil Mechanics, McGraw-Hill, p. 310, ISBN 978-0641940484
- Schofield, A. N. (2005), Disturbed soil properties and geotechnical design, Thomas Telford, p. 216, ISBN 978-0727729828
- Schofield, A. N. (1980), "Cambridge geotechnical centrifuge operations", Geotechnique, vol. 30, no. 3, pp. 227–268, doi:10.1680/geot.1980.30.3.227
