= John Burland =

British/South African Geotechnical Engineer and Professor of Soil Mechanics

John Burland CBE FRS FREng FGS FICE FIStructE
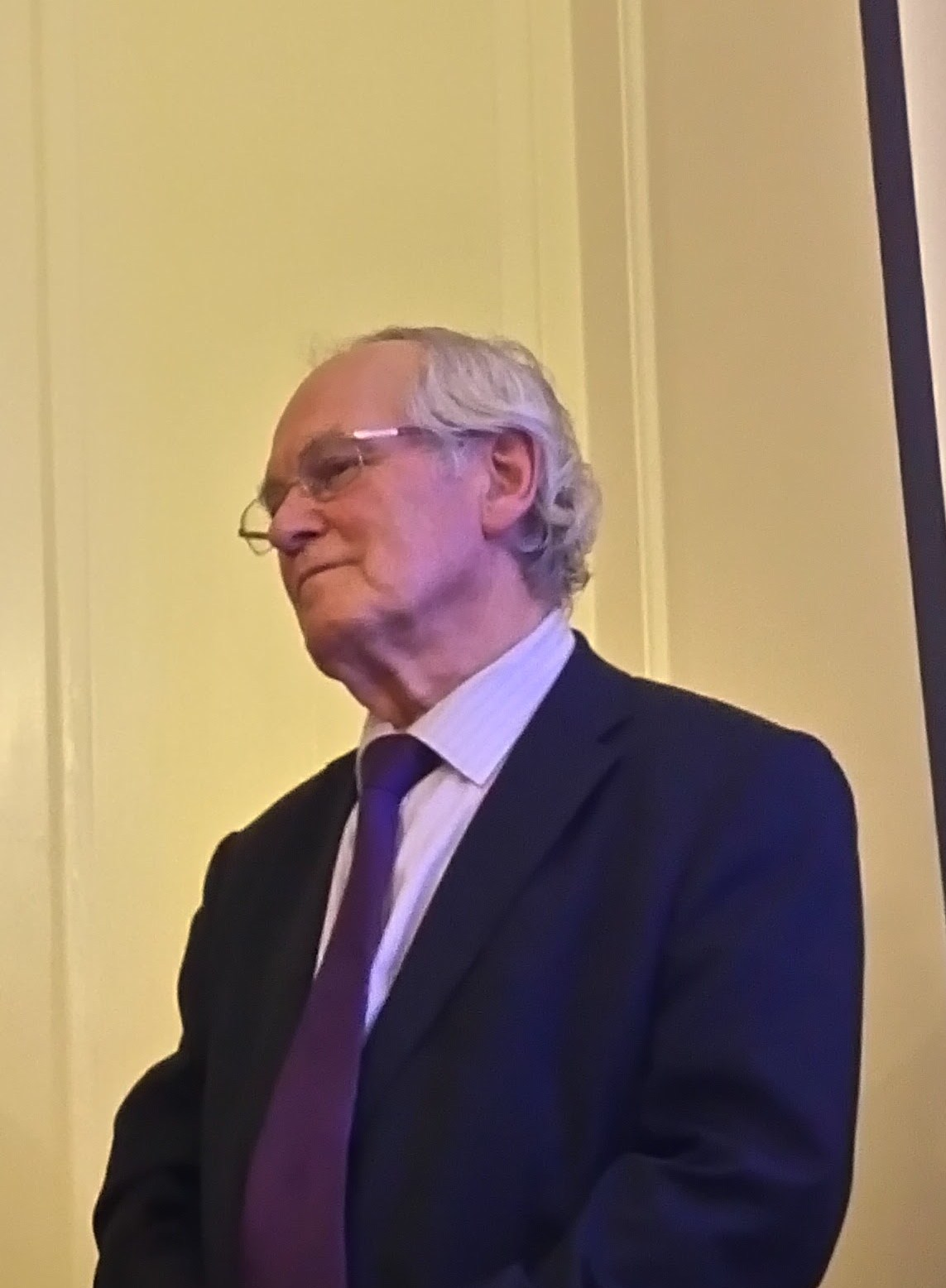
- John Burland in Cambridge, 2016
- Born: 4 March 1936 (age 90); Buckinghamshire, England
- Education: Witwatersrand University; University of Cambridge
- Known for: Development of Critical state theory of soil mechanics Stabilisation of the Leaning Tower of Pisa
- Scientific career
- Fields: Civil Engineering; Soil Mechanics; Geotechnical Engineering
- Workplaces: Ove Arup & Partners
- Thesis: Deformation of soft clay (1967)
- Doctoral advisor: Kenneth H. Roscoe

John Boscawen Burland (born 4 March 1936) is a geotechnical engineer, Emeritus Professor and Senior Research Investigator at the Department of Civil and Environmental Engineering of Imperial College London, and a noted expert in the field of soil mechanics.

In 2016, Burland was elected as a member of the National Academy of Engineering for contributions to geotechnical engineering and the design, construction, and preservation of civil infrastructure and heritage buildings.

== Early life and education ==
John Burland was born in Buckinghamshire in 1936, but moved to South Africa as a child. He attended Parktown Boys' High School and then received a First Class Honours BSc degree in civil engineering from the University of the Witwatersrand in 1959, followed by an MSc.

His MSc work led to the publication in of a landmark technical paper in Géotechnique, co-authored with his supervising professor Jeremiah Jennings. Burland's findings showed that the conventional approach of using effective stress to predict soil behaviour required adjustment for partly saturated conditions. The paper challenged the universality of the effective stress principle by demonstrating that its predictive accuracy diminishes under conditions of partial soil saturation, which led to a re-evaluation of some foundational concepts in soil mechanics.

Burland returned to England in 1961 and took up a position with Ove Arup & Partners in London, where he provided soil mechanics expertise for the design of what was then London’s tallest building, BP’s Britannic House headquarters in Moorgate.

In 1963, Burland commenced a PhD at the University of Cambridge under the supervision of professor Kenneth H. Roscoe. He published his thesis, Deformation of soft clay, in 1967.

== Career and achievements ==
Burland joined the Building Research Station in 1966, becoming Head of the Geotechnics Division in 1972 and Assistant Director in 1979.

In 1980 he was appointed to the Chair of Soil Mechanics at Imperial College London, where he served for over 20 years and was Head of the Geotechnics Section. His move to Imperial gave him the chance to collaborate with Alec Skempton. Holding Skempton in high regard, Burland paid homage by christening Skempton’s former office with a sign that read “Skem’s Room” after he was given the room on Skempton’s retirement. Burland also undertook lectures at several universities and institutions, including his alma mater, Witwatersrand.

He received media attention in the 1990s and early 2000s as one of the engineers who supervised the soil extraction work which stabilised the Leaning Tower of Pisa. In recognition of this, he was awarded the Knight Commander of the Royal Order of Francis I of the Two Sicilies by the Duke of Castro in November 2001, and awarded the Commendatore of the Order of the Star of Italian Solidarity (OSSI) by Carlo Azeglio Ciampi in 2003.

Burland was involved in ensuring that the Houses of Parliament and Big Ben were unharmed by the extension of the London Underground Jubilee line. He worked on the construction of a large underground car park at the Palace of Westminster and the stabilising of the Metropolitan Cathedral of Mexico City.

=== The Leaning Tower of Pisa Stabilisation Project, 1990 - 2001 ===
After the collapse of the Civic Tower in Pavia in 1989, which killed four people, the stability of the tower at Pisa was widely questioned. In March 1990, Burland was asked by the Government of Italy to be part of a 14-member committee charged with stabilising the Leaning Tower of Pisa. With direct involvement in the project over 11 years, Burland made significant contributions to the work, which involved an innovative approach to counteract the tower's precarious lean. The project aimed to ensure the long-term stability of the historic structure without compromising its integrity.

Burland and his team faced numerous challenges, including understanding the complex soil mechanics and historical construction techniques of the tower. The tower, resting on weak, highly compressible soils, has increasingly leaned over the centuries, reaching a state of leaning instability which by the late 20th century had threatened to cause a collapse. Burland concluded that any attempt to disturb or strengthen the ground on the south side, such as through underpinning or grouting, would be extremely hazardous due to the tower's precarious condition and the high stress on its masonry, risking collapse.

In line with international conservation standards for valuable historic monuments, any interventions needed to minimally impact its integrity, preserving its history, and craftsmanship, with little to no visible changes. Burland's approach included both temporary and permanent stabilisation measures. Initially, temporary stabilisation was achieved by applying 900 tonnes of lead weights on the north side of the foundations, using a post-tensioned concrete ring. This method, and accurate prediction of tower behaviour using numerical models, was crucial in stabilising the tower while permanent solutions were developed. The permanent solution aimed to reduce the tower's inclination by about 10 per cent, a strategy expected to significantly prolong the tower's lifespan without invasive actions like propping or underpinning.

The soil extraction process used in the Leaning Tower of Pisa project was a pivotal aspect of the stabilisation work. This technique involved the careful removal of soil from beneath the north side of the tower's foundations. This strategic extraction allowed for a controlled and gradual reduction of the tower's lean, reducing stress on the masonry and enhancing the structure's stability. Burland's implementation of this method was crucial in achieving the desired reduction in the tower's inclination without invasive structural interventions.

=== Underground Car Park at the Houses of Parliament, 1972 - 1974 ===
A proposal to construct an underground car park for Members of Parliament at Westminster had been considered for many years. New Palace Yard was eventually chosen despite the engineering challenges posed by the proximity of significant buildings. The project involved constructing an 18.5-metre-deep underground car park in close proximity to the historic Palace of Westminster, including Westminster Hall, the House of Commons, and the Big Ben Clock Tower.

The design was heavily influenced by geotechnical considerations. Burland personally split and inspected London Clay soil samples from numerous boreholes at the site. London Clay is an ideal medium for deep excavations, as it has good shear strength and low permeability. However, it is susceptible to volumetric changes depending upon its moisture content.

Burland's analysis revealed that thin partings of silt and sand within the structure of the London Clay at New Palace Yard were problematic, giving rise to the possibility of flow through the soil. Burland identified that pore water pressures in the clay were in hydrostatic equilibrium with the water table in the overlying gravel, and insisted on special measures to prevent the risk of a catastrophic hydraulic uplift of the excavation base during the construction.

Finite-element analysis was conducted to understand the behaviour of the structure and surrounding ground, using soil parameters derived from full-scale measurements in the London area. Burland and his team supervised a comprehensive monitoring programme, observing the movement of nearby buildings, displacement of retaining walls, base heave, and the verticality of the Big Ben Clock Tower. Significant vertical and horizontal ground movements, extending more than three times the depth of the excavation, were recorded. The predicted and measured movements were compared, and their effects on surrounding buildings were analysed.

A reinforced concrete diaphragm wall, strutted by permanent concrete floors, was selected to minimise ground movement. Construction commenced in July 1972 and was completed in September 1974, with the main excavation occurring successfully under Burland's supervision, between April and November 1973.

=== Research, teaching, and publishing ===
Burland's work has included teaching, research, and publications on numerous geotechnical engineering topics, including the principles and limitations of the use of effective stress in certain soil conditions, soil-structure interaction, the influence of foundation movements on building performance near excavations, deep excavations and tunnels, piled foundations, foundations on difficult ground including shrinking and swelling clays, the mechanical behaviour of unsaturated soils, and the strength and stiffness of clays.

In addition to university teaching work and research, Burland has made several media appearances to explain soil mechanics to a broad audience. He was guest speaker at the 2023 Terzaghi Day, held annually by the American Society of Civil Engineers Geo-Institute on the birthday of Karl von Terzaghi.

=== Critical state soil mechanics ===
Burland’s PhD research on critical state soil mechanics saw him challenge several aspects of the Cam Clay constitutive model for reconstituted clays, and led to his development of the Modified Cam-Clay Model.

== Awards ==
His contribution to soil mechanics has been acknowledged internationally, and he was invited to deliver the 30th Rankine Lecture of the British Geotechnical Association titled On the compressibility and shear strength of natural clays. He was awarded the Institution of Structural Engineers Gold Medal in 1997. In 2002 he presented the Higginson Lecture and the Victor de Mello Lecture.

He was appointed as a Fellow of the Royal Academy of Engineering, and appointed Commander of the Order of the British Empire (CBE) in the 2005 New Year Honours for services to geotechnical engineering. Burland also received an honorary doctorate from Heriot-Watt University in 1994. In 2006 he was awarded the Royal Academy of Engineering’s Rooke Award in recognition of his work in generating interest in engineering amongst the public and the media. In March 2026, a seminar was held at Imperial College to celebrate Professor Burland's life and work on the occasion of his 90th birthday, which included an opening tribute by Robert Mair, Baron Mair.

His awards and decorations include:

- Commander of the Most Excellent Order of the British Empire (CBE), 2005
- Honorary Fellow of Cardiff University, 2005
- Fellow (FIC), Imperial College, 2004
- Honorary Fellow, Emmanuel College Cambridge, 2004
- "Commendatore" of the "Ordine della Stella di Solidariete' Italiana" (OSSI), President of Italy, 2003
- DSc Honoris Causa, University of Warwick, 2003
- DEng Honoris Causa, University of the Witwatersrand
- "Commendatore" of the Royal Order of Francis I of Sicily (KCFO), 2001
- DEng Honoris Causa, University of Glasgow, 2001
- DSc Honoris Causa, University of Nottingham, 1998
- Fellow (FCGI), City and Guilds of London Institute, 1998
- Fellow (FRS), The Royal Society, 1997
- DEng Honoris Causa, Heriot-Watt University, 1994
- Fellow (FREng), Royal Academy of Engineering, 1981.

== See also ==
- Imperial College Civil & Environmental Engineering
