= David Muir Wood =

British geotechnical engineer (born 1949)

- Born: 17 March 1949 (age 77); Folkestone, Kent, England
- Parent: Alan Muir Wood (father)
- Awards: Fellow of Institution of Civil Engineers, Japanese Geotechnical Society, Royal Society of Edinburgh, Royal Academy of Engineering

Academic background
- Education: Peterhouse, Cambridge, University of Cambridge
- Thesis: Some aspects of the mechanical behaviour of kaolin under truly triaxial conditions of stress and strain (1974)
- Doctoral advisor: Peter Wroth

Academic work
- Discipline: Geomechanics, Geotechnical Engineering, Soil Mechanics, Civil Engineering
- Institutions: University of Cambridge, University of Glasgow, University of Bristol, University of Dundee

David Muir Wood is an academic working in the field of geomechanics (the mechanics of geomaterials) and soil mechanics, famous for having pioneered advances in mathematical modelling of soils, informed by experimental observation. The hallmark of his modelling efforts has been to formulate elegant models that capture the essence of the material response while being accessible to practitioners of Geotechnical engineering.

David Muir Wood is author of a number of books for academic audiences as well as for the general public.

== Education ==
David Muir Wood obtained his BA degree at Cambridge University in 1970, where he proceeded onto his MA.

== Career ==
David Muir Wood obtained his PhD in Cambridge in 1974 under the supervision of Peter Wroth. The title of this work is 'Some aspects of the mechanical behaviour of kaolin under truly triaxial conditions of stress and strain' He then continued onto a Research fellowship between Cambridge and Norwegian Geotechnical Institute in 1975 followed by a lectureship, Cambridge (1975-1987). He was then appointed Professor of Civil Engineering, University of Glasgow, 1987-1995 (Head of Department, Dean of Engineering). He then moved onto Professor of Civil Engineering, University of Bristol, 1995-2009 (Head of Department, Dean of Engineering), retired 2009. Since 2009 he a Professor of Geotechnical Engineering at the University of Dundee, and Emeritus since 2014

Recent/current Visiting professorships:

- Politecnico di Milano, Italy
- Chalmers University of Technology Gothenburg, Sweden
- University of Western Australia, Australia
- TU Dresden, Germany
- University of Innsbruck, Australia
- Yokohama National University, Japan

== Awards ==
He is a fellow of the following institutions:

- Fellow of the Institution of Civil Engineers (FICE), since 1992
- Fellow of the Royal Academy of Engineering (FREng), since 1998
- International Honorary Member, Japanese Geotechnical Society, since 2010
- Fellow of the Royal Society of Edinburgh (FRSE), since 2012

== Bibliography ==
David Muir Wood is the author of a number of academic books:

- Muir Wood, D. (1990), Soil Behaviour and Critical State Soil Mechanics, Cambridge University Press, ISBN 0521337828
- Muir Wood, D. (2003), Geotechnical modelling, CRC Press, ISBN 1351990047
- Muir Wood, D. (2009), Soil Mechanics: A One-Dimensional Introduction, Cambridge University Press, ISBN 978-0521517737

As well as a large number of academic articles, some of the most significant of which are:

- Nova, R.; Wood, D.M. (1979), "A constitutive model for sand in triaxial compression", International Journal for Numerical and Analytical Methods in Geomechanics, 3 (3): 255–278, doi:10.1002/nag.1610030305
- Wood, D.M.; Belkheir, K.; Liu, D.F. (1994), "Strain softening and state parameter for sand modelling", Géotechnique, 44 (2): 335–339, doi:10.1680/geot.1994.44.2.335
- Gajo, A.; Muir Wood, D. (1999), "Severn-Trent sand: A kinematic-hardening constitutive model: the q-p formulation", Géotechnique, 49 (5): 595–614, doi:10.1680/geot.1999.49.5.595
- Rouainia, M.; Wood, D.M. (2000), "A kinematic hardening constitutive model for natural clays with loss of structure", Géotechnique, 50 (2): 153–164, doi:10.1680/geot.2000.50.2.153
- Wood, D.M.; Maeda, K. (2008), "Changing grading of soil: Effect on critical states", Acta Geotechnica, 3 (1): 3–14, doi:10.1007/s11440-007-0041-0, S2CID 129246830
- Diambra, A.; Ibraim, E.; Muir Wood, D.; Russell, A.R. (2010), "Fibre reinforced sands: Experiments and modelling", Geotextiles and Geomembranes, 28 (3): 238–250, doi:10.1016/j.geotexmem.2009.09.010
- Lombardi, D.; Bhattacharya, S.; Muir Wood, D. (2013), "Dynamic soil-structure interaction of monopile supported wind turbines in cohesive soil", Soil Dynamics and Earthquake Engineering, 49: 165–180, doi:10.1016/j.soildyn.2013.01.015

At least one book for the general public in the Very Short Introduction series:

- Muir Wood, D. (2012), Civil Engineering: A Very Short Introduction, Oxford University Press, ISBN 978-0199578634

== Personal life ==
David Muir Wood is the son of Alan Muir Wood and Winifred Leyton Lanagan
