= Takeback (disambiguation) =

Takeback usually refers to when sellers or manufacturers accept returns of products at the end of their lives, and is often associated with waste collection of certain products outside municipal waste-handling.

Takeback, take-back or take back can also refer to:

== Organizations ==
- Electronics TakeBack Coalition (ETBC), a U.S. organization previously headed by environmental campaigner David Wood

== Popular culture ==
- The Takeback, an episode of the 7th season of the Brooklyn Nine-Nine television series
- Take Back (film), a 2021 American action thriller film

== See also ==
- Tailback (disambiguation)
