= Cohesion (geology) =

Component of shear strength of a rock

Cohesion is the component of shear strength of a rock or soil that is independent of interparticle friction.

In soils, true cohesion is caused by following:

1. Electrostatic forces in stiff overconsolidated clays (which may be lost through weathering)
2. Cementing by Fe_{2}O_{3}, Ca CO_{3}, Na Cl, etc.

There can also be apparent cohesion. This is caused by:

1. Negative capillary pressure (which is lost upon wetting)
2. Pore pressure response during undrained loading (which is lost through time)
3. Root cohesion (which may be lost through logging or fire of the contributing plants, or through solution)

== Typical values of cohesion ==
Cohesion (alternatively called the cohesive strength) is typically measured on the basis of Mohr–Coulomb theory. Some values for rocks and some common soils are listed in the table below.

Cohesive strength (c) for some materials
Material	Cohesive strength in kPa	Cohesive strength in psi
Rock	10000	1450
Silt	75	10
Clay	10 to 20	1.5 to 3
Very soft clay	0 to 48	0 to 7
Soft clay	48 to 96	7 to 14
Medium clay	96 to 192	14 to 28
Stiff clay	192 to 384	28 to 56
Very stiff clay	384 to 766	28 to 110
Hard clay	> 766	> 110

== Apparent cohesion of soil ==
During critical state flow of soil, the undrained cohesion results from effective stress and critical state friction, not chemical bonds between soil particles. All that small clay mineral particles and chemicals do during steady plastic deformation of soft soil is to cause a pore water suction, which can be measured. When we remould soft soil in a classification test, its strength is [(suction) x (friction)], it remains ductile plastic material with constant "apparent cohesion" while it flows at constant volume, because it is at a constant effective stress, and critical state friction is constant. Critical state soil mechanics analyses the bearing capacity of soft clay on the wet side of critical state in terms of a perfectly plastic material with rapid undrained "apparent" cohesion.

== See also ==
- Mohr–Coulomb failure criterion
