= Kenneth H. Roscoe =

British civil engineer and academic (1914-1970)

- Born: 13 December 1914
- Died: 10 April 1970 (aged 55)
- Education: Emmanuel College, Cambridge
- Scientific career
- Workplaces: University of Cambridge
- Academic advisors: John Baker, Baron Baker
- Doctoral students: Peter Wroth; Andrew N. Schofield; John Burland; A. Thurairajah

Kenneth Harry Roscoe (13 December 1914 – 10 April 1970) was a British civil engineer who made tremendous contributions to the plasticity theories of soil mechanics.

== Early life ==
Roscoe was born in 1914, the son of Col. H. Roscoe, OBE, of Stoke-on-Trent. He was educated at Newcastle-under-Lyme High School and at Emmanuel College, Cambridge, where he studied the Mechanical Sciences tripos and was elected a senior scholar. After a brief period spent as a technical trainee at Metropolitan-Cammell, Roscoe was posted as an adjutant to the Corps of Royal Engineers Forward Sub-Area in northern France at the beginning of World War II. In 1940 he was captured at Boulogne and spent the next five years in Germany as a Prisoner of War.

== Work ==
After returning to the Department of Engineering at Cambridge in 1945 as a research student, Roscoe was subsequently employed as a demonstrator, lecturer and reader, before being elected into one of the Professorships of Engineering at the university in 1968. From 1946 he was head of the department's Soil Mechanics Laboratory. In an attempt to advance soil testing techniques, in the late forties and early fifties, he developed a simple shear apparatus in which his successive students attempted to study the changes in conditions in the shear zone both in sand and in clay soils. In 1958 a study of the yielding of soil based on some Cambridge data of the simple shear apparatus tests, and on much more extensive data of triaxial tests at Imperial College London from research led by Professor Sir Alec Skempton at the Imperial Geotechnical Laboratories, led to the publication of the critical state concept.

Roscoe's experiences of trying to create tunnels to escape when held as a prisoner of war introduced him to soil mechanics. His pioneering work lead to the formation of the theory of Critical state soil mechanics and what is known today as the Cam clay constitutive model for the behaviour of soils.

== Academic Contribution ==
He was the research supervisor of John Burland, A. Thurairajah, Andrew N. Schofield and Peter Wroth. In 1970, he delivered the 10th Rankine Lecture titled "The influence of strains in soil mechanics".

== See also ==
- Critical state soil mechanics
