= Peter Wroth =

British civil engineer

- Born: 1929
- Died: 1991 (aged 61–62)
- Education: Emmanuel College, Cambridge
- Scientific career
- Workplaces: University of Cambridge; University of Oxford
- Thesis: The behaviour of soils and other granular media when subjected to shear (1958)
- Doctoral advisor: Kenneth H. Roscoe
- Doctoral students: Guy T. Houlsby, David Muir Wood

Charles Peter Wroth (1929–1991) was a British civil engineer, a world pioneer in geotechnical engineering and soil mechanics.

== Education ==
Wroth was educated at Marlborough College and Emmanuel College, Cambridge, where he studied Engineering and carried out research in Soil Mechanics under Kenneth H. Roscoe, leading to the award of a PhD degree in 1958 with his thesis titled "The behaviour of soils and other granular media when subjected to shear". He served as Professor at the University of Oxford and the University of Cambridge. He also served as Master of Emmanuel College for a brief period prior to his death.

== Academic recognition ==
He delivered the 24th Rankine Lecture, titled "The interpretation of in situ soil tests".

== Sport ==
Wroth played county cricket at amateur level, playing minor counties cricket for Devon from 1947–50, and later for Cambridgeshire in 1962. He also played international hockey for Wales.

Academic offices
Preceded by Derek Brewer	Master of Emmanuel College, Cambridge; 1990–1990	Succeeded by Norman St John-Stevas, Baron St John of Fawsley
