= Tailback =

Tailback may refer to:

- Tailback (American football), an offensive position in American football; a halfback in the I formation
- Tailback (road traffic), or traffic jam, a line of motor vehicles caught up in traffic congestion

== See also ==
- Back (American football)
- Takeback (disambiguation)
