= David Woods =

David Woods may refer to:

- David Woods (New York politician), a 19th-century American politician
- David B. Woods, U.S. Navy admiral, former commandant Guantanamo prison camp
- Dave Woods (commentator), British sports commentator
- Dave Woods (rugby league, born 1966) (1966–1996), Australian rugby league footballer of the 1980s and 1990s
- David Woods (rugby league, born 1970), Australian rugby league footballer of the 1980s, 1990s and 2000s
- Dave Woods (rugby league coach) (born 1970), Australian rugby league footballer and coach
- David Woods (water polo) (1944–2017), Australian Olympic water polo player
- David Woods (safety researcher), researcher in the field of resilience engineering

== See also ==
- David Wood (disambiguation)
