= Acta Geotechnica =

- Discipline: Geotechnical Engineering
- Language: English
- Edited by: Wei Wu

Publication details
- History: 2006-present
- Publisher: Springer Science+Business Media (Germany)
- Frequency: Bimonthly
- Open access: Hybrid
- Impact factor: 5.8 (2020)

Standard abbreviations
- ISO 4: Acta Geotech.

Indexing
- ISSN: 1861-1125 (print); 1861-1133 (web)
- OCLC no.: 69955826

Links
- Journal homepage; Online access

Acta Geotechnica is a bimonthly peer-reviewed engineering journal published by Springer. The editor-in-chief is Wei Wu (University of Natural Resources and Life Sciences, Vienna). The other two journal editors Ronaldo Borja (Stanford, USA), and Jian Chu (Singapore).

Acta Geotechnica covers fundamental and applied research in geotechnical engineering, including mining, tunneling, and dam engineering, as well as geohazard, geoenvironmental, and petroleum engineering. Publishing formats include research papers, review articles, short notes, and letters to the editors. This journal is among the top journals in the field of Geotechnical engineering.

== Abstracting and indexing ==
The journal was started in 2006 and was included in SCI in 2010. The Impact Factor for 2020 is 5.8, which is the 1st place among the 35 SCI journals in the category of "Engineering Geological". The journal is abstracted and indexed in:

- Current Contents/Engineering, Computing and Technology
- SCI
- Scopus
- Inspec
- EBSCO databases
- CSA Illumina
- Academic OneFile
- GeoRef
- VINITI Database RAS

According to the Journal Citation Reports, the journal has a 2020 impact factor of 5.8.
