= Japanese Geotechnical Society =

The Japanese Geotechnical Society was established in 1949 and had a total of 122 members. Its purpose was to promote technical advances and research activities in the field of geotechnical engineering. From the very outset, its role has been expanding as modern society has placed ever greater demands on it to provide a wide range of services. Since June 2004, The society has had about 13,000 members, making it one of the largest and most active societies among the more than 100 such societies in existence in Japan. The year 1999 marked its 50th anniversary. The society has become known by its official abbreviation as the JGS.

The society joined the International Society for Soil Mechanics and Foundation Engineering in 1950 and has played a significant role on the international stage since then. It had the honor of hosting the Second Asian Regional Conference in 1964, the 9th International Conference in 1977 and the 8th Asian Regional Conference in 1988.

Japanese geotechnicians have also been extremely involved at an international level. Prof. Masami Fukuoka served as the president of the International Society for Soil Mechanics and Foundation Engineering from 1977 to 1981. Prof. Kenji Ishihara also served as the president of the International Society for Soil Mechanics and Geotechnical Engineering for the period 1997–2001. In addition, Prof. Ishihara gave the 33rd Rankine Lecture of the British Geotechnical Society at the Imperial College of Science, Technology and Medicine on 24 March 1993.
