= David Wood (politician) =

American politician

Member of the Missouri House of Representatives from the 58th district
- In office 2013 – June 15, 2020
- Succeeded by: Willard Haley

Personal details
- Born: April 15, 1961 (age 65) Jefferson City, Missouri
- Party: Republican
- Spouse: Cheryl
- Children: two
- Profession: teacher, tech administrator

David Wood (born April 15, 1961) is an American politician. He was a member of the Missouri House of Representatives, who served from 2013 to 2021. He is a member of the Republican Party.
