= David Wood (cricketer) =

English cricketer (born 1965)

Personal information
- Full name: David John Wood
- Born: 10 January 1965 (age 61); Cuckfield, Sussex, England
- Batting: Left-handed
- Bowling: Slow left-arm orthodox

Domestic team information
- Years: Team
- 1984: Sussex

Career statistics
Competition	First-class
Matches	2
Runs scored	32
Batting average	10.66
100s/50s	–/–
Top score	15
Balls bowled	–
Wickets	–
Bowling average	–
5 wickets in innings	–
10 wickets in match	–
Best bowling	–
Catches/stumpings	–/–
- Source: Cricinfo, 26 November 2011

David John Wood (born 10 January 1965) is a former English cricketer. Wood was a left-handed batsman who bowled slow left-arm orthodox. He was born at Cuckfield, Sussex.

Wood made two first-class appearances for Sussex against Surrey and Hampshire in the 1984 County Championship. Against Surrey, he scored 15 runs in Sussex's first and only innings of the match, before being dismissed by Graham Monkhouse. The match ended in a draw. Against Hampshire, Wood scored 12 runs in Sussex's first-innings, before being dismissed by Cardigan Connor, while in their second-innings he was dismissed by Nigel Cowley for 5 runs. Hampshire won this match by 108 runs. He made no further major appearances for Sussex after this match.
