= David Wood (environmental campaigner) =

American lawyer and activist

David E. Wood (July 1, 1963 – December 10, 2006) was an attorney and environmental activist. Best known for his work in the field of electronics recycling, he was executive director of the GrassRoots Recycling Network (GRRN) in Madison, Wisconsin and organizing director of the nationwide Computer TakeBack Campaign (CTBC).

Wood was born in Clifton Springs, NY, to two locally known doctors. He had seven brothers and sisters. He attended Bucknell University, receiving his training in law at the University at Buffalo. After graduating from law school, he moved to Los Angeles, where he worked for the California Public Interest Research Group (CalPIRG).

Later, Wood moved to Madison, Wisconsin, working first for the Center on Wisconsin Strategy (COWS), and then the GrassRoots Recycling Network. He became heavily involved with the Computer TakeBack Campaign in which he urged computer manufacturers to take back their old computers and recycle them properly. His most widely known contribution was the creation of the Dell TakeBack Campaign. His chapter, "ToxicDude.com: the Dell Campaign" (with Robin Schneider) in Challenging the Chip, recounts CTBC's successful national campaign to convince Dell, Inc., to take back and responsibly disassemble its obsolete consumer electronic products. He died in Madison.

Wisconsin's new electronics recycling statute, Senate Bill 107, was signed into law by Governor Jim Doyle on October 23, 2009, in Wood's honor based on Wood's work with the Computer TakeBack Campaign and his dedication to reducing electronic waste.
