= Critical state soil mechanics =

Behavior of soil under varying stresses

Normally consolidated soil goes to critical state along the stress path on Roscoe surface

Critical state soil mechanics is the area of soil mechanics that encompasses the conceptual models representing the mechanical behavior of saturated remoulded soils based on the critical state concept. At the critical state, the relationship between forces applied in the soil (stress), and the resulting deformation resulting from this stress (strain) becomes constant. The soil will continue to deform, but the stress will no longer increase.

Forces are applied to soils in a number of ways, for example when they are loaded by foundations, or unloaded by excavations. The critical state concept is used to predict the behaviour of soils under various loading conditions, and geotechnical engineers use the critical state model to estimate how soil will behave under different stresses.

The basic concept is that soil and other granular materials, if continuously distorted until they flow as a frictional fluid, will come into a well-defined critical state. In practical terms, the critical state can be considered a failure condition for the soil. It's the point at which the soil cannot sustain any additional load without undergoing continuous deformation, in a manner similar to the behaviour of fluids.

Certain properties of the soil, like porosity, shear strength, and volume, reach characteristic values. These properties are intrinsic to the type of soil and its initial conditions.

== Theories of Critical State Soil Mechanics ==
The Critical State concept is an idealization of the observed behavior of saturated remoulded clays in triaxial compression tests, and it is assumed to apply to undisturbed soils. It states that soils and other granular materials, if continuously distorted (sheared) until they flow as a frictional fluid, will come into a well-defined critical state. At the onset of the critical state, shear distortions $\ \varepsilon_s$ occur without any further changes in mean effective stress $\ p'$, deviatoric stress $\ q$ (or yield stress, $\ \sigma_y$, in uniaxial tension according to the von Mises yielding criterion), or specific volume $\ \nu$:

$$\ \frac{\partial p'}{\partial \varepsilon_s}=\frac{\partial q}{\partial \varepsilon_s}=\frac{\partial \nu}{\partial \varepsilon_s}=0$$

where,

$$\ \nu=1+e$$
$$\ p'=\frac{1}{3}(\sigma_1'+\sigma_2'+\sigma_3')$$
$$\ q= \sqrt{\frac{(\sigma_1' - \sigma_2')^2 + (\sigma_2' - \sigma_3')^2 + (\sigma_1' - \sigma_3')^2}{2}}$$

However, for triaxial conditions $\ \sigma_2'=\sigma_3'$. Thus,

$$\ p'=\frac{1}{3}(\sigma_1'+2\sigma_3')$$
$$\ q=(\sigma_1'-\sigma_3')$$

All critical states, for a given soil, form a unique line called the Critical State Line (CSL) defined by the following equations in the space $\ (p', q, v)$:

$$\ q=Mp'$$
$$\ \nu=\Gamma-\lambda \ln(p')$$

where $\ M$, $\ \Gamma$, and $\ \lambda$ are soil constants. The first equation determines the magnitude of the deviatoric stress $\ q$ needed to keep the soil flowing continuously as the product of a frictional constant $\ M$ (capital $\ \mu$) and the mean effective stress $\ p'$. The second equation states that the specific volume $\ \nu$ occupied by unit volume of flowing particles will decrease as the logarithm of the mean effective stress increases.

== History ==
In an attempt to advance soil testing techniques, Kenneth Harry Roscoe of Cambridge University, in the late forties and early fifties, developed a simple shear apparatus in which his successive students attempted to study the changes in conditions in the shear zone both in sand and in clay soils. In 1958 a study of the yielding of soil based on some Cambridge data of the simple shear apparatus tests, and on much more extensive data of triaxial tests at Imperial College London from research led by Professor Sir Alec Skempton at Imperial College, led to the publication of the critical state concept (Roscoe, Schofield & Wroth 1958).

Roscoe obtained his undergraduate degree in mechanical engineering and his experiences trying to create tunnels to escape when held as a prisoner of war by the Nazis during WWII introduced him to soil mechanics. Subsequent to this 1958 paper, concepts of plasticity were introduced by Schofield and published in his textbook. Schofield was taught at Cambridge by Prof. John Baker, a structural engineer who was a strong believer in designing structures that would fail "plastically". Prof. Baker's theories strongly influenced Schofield's thinking on soil shear. Prof. Baker's views were developed from his pre-war work on steel structures and further informed by his wartime experiences assessing blast-damaged structures and with the design of the "Morrison Shelter", an air-raid shelter which could be located indoors (Schofield 2006).

== Original Cam-Clay Model ==
The name cam clay asserts that the plastic volume change typical of clay soil behaviour is due to mechanical stability of an aggregate of small, rough, frictional, interlocking hard particles. The Original Cam-Clay model is based on the assumption that the soil is isotropic, elasto-plastic, deforms as a continuum, and it is not affected by creep. The yield surface of the Cam clay model is described by the equation

$$f(p,q,p_c) = q + M\,p\,\ln\left[\frac{p}{p_c}\right] \le 0$$

where $q$ is the equivalent stress, $p$ is the pressure, $p_c$ is the pre-consolidation pressure, and $M$ is the slope of the critical state line in $p-q$ space.

The pre-consolidation pressure evolves as the void ratio ($e$) (and therefore the specific volume $v$) of the soil changes. A commonly used relation is

$$e = e_0 - \lambda \ln\left[\frac{p_c}{p_{c0}}\right]$$

where $\lambda$ is the virgin compression index of the soil. A limitation of this model is the possibility of negative specific volumes at realistic values of stress.

An improvement to the above model for $p_c$ is the bilogarithmic form

$$\ln\left[\frac{1+e}{1+e_0}\right] = \ln\left[\frac{v}{v_0}\right] = - \tilde{\lambda} \ln\left[\frac{p_c}{p_{c0}}\right]$$

where $\tilde{\lambda}$ is the appropriate compressibility index of the soil.

Cam-clay yield surface in p-q space.

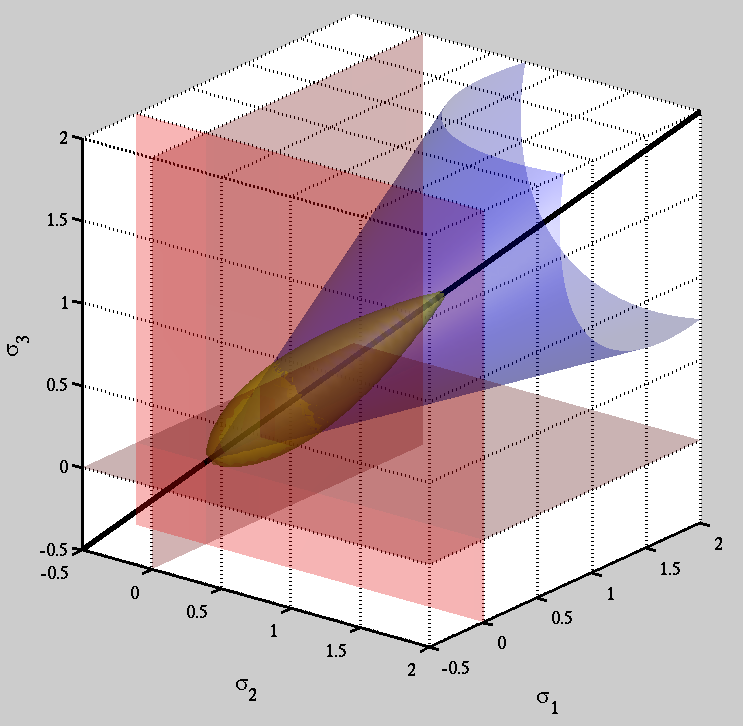
Cam-clay yield surface in principal stress space.

== Modified Cam-Clay Model ==
Professor John Burland of Imperial College who worked with Professor Roscoe is credited with the development of the modified version of the original model. The difference between the Cam Clay and the Modified Cam Clay (MCC) is that the yield surface of the MCC is described by an ellipse and therefore the plastic strain increment vector (which is perpendicular to the yield surface) for the largest value of the mean effective stress is horizontal, and hence no incremental deviatoric plastic strain takes place for a change in mean effective stress (for purely hydrostatic states of stress). This is very convenient for constitutive modelling in numerical analysis, especially finite element analysis, where numerical stability issues are important (as a curve needs to be continuous in order to be differentiable).

The yield surface of the modified Cam-clay model has the form

$$f(p,q,p_c) = \left[\frac{q}{M}\right]^2 + p\,(p - p_c) \le 0$$

where $p$ is the pressure, $q$ is the equivalent stress, $p_c$ is the pre-consolidation pressure, and $M$ is the slope of the critical state line.

Modified Cam-clay yield surface in p-q space.

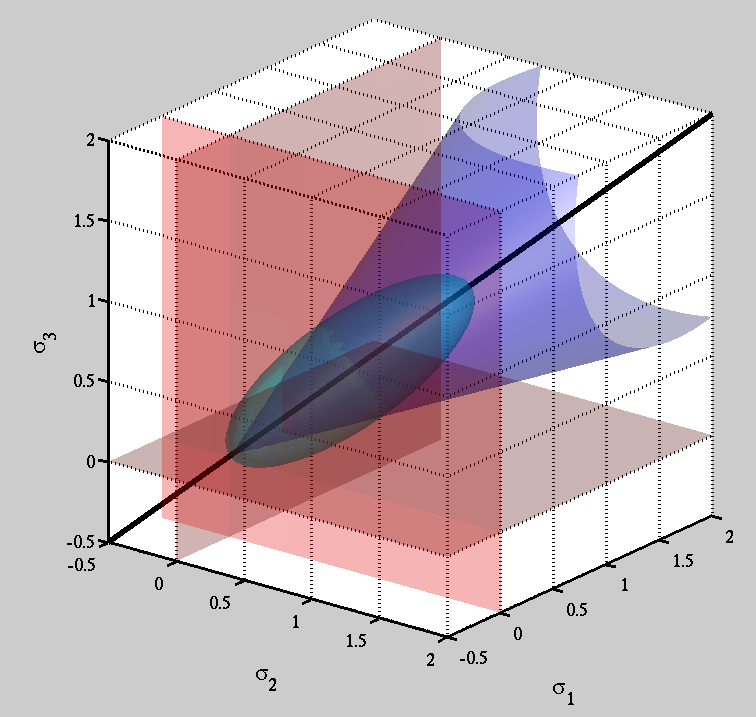
Modified Cam-clay yield surface in principal stress space.

== Critique ==
The basic concepts of the elasto-plastic approach were first proposed by two mathematicians Daniel C. Drucker and William Prager (Drucker and Prager, 1952) in a short eight page note. In their note, Drucker and Prager also demonstrated how to use their approach to calculate the critical height of a vertical bank using either a plane or a log spiral failure surface. Their yield criterion is today called the Drucker-Prager yield criterion. Their approach was subsequently extended by Kenneth H. Roscoe and others in the soil mechanics department of Cambridge University.

Critical state and elasto-plastic soil mechanics have been the subject of criticism ever since they were first introduced. The key factor driving the criticism is primarily the implicit assumption that soils are made of isotropic point particles. Real soils are composed of finite size particles with anisotropic properties that strongly determine observed behavior. Consequently, models based on a metals based theory of plasticity are not able to model behavior of soils that is a result of anisotropic particle properties, one example of which is the drop in shear strengths post peak strength, i.e., strain-softening behavior. Because of this elasto-plastic soil models are only able to model "simple stress-strain curves" such as that from isotropic normally or lightly over consolidated "fat" clays, i.e., CL-ML type soils constituted of very fine grained particles.

Also, in general, volume change is governed by considerations from elasticity and, this assumption being largely untrue for real soils, results in very poor matches of these models to volume changes or pore pressure changes. Further, elasto-plastic models describe the entire element as a whole and not specifically conditions directly on the failure plane, as a consequence of which, they do not model the stress-strain curve post failure, particularly for soils that exhibit strain-softening post peak. Finally, most models separate out the effects of hydrostatic stress and shear stress, with each assumed to cause only volume change and shear change respectively. In reality, soil structure, being analogous to a "house of cards," shows both shear deformations on the application of pure compression, and volume changes on the application of pure shear.

Additional criticisms are that the theory is "only descriptive," i.e., only describes known behavior and lacking the ability to either explain or predict standard soil behaviors such as, why the void ratio in a one dimensional compression test varies linearly with the logarithm of the vertical effective stress. This behavior, critical state soil mechanics simply assumes as a given.

For these reasons, critical-state and elasto-plastic soil mechanics have been subject to charges of scholasticism; the tests to demonstrated its validity are usually "conformation tests" where only simple stress-strain curves are demonstrated to be modeled satisfactorily. The critical-state and concepts surrounding it have a long history of being "scholastic," with Sir Alec Skempton, the “founding father” of British soil mechanics, attributed the scholastic nature of CSSM to Roscoe, of whom he said: “…he did little field work and was, I believe, never involved in a practical engineering job.”.In the 1960s and 1970s, Prof. Alan Bishop at Imperial College used to routinely demonstrate the inability of these theories to match the stress-strain curves of real soils. Joseph (2013) has suggested that critical-state and elasto-plastic soil mechanics meet the criterion of a “degenerate research program” a concept proposed by the philosopher of science Imre Lakatos, for theories where excuses are used to justify an inability of theory to match empirical data.

=== Response ===
The claims that critical state soil mechanics is only descriptive and meets the criterion of a degenerate research program have not been settled. Andrew Jenike used a logarithmic-logarithmic relation to describe the compression test in his theory of critical state and admitted decreases in stress during converging flow and increases in stress during diverging flow. Chris Szalwinski has defined a critical state as a multi-phase state at which the specific volume is the same in both solid and fluid phases. Under his definition the linear-logarithmic relation of the original theory and Jenike's logarithmic-logarithmic relation are special cases of a more general physical phenomenon.

== Stress tensor formulations ==
=== Plane stress ===
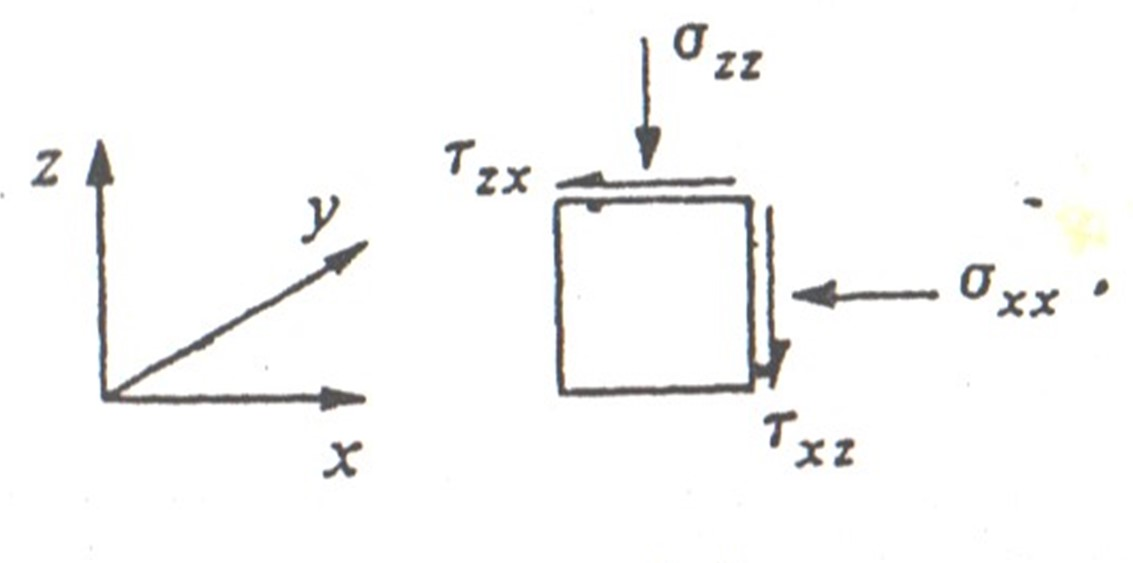
Plane Strain State of Stress

$$\sigma=\left[\begin{matrix}\sigma_{xx}&0&\tau_{xz}\\0&0&0\\\tau_{zx}&0&\sigma_{zz}\\\end{matrix}\right] =\left[\begin{matrix}\sigma_{xx}&\tau_{xz}\\\tau_{zx}&\sigma_{zz}\\\end{matrix}\right]$$

==== Drained conditions ====
===== Plane Strain State of Stress =====
Separation of Plane Strain Stress State Matrix into Distortional and Volumetric Parts:
$$\sigma=\left[\begin{matrix}\sigma_{xx}&0&\tau_{xz}\\0&0&0\\\tau_{zx}&0&\sigma_{zz}\\\end{matrix}\right] =\left[\begin{matrix}\sigma_{xx}&\tau_{xz}\\\tau_{zx}&\sigma_{zz}\\\end{matrix}\right]=\left[\begin{matrix}\sigma_{xx}-\sigma_{hydrostatic}&\tau_{xz}\\\tau_{zx}&\sigma_{zz}-\sigma_{hydrostatic}\\\end{matrix}\right]+\left[\begin{matrix}\sigma_{hydrostatic}&0\\0&\sigma_{hydrostatic}\\\end{matrix}\right]$$

$\sigma_{hydrostatic}=p_{mean}=\frac{\sigma_{xx}+\sigma_{zz}}{2}$

After $\delta\sigma_z$ loading

$$\left[\begin{matrix}\sigma_{xx}-\sigma_{hydrostatic}&\tau_{xz}\\\tau_{zx}&\sigma_{zz}-\sigma_{hydrostatic}\\\end{matrix}\right]+\left[\begin{matrix}\sigma_{hydrostatic}&0\\0&\sigma_{hydrostatic}\\\end{matrix}\right]
+\left[\begin{matrix}0&0\\0&\sigma_{z}\ \\\end{matrix}\right]$$

==== Drained state of stress ====
$$\left[\begin{matrix}\sigma_{xx}-\sigma_{hydrostatic}&\tau_{xz}\\\tau_{zx}&\sigma_{zz}-\sigma_{hydrostatic}\\\end{matrix}\right]+\left[\begin{matrix}\sigma_{hydrostatic}&0\\0&\sigma_{hydrostatic}\\\end{matrix}\right]$$
$$+\left[\begin{matrix}0&0\\0&\mathbf{\delta z}\ \\\end{matrix}\right]=\left[\begin{matrix}\sigma_{xx}-\sigma_{hydrostatic}&\tau_{xz}\\\tau_{zx}&\sigma_{zz}-\sigma_{hydrostatic}\\\end{matrix}\right]+\left[\begin{matrix}\sigma_{hydrostatic}&0\\0&\sigma_{hydrostatic}\\\end{matrix}\right]$$
$$+\left[\begin{matrix}\frac{-{\delta p}_w}{2}\ &0\\0&\sigma_z-\frac{{\delta p}_w}{2}\ \\\end{matrix}\right]$$
$$+\left[\begin{matrix}\frac{{\delta p}_w}{2}&0\\0&\frac{{\delta p}_w}{2}\ \\\end{matrix}\right]$$

===== Drained Plane Strain State =====
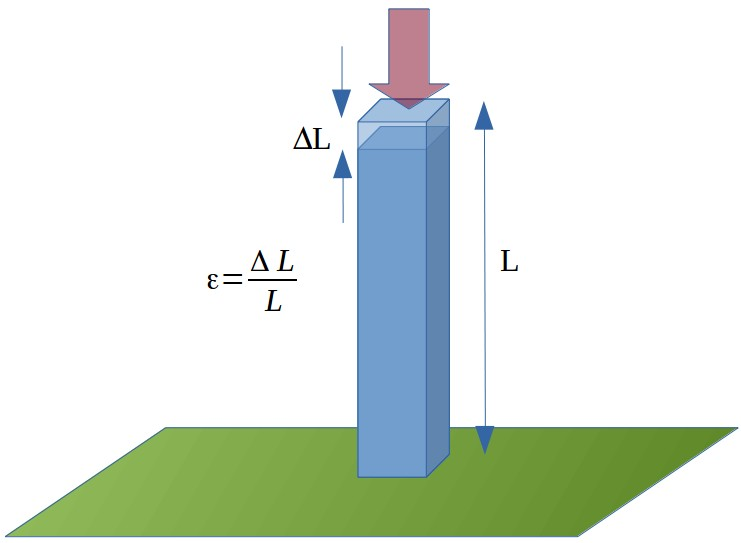
for Drained Plane Strain State

$\varepsilon_z=\frac{\Delta h}{h_0}$;$\ \varepsilon_x=\varepsilon_y=0$

$\varepsilon_z=\frac{1}{E}(\sigma_z-\nu)(\sigma_x+\sigma_z)=\frac{1}{E}\sigma_z(1-2\nu\varepsilon)$; $\varepsilon=\frac{\nu}{1-\nu};\ \nu=\frac{\varepsilon}{1+\varepsilon}$

By matrix:

$$\varepsilon_z=\frac{1}{E}(1-2\nu\varepsilon)\ \left[\left[\begin{matrix}\sigma_{xx}-\rho_w&\tau_{xz}\\\tau_{zx}&\sigma_{zz}-\rho_w\\\end{matrix}\right]+\left[\begin{matrix}\rho_w&0\\0&\rho_w\\\end{matrix}\right]\right]$$;

==== Undrained conditions ====
===== Undrained state of stress =====
$$\left[\begin{matrix}\sigma_{xx}-\rho_w&\tau_{xz}\\\tau_{zx}&\sigma_{zz}-\rho_w\\\end{matrix}\right]+$$
$$\left[\begin{matrix}\rho_w&0\\0&\rho_w\\\end{matrix}\right]+\left[\begin{matrix}0&0\\0&\delta\sigma_z\ \\\end{matrix}\right]=$$

$$=\left[\begin{matrix}\sigma_{xx}-\rho_w&\tau_{xz}\\\tau_{zx}&\sigma_{zz}-\rho_w\\\end{matrix}\right]+$$
$$\left[\begin{matrix}\rho_w&0\\0&\rho_w\\\end{matrix}\right]$$
$$+\ \ \left[\begin{matrix}-{p}_w\ /\mathbf{2}&0\\0&\sigma_z-{p}_w/\mathbf{2}\ \\\end{matrix}\right]+\left[\begin{matrix}\delta p_w/2&0\\0&\delta p_w/\mathbf{2}\ \\\end{matrix}\right]=$$

$$=\left[\begin{matrix}\sigma_{xx}-\rho_w&\tau_{xz}\\\tau_{zx}&\sigma_{zz}-\rho_w\\\end{matrix}\right]+$$
$$\left[\begin{matrix}\rho_w&0\\0&\rho_w\\\end{matrix}\right]$$
$$+\ \ \left[\begin{matrix}-{p}_w\ /\mathbf{2}&0\\0&\sigma_z-{p}_w/\mathbf{2}\ \\\end{matrix}\right]+\left[\begin{matrix}\delta p_w/2&0\\0&\delta p_w/\mathbf{2}\ \\\end{matrix}\right]+$$
$$\left[\begin{matrix}0&\tau_{xz}\\{\tau}_{zx}&0\\\end{matrix}\right]-\left[\begin{matrix}0&{\delta p}_{w,int}\\{\delta p}_{w,int}&0\\\end{matrix}\right]$$

=== Undrained state of Plane Strain State ===
$\varepsilon_z=\frac{1}{E}\left(1-2\nu\varepsilon\right)=$

$$=\left[\left[\begin{matrix}\sigma_{xx}-\rho_w&\tau_{xz}\\\tau_{zx}&\sigma_{zz}-\rho_w\\\end{matrix}\right]+\left[\begin{matrix}\rho_w&0\\0&\rho_w\\\end{matrix}\right]+\left[\begin{matrix}0&\delta \tau_{xz}\\{\delta \tau}_{zx}&0\\\end{matrix}\right]-\left[\begin{matrix}0&{\delta p}_{w,int}\\{\delta p}_{w,int}&0\\\end{matrix}\right]\right]=$$

$=\frac{1}{E}\left(1-2\nu\varepsilon\right)\left[\rho_u+\rho_w+p\right]$

$\rho_u=K_u\Delta\varepsilon_z;\ \ \rho_w=\frac{K_w}{n}\Delta\varepsilon_z;\ \ \rho_=K_\Delta\varepsilon_z;$

=== Triaxial State of Stress ===
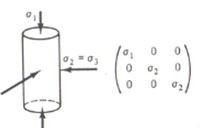
Triaxial State of Stress

Separation Matrix into Distortional and Volumetric Parts:

$$\sigma=\left[\begin{matrix}\sigma_r&0&0\\0&\sigma_r&0\\0&0&\sigma_z\\\end{matrix}\right]=\left[\begin{matrix}\sigma_r-\sigma_{hydrostatic}&0&0\\0&\sigma_r-\sigma_{hydrostatic}&0\\0&0&\sigma_z-\sigma_{hydrostatic}\\\end{matrix}\right]+\left[\begin{matrix}\sigma_{hydrostatic}&0&0\\0&\sigma_{hydrostatic}&0\\0&0&\sigma_{hydrostatic}\\\end{matrix}\right]$$

=== Undrained state of Triaxial stress ===
$$\left[\begin{matrix}\sigma_r-\sigma_{hydrostatic}&0&0\\0&\sigma_r-\sigma_{hydrostatic}&0\\0&0&\sigma_z-\sigma_{hydrostatic}\\\end{matrix}\right]$$
$$+\left[\begin{matrix}\sigma_{hydrostatic}&0&0\\0&\sigma_{hydrostatic}&0\\0&0&\sigma_{hydrostatic}\\\end{matrix}\right]$$

$$+\left[\begin{matrix}-\left(\frac{r}{2H\ast3}\right){p}_w&0&0\\0&-\left(\frac{r}{2H\ast3}\right){(p}_w&0\\0&0&(\sigma_z-{\left(\frac{r}{2H\ast3}\right)\ast\ p}_w\\\end{matrix}\right]$$
$$-\ \ \left[\begin{matrix}{\left(\frac{r}{2H\ast3}\right)p}_w&0&0\\0&{\left(\frac{r}{2H\ast3}\right)p}_w&0\\0&0&\left(\frac{r}{2H\ast3}\right)p_w\\\end{matrix}\right]+$$

$$\left[\begin{matrix}0&0&{\delta \tau_{xz}}\\0&0&0\\\delta {\tau}_{\delta {zx}}&0&0\\\end{matrix}\right]$$
$$+\left[\begin{matrix}{\delta p_{w,int}}&0&0\\0&{\delta p_{w,int}}&0\\0&0&{\delta p_{w,int}}\\\end{matrix}\right]+$$
$$\left[\begin{matrix}{-\delta p_{w,int}}&0&0\\0&{-\delta p_{w,int}}&0\\0&0&{-\delta p_{w,int}}\\\end{matrix}\right]+$$
$$\left[\begin{matrix}0&0&{-\delta \tau_{xz}}\\0&0&0\\-\delta {\tau}_{\delta {zx}}&0&0\\\end{matrix}\right]$$

=== Drained state of Triaxial stress ===
Only volumetric in case of drainage:

$$\left[\begin{matrix}\sigma_r-\sigma_{hydrostatic}&0&0\\0&\sigma_r-\sigma_{hydrostatic}&0\\0&0&\sigma_z-\sigma_{hydrostatic}\\\end{matrix}\right]$$
$$+\left[\begin{matrix}\sigma_{hydrostatic}&0&0\\0&\sigma_{hydrostatic}&0\\0&0&\sigma_{hydrostatic}\\\end{matrix}\right]$$

$$+\left[\begin{matrix}-\left(\frac{r}{2H\ast3}\right){p}_w&0&0\\0&-\left(\frac{r}{2H\ast3}\right){(p}_w&0\\0&0&(\sigma_z-{\left(\frac{r}{2H\ast3}\right)\ast\ p}_w\\\end{matrix}\right]$$
$$-\ \ \left[\begin{matrix}{\left(\frac{r}{2H\ast3}\right)p}_w&0&0\\0&{\left(\frac{r}{2H\ast3}\right)p}_w&0\\0&0&\left(\frac{r}{2H\ast3}\right)p_w\\\end{matrix}\right]+$$

== Example solution in matrix form ==
The following data were obtained from a conventional triaxial compression test on a saturated (B=1), normally consolidated simple clay (Ladd, 1964). The cell pressure was held constant at 10 kPa, while the axial stress was increased to failure (axial compression test)..

Step	/ε axial	$\delta$σ	$\delta$ u
0	0	0	0
1	1	3,5	1,9
2	2	4,5	2,8
3	4	5,2	3,5
4	6	5,4	3,9
5	8	5,6	4,1
6	10	5,7	4,3
7	12	5,8	4,4

Initial phase:
$$\sigma=\left[\begin{matrix}\sigma_r&0&0\\0&\sigma_r&0\\0&0&\sigma_z\\\end{matrix}\right]=\left[\begin{matrix}0&0&0\\0&10&0\\0&0&10\\\end{matrix}\right]$$

Step one:
$$\sigma_1=\left[\begin{matrix}0&0&0\\0&10&0\\0&0&10\\\end{matrix}\right]+\mathbf{\sigma}=\left[\begin{matrix}0&0&0\\0&10&0\\0&0&10\\\end{matrix}\right]+\left[\begin{matrix}1&0&0\\0&0&3.5\\0&-1&0\\\end{matrix}\right]$$
$$\left[\begin{matrix}1-1.9&0&0\\0&10-1.9&3.5\\0&-1\ &10-1.9\\\end{matrix}\right]+\left[\begin{matrix}1.9&0&0\\0&1.9&0\\0&0&1.9\\\end{matrix}\right]$$

Step 2-9 is same step one.

Step seven:
$$\sigma_7=\left[\begin{matrix}12-4.4\ \ \ &0&0\\0&10-4.4&2.9\\0&-2\ &10-4.4\\\end{matrix}\right]+\left[\begin{matrix}4.4&0&0\\0&4.4&0\\0&0&4.4\\\end{matrix}\right]$$
