= Shear strength (soil) =

Magnitude of the shear stress that a soil can sustain

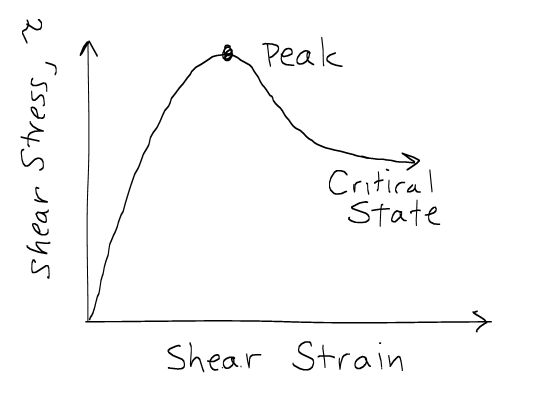
Typical stress strain curve for a drained dilatant soil

Shear strength is a term used in soil mechanics to describe the magnitude of the shear stress that a soil can sustain. The shear resistance of soil is a result of friction and interlocking of particles, and possibly cementation or bonding of particle contacts. Due to interlocking, particulate material may expand or contract in volume as it is subject to shear strains. If soil expands its volume, the density of particles will decrease and the strength will decrease; in this case, the peak strength would be followed by a reduction of shear stress. The stress-strain relationship levels off when the material stops expanding or contracting, and when interparticle bonds are broken. The theoretical state at which the shear stress and density remain constant while the shear strain increases may be called the critical state, steady state, or residual strength.

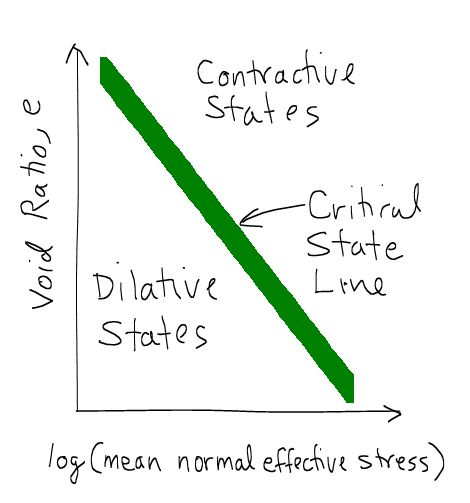
A critical state line separates the dilatant and contractive states for soil

The volume change behavior and interparticle friction depend on the density of the particles, the intergranular contact forces, and to a somewhat lesser extent, other factors such as the rate of shearing and the direction of the shear stress. The average normal intergranular contact force per unit area is called the effective stress.

If water is not allowed to flow in or out of the soil, the stress path is called an undrained stress path. During undrained shear, if the particles are surrounded by a nearly incompressible fluid such as water, then the density of the particles cannot change without drainage, but the water pressure and effective stress will change. On the other hand, if the fluids are allowed to freely drain out of the pores, then the pore pressures will remain constant and the test path is called a drained stress path. The soil is free to dilate or contract during shear if the soil is drained. In reality, soil is partially drained, somewhere between the perfectly undrained and drained idealized conditions.

The shear strength of soil depends on the effective stress, the drainage conditions, the density of the particles, the rate of strain, and the direction of the strain.

For undrained, constant volume shearing, the Tresca theory may be used to predict the shear strength, but for drained conditions, the Mohr–Coulomb theory may be used.

Two important theories of soil shear are the critical state theory and the steady state theory. There are key differences between the critical state condition and the steady state condition and the resulting theory corresponding to each of these conditions.

== Factors controlling shear strength of soils ==
The stress-strain relationship of soils, and therefore the shearing strength, is affected (Poulos 1989) by:

1. Soil composition (basic soil material): mineralogy, grain size and grain size distribution, shape of particles, pore fluid type and content, ions on grain and in pore fluid.
2. State (initial): Defined by the initial void ratio, effective normal stress and shear stress (stress history). State can be described by terms such as: loose, dense, overconsolidated, normally consolidated, stiff, soft, contractive, dilative, etc.
3. Structure: Refers to the arrangement of particles within the soil mass; the manner the particles are packed or distributed. Features such as layers, joints, fissures, slickensides, voids, pockets, cementation, etc., are part of the structure. Structure of soils is described by terms such as: undisturbed, disturbed, remoulded, compacted, cemented; flocculent, honey-combed, single-grained; flocculated, deflocculated; stratified, layered, laminated; isotropic and anisotropic.
4. Loading conditions: Effective stress path, i.e., drained, and undrained; and type of loading, i.e., magnitude, rate (static, dynamic), and time history (monotonic, cyclic).

== Undrained strength ==
This term describes a type of shear strength in soil mechanics as distinct from drained strength.

Conceptually, there is no such thing as the undrained strength of a soil. It depends on a number of factors, the main ones being:

- Orientation of stresses
- Stress path
- Rate of shearing
- Volume of material (like for fissured clays or rock mass)

It is commonly adopted in limit equilibrium analyses where the rate of loading is very much greater than the rate at which pore water pressure - generated due to the action of shearing the soil - dissipates. An example of this is rapid loading of sands during an earthquake, or the failure of a clay slope during heavy rain, and applies to most failures that occur during construction.

Undrained strength is typically defined by Tresca theory, based on Mohr's circle as:

$\sigma_1 - \sigma_3 = 2S_u$

Where:

$\sigma_1$ is the major principal stress

$\sigma_3$ is the minor principal stress

$\tau$ is the shear strength $\frac{\sigma_1-\sigma_3}{2}$

hence, $\tau$ = $S_u$ (or sometimes $c_u$), the undrained strength.

As an implication of undrained condition, no elastic volumetric strains occur, and thus Poisson's ratio is assumed to remain 0.5 throughout shearing. The Tresca soil model also assumes no plastic volumetric strains occur. This is of significance in more advanced analyses such as in finite element analysis. In these advanced analysis methods, soil models other than Tresca may be used to model the undrained condition including Mohr-Coulomb and critical state soil models such as the modified Cam-clay model, provided Poisson's ratio is maintained at 0.5.

One relationship used extensively by practising engineers is the empirical observation that the ratio of the undrained shear strength c to the original consolidation stress p' is approximately a constant for a given Over Consolidation Ratio (OCR). This relationship was first formalized by (Henkel 1960) and (Henkel & Wade 1966) who also extended it to show that stress-strain characteristics of remolded clays could also be normalized with respect to the original consolidation stress. The constant c/p relationship can also be derived from theory for both critical-state and steady-state soil mechanics (Joseph 2012). This fundamental, normalization property of the stress-strain curves is found in many clays, and was refined into the empirical SHANSEP (stress history and normalized soil engineering properties) method.(Ladd & Foott 1974).

== Drained shear strength ==
The drained shear strength is the shear strength of the soil when pore fluid pressures - generated during the course of shearing the soil - are able to dissipate during shearing. It also applies where no pore water exists in the soil (the soil is dry) and hence pore fluid pressures are negligible. It is commonly approximated using the Mohr-Coulomb equation. (It was called "Coulomb's equation" by Karl von Terzaghi in 1942.) (Terzaghi 1942) combined it with the principle of effective stress.

In terms of effective stresses, the shear strength is often approximated by:

$\tau = \sigma' tan(\phi') + c'$

Where $\sigma' = (\sigma - u)$, is defined as the effective stress. $\sigma$ is the total stress applied normal to the shear plane, and $u$ is the pore water pressure acting on the same plane.

$\phi'$ = the effective stress friction angle, or the 'angle of internal friction' after Coulomb friction. The coefficient of friction $\mu$ is equal to $tan(\phi')$. Different values of friction angle can be defined, including the peak friction angle, $\phi'_p$, the critical state friction angle, $\phi'_{cv}$, or residual friction angle, $\phi'_r$.

$c'$ = is called cohesion, however, it usually arises as a consequence of forcing a straight line to fit through measured values of $(\tau,\sigma')$ even though the data actually falls on a curve. The intercept of the straight line on the shear stress axis is called the cohesion. It is well known that the resulting intercept depends on the range of stresses considered: it is not a fundamental soil property. The curvature (nonlinearity) of the failure envelope occurs because the dilatancy of closely packed soil particles depends on confining pressure.

== Critical state theory ==
A more advanced understanding of the behaviour of soil undergoing shearing led to the development of the critical state theory of soil mechanics (Roscoe, Schofield & Wroth 1958). In critical state soil mechanics, a distinct shear strength is identified where the soil undergoing shear does so at a constant volume, also called the 'critical state'. Thus there are three commonly identified shear strengths for a soil undergoing shear:

- Peak strength $\tau$_{p}
- Critical state or constant volume strength $\tau$_{cv}
- Residual strength $\tau$_{r}

The peak strength may occur before or at critical state, depending on the initial state of the soil particles undergoing shear force:

- A loose soil will contract in volume on shearing, and may not develop any peak strength above critical state. In this case 'peak' strength will coincide with the critical state shear strength, once the soil has ceased contracting in volume. It may be stated that such soils do not exhibit a distinct 'peak strength'.
- A dense soil may contract slightly before granular interlock prevents further contraction (granular interlock is dependent on the shape of the grains and their initial packing arrangement). In order to continue shearing once granular interlock has occurred, the soil must dilate (expand in volume). As additional shear force is required to dilate the soil, a 'peak' strength occurs. Once this peak strength caused by dilation has been overcome through continued shearing, the resistance provided by the soil to the applied shear stress decreases (termed "strain softening"). Strain softening will continue until no further changes in volume of the soil occur on continued shearing. Peak strengths are also observed in overconsolidated clays where the natural fabric of the soil must be destroyed prior to reaching constant volume shearing. Other effects that result in peak strengths include cementation and bonding of particles.

The constant volume (or critical state) shear strength is said to be extrinsic to the soil, and independent of the initial density or packing arrangement of the soil grains. In this state the grains being separated are said to be 'tumbling' over one another, with no significant granular interlock or sliding plane development affecting the resistance to shearing. At this point, no inherited fabric or bonding of the soil grains affects the soil strength.

The residual strength occurs for some soils where the shape of the particles that make up the soil become aligned during shearing (forming a slickenside), resulting in reduced resistance to continued shearing (further strain softening). This is particularly true for most clays that comprise plate-like minerals, but is also observed in some granular soils with more elongate shaped grains. Clays that do not have plate-like minerals (like allophanic clays) do not tend to exhibit residual strengths.

Use in practice: If one is to adopt critical state theory and take c' = 0; $\tau$_{p} may be used, provided the level of anticipated strains are taken into account, and the effects of potential rupture or strain softening to critical state strengths are considered. For large strain deformation, the potential to form a slickensided surface with a φ'_{r} should be considered (such as pile driving).

The Critical State occurs at the quasi-static strain rate. It does not allow for differences in shear strength based on different strain rates. Also at the critical state, there is no particle alignment or specific soil structure.

Almost as soon as it was first introduced, the critical state concept was subjected to much criticism—chiefly its inability to match readily available test data from testing a wide variety of soils. This is primarily due to the theories inability to account for particle structure. A major consequence of this is its inability to model strain-softening post peak commonly observed in contractive soils that have anisotropic grain shapes/properties. Further, an assumption commonly made to make the model mathematically tractable is that shear stress cannot cause volumetric strain nor volumetric stress cause shear strain. Since this is not the case in reality, it is an additional cause of the poor matches to readily available empirical test data. Additionally, critical state elasto-plastic models assume that elastic strains drives volumetric changes. Since this too is not the case in real soils, this assumption results in poor fits to volume and pore pressure change data.

== Steady state (dynamical systems based soil shear) ==
A refinement of the critical state concept is the steady state concept.

The steady state strength is defined as the shear strength of the soil when it is at the steady state condition. The steady state condition is defined (Poulos 1981) as "that state in which the mass is continuously deforming at constant volume, constant normal effective stress, constant shear stress, and constant velocity." Steve J. Poulos, then an Associate Professor of the Soil Mechanics Department of Harvard University, built off a hypothesis that Arthur Casagrande was formulating towards the end of his career.(Poulos 1981) Steady state based soil mechanics is sometimes called "Harvard soil mechanics". The steady state condition is not the same as the "critical state" condition.

The steady state occurs only after all particle breakage if any is complete and all the particles are oriented in a statistically steady state condition and so that the shear stress needed to continue deformation at a constant velocity of deformation does not change. It applies to both the drained and the undrained case.

The steady state has a slightly different value depending on the strain rate at which it is measured. Thus the steady state shear strength at the quasi-static strain rate (the strain rate at which the critical state is defined to occur at) would seem to correspond to the critical state shear strength. However, there is an additional difference between the two states. This is that at the steady state condition the grains position themselves in the steady state structure, whereas no such structure occurs for the critical state. In the case of shearing to large strains for soils with elongated particles, this steady state structure is one where the grains are oriented (perhaps even aligned) in the direction of shear. In the case where the particles are strongly aligned in the direction of shear, the steady state corresponds to the "residual condition."

Three common misconceptions regarding the steady state are that a) it is the same as the critical state (it is not), b) that it applies only to the undrained case (it applies to all forms of drainage), and c) that it does not apply to sands (it applies to any granular material). A primer on the Steady State theory can be found in a report by Poulos (Poulos 1971). Its use in earthquake engineering is described in detail in another publication by Poulos (Poulos 1989).

The difference between the steady state and the critical state is not merely one of semantics as is sometimes thought, and it is incorrect to use the two terms/concepts interchangeably. The additional requirements of the strict definition of the steady state over and above the critical state viz. a constant deformation velocity and statistically constant structure (the steady state structure), places the steady state condition within the framework of dynamical systems theory. This strict definition of the steady state was used to describe soil shear as a dynamical system (Joseph 2012). Dynamical systems are ubiquitous in nature (the Great Red Spot on Jupiter is one example) and mathematicians have extensively studied such systems. The underlying basis of the soil shear dynamical system is simple friction (Joseph 2017).

== See also ==
- Civil engineering
- Direct shear test
- Dynamical systems theory
- Earthworks (engineering)
- Effective stress
- Geotechnical engineering
- Granular material
- Soil mechanics
- Soil stabilization
- Subsidence
- Triaxial shear test
