= Wendelin =

Wendelin is a male given name and a surname of Germanic origin meaning "wander" or "wanderer". In rare cases the name occurs as a female given name. Notable people with the name include:

== People ==
=== Given name ===
- Wendelin of Speyer, German printer from 1468 to 1477
- Saint Wendelin of Trier (554-617), hermit and abbot
- Wendelin Boeheim (1832–1900), Austrian army officer and weapons historian
- Wendelin Enders (1922–2019), German politician
- Wendelin Förster (1844–1915), Austrian philologist and Romance scholar
- Wendelin Grimm (1818–1890), American farmer
- Wendelin Mölzer (born 1980), Austrian politician
- Wendelin Moosbrugger (1760–1849), Austrian portrait painter and miniaturist
- Wendelin Joseph Nold (1900–1981), American Catholic bishop
- Wendelin Rauch (1885–1954), German Roman Catholic clergyman
- Wendelin Thannheimer (born 1999), German Nordic combined skier
- Wendelin Van Draanen (born 1965), American children's and young-adult fiction writer (female)
- Wendelin Weingartner (born 1937), Austrian politician
- Wendelin Weißheimer (1838–1910), German classical composer
- Wendelin Werner (born 1968), German-born French mathematician
- Wendelin Wiedeking (born 1952), German businessman
- Wendelin Wright, American materials scientist (female)

=== Surname ===
- Wendelin (surname)

== Places ==
- Wendelin Grimm Farmstead, United States historic place near Victoria, Minnesota
- Wendelin, Illinois, United States
- Wendelin, Ohio, United States

== See also ==
- Wend (disambiguation)
- Wende (disambiguation)
- Wendel (disambiguation)
- Wendell (disambiguation)
- Wendeline (disambiguation)
- Wendelinus (disambiguation)
- Wendl, a surname
- Wendling (disambiguation)
