= Moosbrugger =

Moosbrugger can refer to:

- Alexander Moosbrugger (born 1972), Austrian composer
- Frederick Moosbrugger (1900–1974), United States vice-admiral
- Friedrich Mosbrugger (1804–1830), German painter (also spelled Moosbrugger)
- Wendelin Moosbrugger (1760–1849), Austrian painter, father of Friedrich and Joseph.
- Christian Moosbrugger, a character in The Man Without Qualities by Robert Musil
- USS Moosbrugger (DD-980), a destroyer named after Frederick
