= Theodore Earl Butler =

American painter

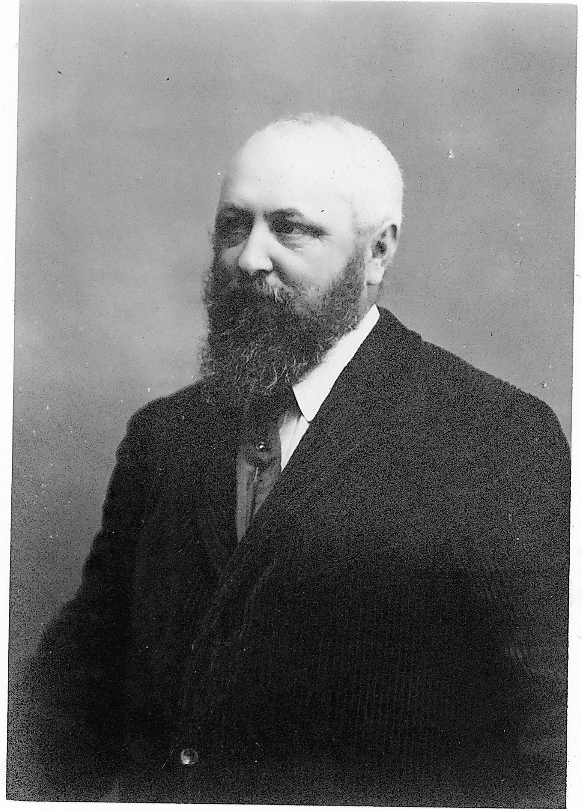
- Theodore Earl Butler, 1909
- Born: 1861; Columbus, Ohio
- Died: May 2, 1936 (aged 74–75); Giverny, France
- Known for: Watercolor, Painting
- Movement: American Impressionism

Theodore Earl Butler (1861–1936) was an American impressionist painter. He was born in Columbus, Ohio, and moved to Paris to study art. He befriended Claude Monet in Giverny, and married his stepdaughter, Suzanne Hoschedé. After her death he married her sister, Marthe Hoschedé. Butler was a founding member of the Society of Independent Artists.

Butler's chosen subjects were domestic scenes of family and friends and the French landscape. Although his Impressionistic approach to painting sometimes reflected the influence of his father-in-law, his work also suggests Post-Impressionist tendencies.

== Biography ==
Butler studied at Marietta College in Ohio and graduated in 1882. He studied at the Art Students League with James Carroll Beckwith, Kenyon Cox and J. Alden Weir, and under William Merritt Chase from 1884 to 1886. One of Butler's first paintings is a copy of Menippus by Diego Velázquez (1639–1641), Standing Bearded Man (1885). Butler then moved to study in Paris.

In Paris, Butler enrolled at La Grande-Chaumière, Académie Colarossi and at Académie Julian. Butler studied under Emile Carolus Duran. Carolus opened an art studio in 1873 on Boulevard Montparnasse, called the "81". Carolus, who was also known to have given free private lessons to some painters, introduced his students to the work of Claude Monet. Monet had moved to Giverny on April 29, 1883. Butler stayed for some time in the same building as Carolus, and Butler won an honorable mention in 1888 at the Paris Salon for a painting entitled "La Veuve", (the Widow).

=== Butler at Giverny ===
Butler signed the register under number 11 at Hotel Baudy in 1888 (May 20 – September 1888) along with Theodore Wendel, an Ohioan who also studied at Academy Julian. Butler stayed again at Hotel Baudy from October 1891 until July 21, 1892. Besides himself, other American painters who spent time in Giverny included John Leslie Breck, Frederick Carl Frieseke, Edmund Greacen, Philip Leslie Hale, Willard Metcalf, Lilla Cabot Perry, Theodore Robinson and Guy Rose. On July 3 Butler and Robinson had dinner at Monet's house.

Angelina and Lucien Baudy opened Hotel Baudy in June 1887. The hotel became the hub for many American expatriates. At Hotel Baudy, artists could buy canvases from Lefevre Foinet and American food celebrating Thanksgiving was served. The village began to attract a great deal of attention. According to Terra Museum historians Katherine M. Bourguignon and Vanessa Lecomte, over 350 painters from eighteen countries painted in Giverny.

An exhibition of foreign artists including Butler, Meteyard, Fox, Dice, Stasburg and Dawson Watson was organized from January 31, 1892 to February 1892.

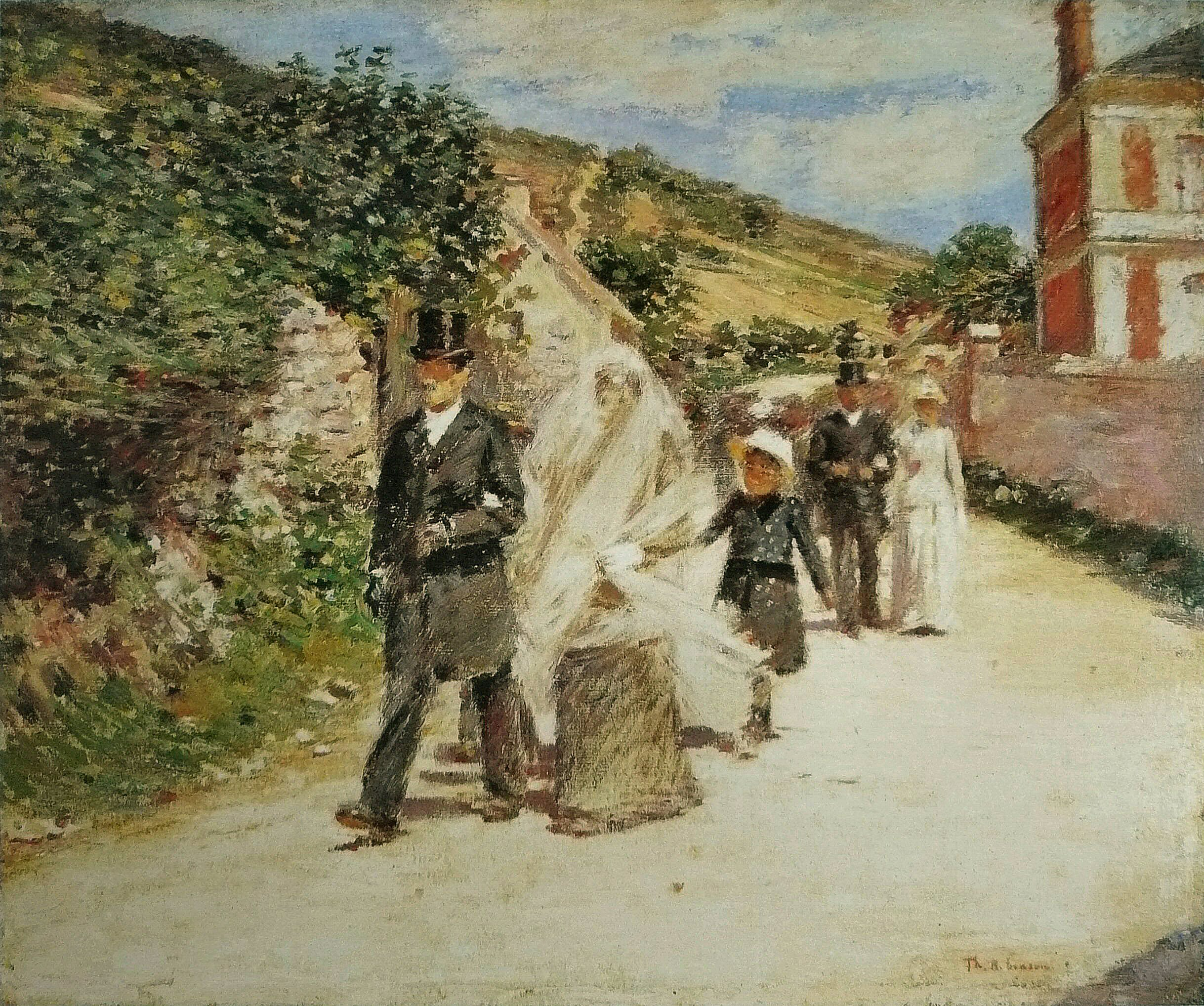
Theodore Robinson, The Wedding March, 1892. The wedding procession of Suzanne Hoschedé and Theodore Earl Butler.

After becoming close friends with Claude Monet, Butler married Monet's stepdaughter, Suzanne Hoschedé in 1892.

Suzanne is known as The woman with a Parasol and she was Claude Monet's favorite model. The event of their marriage is described by Theodore Robinson in his diaries as

a great day – The marriage of Butler and Mlle. Suzanne. Everybody nearly at the church – the peasants – many almost unrecognizable ... Monet entering first with Suzanne, then Butler and Mme. H (Hoschede). Considerable feeling on the part of the parents – a breakfast at the atelier – lasting most of the afternoon. Frequent showers, champagne and gaiety … Dinner and evening at the Monet's – bride and groom left at 7:3 for the Paris train.

The event was also immortalized in a painting by Theodore Robinson titled The Wedding March. Butler became a key player and link between the American Colony and Claude Monet. The Butler family organized many dinners such as one held October 25, 1892 with Robinson, Hale, Hart and Marthe Hoschedé. Butler decided to buy an orchard and built a new house. "We, Suzanne and Jimmy and I wish that you were here we'd like to see you first rate. I have been working some, about half as much as I should – perhaps less – We are building a house back of Peggy's in that little orchard you must remember. Said house is to be a wonder of elegance and taste – You will see it next year perhaps."

Theodore Earl Butler, Entrance to the Garden Gate, 1898

Butler participated in the publication and conception of the Courier Innocent. He did the cover and illustrated many pages. Butler painted a series of his own family: son Jimmy Butler born in 1893, and daughter Lilly Butler born in 1894. Those paintings included series entitled The Bath, After the Bath, and Playing with Jimmy. Butler developed his own impressionist style with light palettes and loose brushstrokes, reminiscent of works done by Édouard Vuillard and Pierre Bonnard. From his garden he painted landscapes showing the church of Giverny, The Demoiselles (small haystacks) and the grain stacks.

After a lingering illness, Suzanne Hoschede died in 1899. Thereafter most of Butler's paintings were landscapes. Marthe Hoschede, Suzanne's sister helped Butler raise Jimmy and Lilly. In 1899 Theodore Earl Butler decided to go back to the United States. A letter from Henry Prellwitz to Philip Leslie Hale indicated that Hart told him that Butler will sail on September 16 on La Touraine.

Butler had several one man shows in New York City. He exhibited in 1900 at Paul Durand-Ruel gallery in New York.

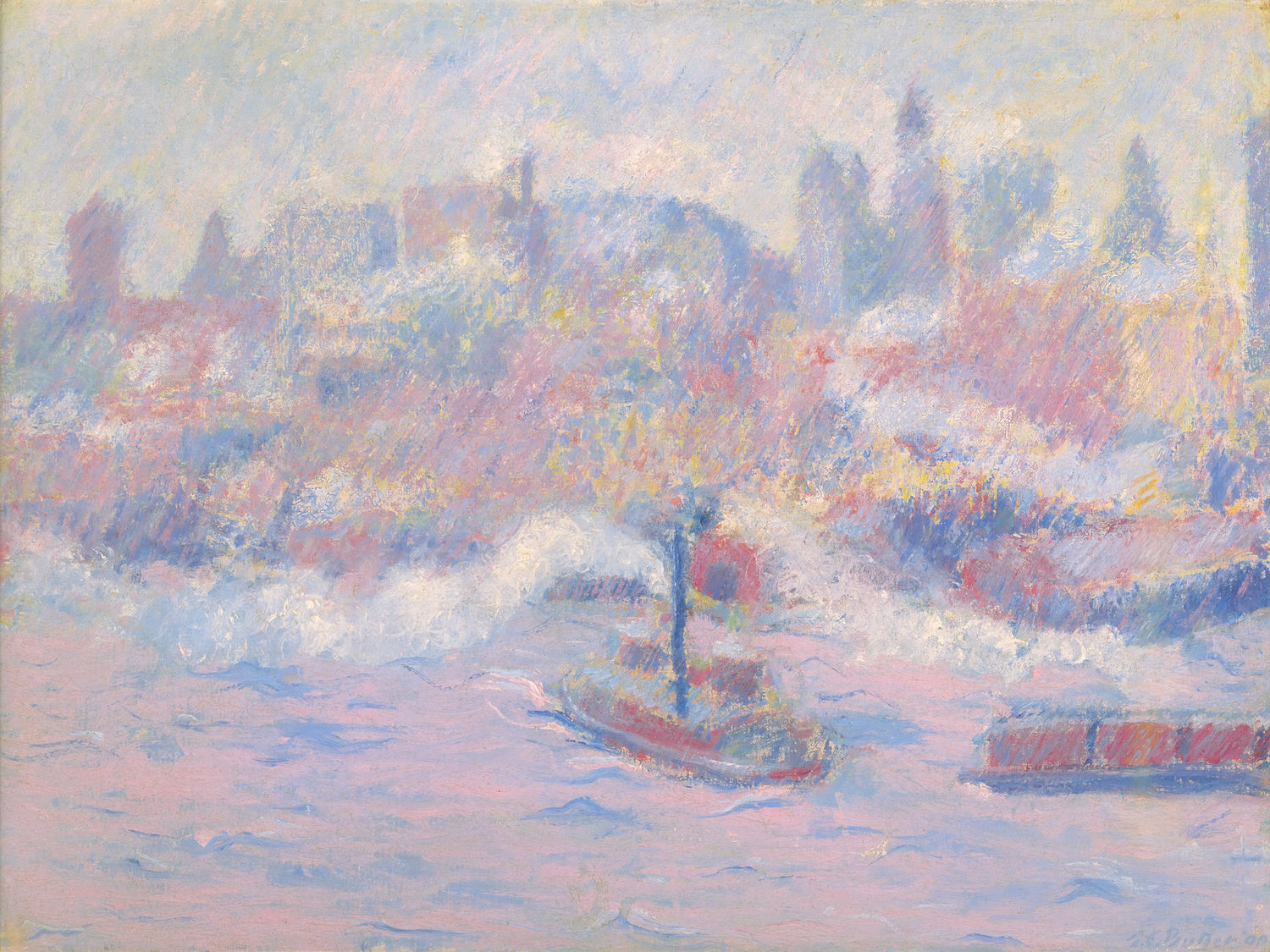
Theodore Earl Butler, East River, 1900

A critic wrote:

Mr. Butler moves in another sphere from common folk, and his retina must have a peculiar faculty for chromatic analysis ... There is an attempt to lift these excesses to an airy height by adding a poetic flavor in the titles as in No. 24. "Rain Clouds": but if the title is correct it must have been raining bricks, for there is no misty vapory thinness: everything is as solidly packed as a steamer trunk-hence the elevated conceit comes down with a dull thud. No 3 "A Floating Mist" and Nos. 5 and 11, showing the same haystack under the baptism of an opalescent and an autumn sunrise declare some better work. Claude Monet, the great luminarist, who proved at least to the world the reasonableness of his artistic conceptions may not be proud of his Giverny pupil who should rub up against some of his own American trees and get down out of the clouds.

After six months he was back in Giverny. He married Marthe Hoschedé, Suzanne's sister in 1900.

The Butler family and the Rose family, Ethel and Guy Rose, rented summer houses in Veules les Roses. Butler was also a close friend of Philip Hale, John Singer Sargent, and Maximilien Luce.

== Butler in the USA (1913–1921) ==
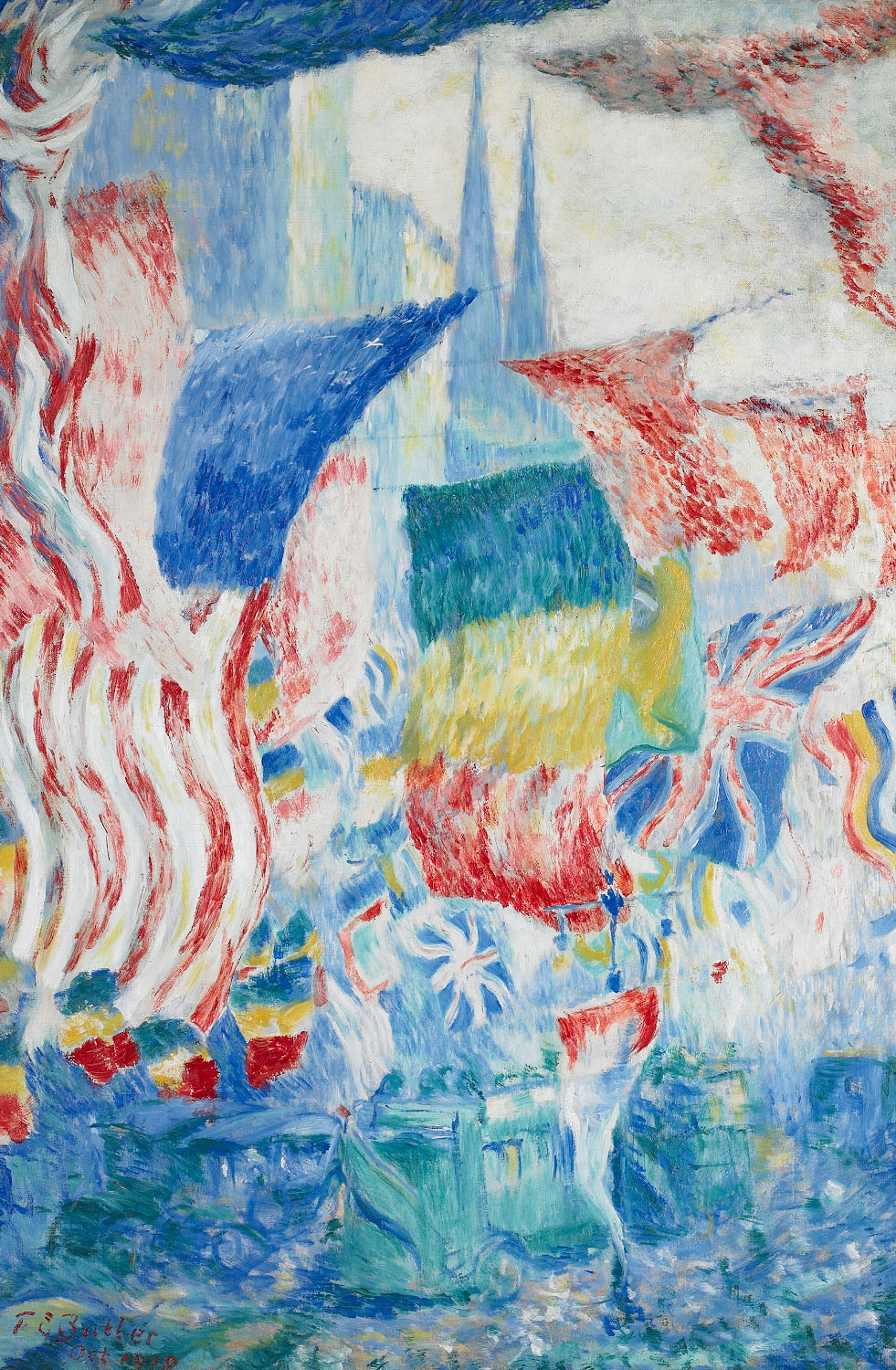
Theodore Earl Butler, Flags, 1918, depicts a display of Allied forces' flags on Fifth Avenue in New York City (Birmingham Museum of Art, Birmingham, Alabama).

In 1914, the Butler family moved to New York when Butler got a commission to paint mural panels for the home of William Paine. He contributed two paintings to the 1913 Armory Show in New York City, Marine and Fourteenth of July, Paris. He founded with his friend, John Sloan, the Society of Independent Artists and served on its board from 1918 to 1921. The breakout of World War I prevented Butler from returning to Giverny until 1921.

In the meantime, Butler became involved with the American Red Cross and raised funds with Marthe Hoschedé. He marked that occasion with a painting titled All Together.

== Work ==
From the time of his first marriage and after the birth of his children, Butler concentrated especially on domestic subjects, painted indoors or in his garden. Monet's influence on American expatriate painters in Giverny was important, and a similarity between Butler's palette and that of Monet has been noted in the paintings of the 1890s. Equally noticeable in Butler's brushwork are qualities that align him with the work of Paul Gauguin and the Nabis artists. In his later work Butler experimented further with Fauve principles, painting landscapes in Giverny and on the Normandy coast, sometimes applying color directly from the tube to decorative ends.

=== Ancestry ===
Theodore Earl Butler was the son of Courtland Philip Livingston Butler (1813–1891) and Elizabeth Slade Pierce (1822–1901). His son, James Butler, was also a painter, and as the grandson of Claude Monet, was one of only four painters to have painted in Monet's garden in Giverny. His sister Mary Elizabeth Sheldon, née Butler (1849–1897), was the paternal great grandmother of U.S. President George H. W. Bush and the great-great grandmother of U.S. President George W. Bush.
