= Wendall =

Wendall is a given name. Wendall (also used as a girl's name), is related to the Old German name Wendell. The meaning of Wendall is "wanderer". Notable people with the name include:

- Edward Wendall Kelly (1880–?), American Methodist bishop
- Chummy Broomhall (1919–2017), American cross country skier
- Wendall Williams (born 1990), American football player

== See also ==
- Wendel (disambiguation)
- Wendell (disambiguation)
