= Wendell (name) =

Wendell is an alternate spelling of Wendel, a surname of Germanic origin. It is also a masculine given name in the United States, often given to commemorate poet Oliver Wendell Holmes (1809–1894) or his son Oliver Wendell Holmes, Jr. (1841–1935), a famous justice of the U.S. Supreme Court. Wendell was the maiden name of Sarah Holmes, mother of Oliver Wendell Holmes.

Since about 1970 Wendell is a common given name in Brazil, where it has been borne by famous footballers. In the United States the popularity of the name peaked around 1940, then declined steadily after 1960.

Notable people with the name Wendell include:

== Given name ==
- Wendell Alexis (born 1964), American basketball player
- Wendell R. Anderson (1933–2016), American politician and ice hockey player
- Wendell Berry (born 1934), American novelist, poet, essayist and farmer
- Wendell Nascimento Borges (born 1993), Brazilian footballer
- Wendell Bryant (born 1980), American football player
- Wendell Butcher (1914–1988), American football player
- Wendell Burton (1947–2017), American actor and singer
- Wendell Carter Jr. (born 1999), American basketball player
- Wendell Ford (1924–2015), American politician
- Wendell James Franklin (1916–1994), African-American film executive
- Wendell Gregory (born 2006), American football player
- Wendell Johnson (1906–1965), American psychologist and author
- Wendell Lawrence (born 1967), Bahamian triple jumper
- Wendell Lucena Ramalho (1947–2022), Brazilian football goalkeeper and coach
- Wendell Moore (footballer) (born 1964), Trinidadian footballer
- Wendell Moore Jr. (born 2001), American basketball player
- Wendell F. Moore (1918–1969), American engineer and inventor
- Wendell H. Murphy, American politician
- Wendell Cushing Neville (1870–1930), American major general, Medal of Honor recipient and Commandant of the United States Marine Corps
- Wendell Phillips (1811–1884), American abolitionist and activist
- Wendell Phillips (archaeologist) (1921–1975), American archaeologist and oil magnate
- Wendell Pierce (born 1963), American actor
- Wendell Pritchett, American lawyer, legal scholar, professor and university administrator
- Wendell Ramos (born 1978), Filipino actor
- Wendell Sailor (born 1974), Australian dual-code rugby international
- Wendell Scott (1921–1990), American NASCAR driver, first African-American driver and team owner to compete and win in all divisions of NASCAR
- Wendell Smith (sportswriter) (1914–1972), African-American sportswriter
- Wendell Meredith Stanley (1904–1971), American Nobel Prize-winning biochemist and virologist
- Wendell Craig Williams, American politician, former Assistant United States Attorney and Marine Corps colonel
- Wendell Willkie (1892–1944), American Republican Party nominee for the 1940 US presidential election

== Surname ==
- Wendell (surname)

== Fictional characters ==
- Wendell Borton, a recurring character on the television series The Simpsons
- Mr. Wendell Hall, a character in the 1995 American coming-of-age teen comedy movie Clueless
- Wendell, from the cartoon series Mike, Lu, and Og
- Wendell Fidget, a recurring character on the television series Sofia the First
- Wendell Bray, one of the interns of Temperance Brennan from the series Bones
- Prince Wendell, one of the main characters in a miniseries The 10th Kingdom
- Oliver Wendell Jones, one of the main characters in the comic strip Bloom County
- Wendell, a main character in the Netflix movie Wendell and Wild
- Agent Wendell Pleakley, a main character in the Lilo & Stitch franchise; his first name was changed from "Wendy" in the franchise's animated continuity to "Wendell" for the 2025 live-action Lilo & Stitch film

== See also ==
- Wendel (disambiguation)
