= Wendel (given name) =

Wendel is a given name. Notable people with the name include:

- Wendel Clark (born 1966), Canadian ice hockey player
- Wendel Meldrum (1954–2021), Canadian actress
- Wendel (footballer, born 1981), full name Wendel Santana Pereira Santos, Brazilian football defensive midfielder and wingback
- Wendel (footballer, born 1982), full name Wendel Geraldo Maurício e Silva, Brazilian football midfielder
- Wendel (footballer, born 1984), full name Wendel Raul Gonçalves Gomes, Brazilian football defensive midfielder
- Wendel (footballer, born 1991), full name Wendel Alex dos Santos, Brazilian football attacking midfielder
- Wendel (footballer, born 1997), full name Marcus Wendel Valle da Silva, Brazilian football midfielder
- Wendel (footballer, born 2000), full name Wendel da Silva Costa, Brazilian football forward
- Wendel (footballer, born 2001), full name Wendel da Silva Ramos, Brazilian football midfielder

== See also ==
- Wendel (Swedish family), a Swedish noble family
- de Wendel family, a family of industrialists from Lorraine, France
- Wendl, surname
- Wendell (name)
- Wendle, surname
- Wendela
