= Wendelinus =

Wendelinus is a name that can refer to:

- Wendelinus der Heilige (Wendelin of Trier; died 617), saint
- Godefridus Wendelinus (Godefroy Wendelin; 1580–1667), Flemish astronomer
- Marcus Friedrich Wendelin (Marcus Fridericus Wendelinus; 1584–1652), German Reformed educator and theologian

== See also ==
- Wendel (disambiguation)
- Wendelin
