= Wendelin (surname) =

Wendelin or Wendelen is a surname, and may refer to:

- Godfried Wendelen (1580–1667), Flemish astronomer and Catholic priest
- Marcel Wendelin (born 1939), German sprinter
- Marcus Friedrich Wendelin (Marcus Fridericus Wendelinus; 1584–1652), German Reformed educator and theologian
- Martta Wendelin (1893–1986), Finnish artist
- Rudy Wendelin (1910–2000), United States Forest Service artist

== See also ==
- Wendel (surname)
- Wendelinus
