= Wendell =

Wendell may refer to:

== Places in the United States ==
- Wendell, Idaho
- Wendell, Massachusetts
- Wendell, Minnesota
- Wendell, North Carolina

== People and fictional characters ==
- Wendell (name), a list of people and fictional characters with the given name or surname
- Wendell (footballer, born 1947) (1947–2022), full name Wendell Lucena Ramalho, Brazilian football manager and former goalkeeper
- Wendell (footballer, born 1989), full name Wendell Nogueira de Araújo, Brazilian football midfielder
- Wendell (footballer, born 1993), full name Wendell Nascimento Borges, Brazilian football left-back
- Wendell (footballer, born 2002), full name Wendell Fernandes da Silva, Brazilian football midfielder
- Wendell (footballer, born 2004), full name Wendell Gabriel Mendes Craveiro, Brazilian football player
- Wendell (footballer, born 2006), full name Wendell Florencio Brito, Brazilian football player

== See also ==
- Wendel (disambiguation)
