= Feurich =

German piano company

Feurich Pianoforte GmbH
- Company type: Privately held company
- Industry: Musical instruments
- Founded: 1851; 175 years ago
- Founder: Julius Gustav Feurich
- Headquarters: Vienna, Austria
- Products: Pianos
- Website: feurich.com/en

Feurich (Feurich Pianoforte GmbH) is a piano company founded in 1851 in Leipzig, Germany, by Julius Gustav Feurich, which has been family operated for five generations. The company is renowned for the quality of its pianos.

Since 2011, Feurich has been owned by the Austrian piano manufacturer formerly known as Wendl & Lung, and the bulk of its manufacturing is carried out in China, except for the upright piano 123 – Vienna, which is manufactured in Vienna, Austria. In 2021, Feurich – Wendl&Lung GmbH was renamed Feurich Pianoforte GmbH.

== History ==
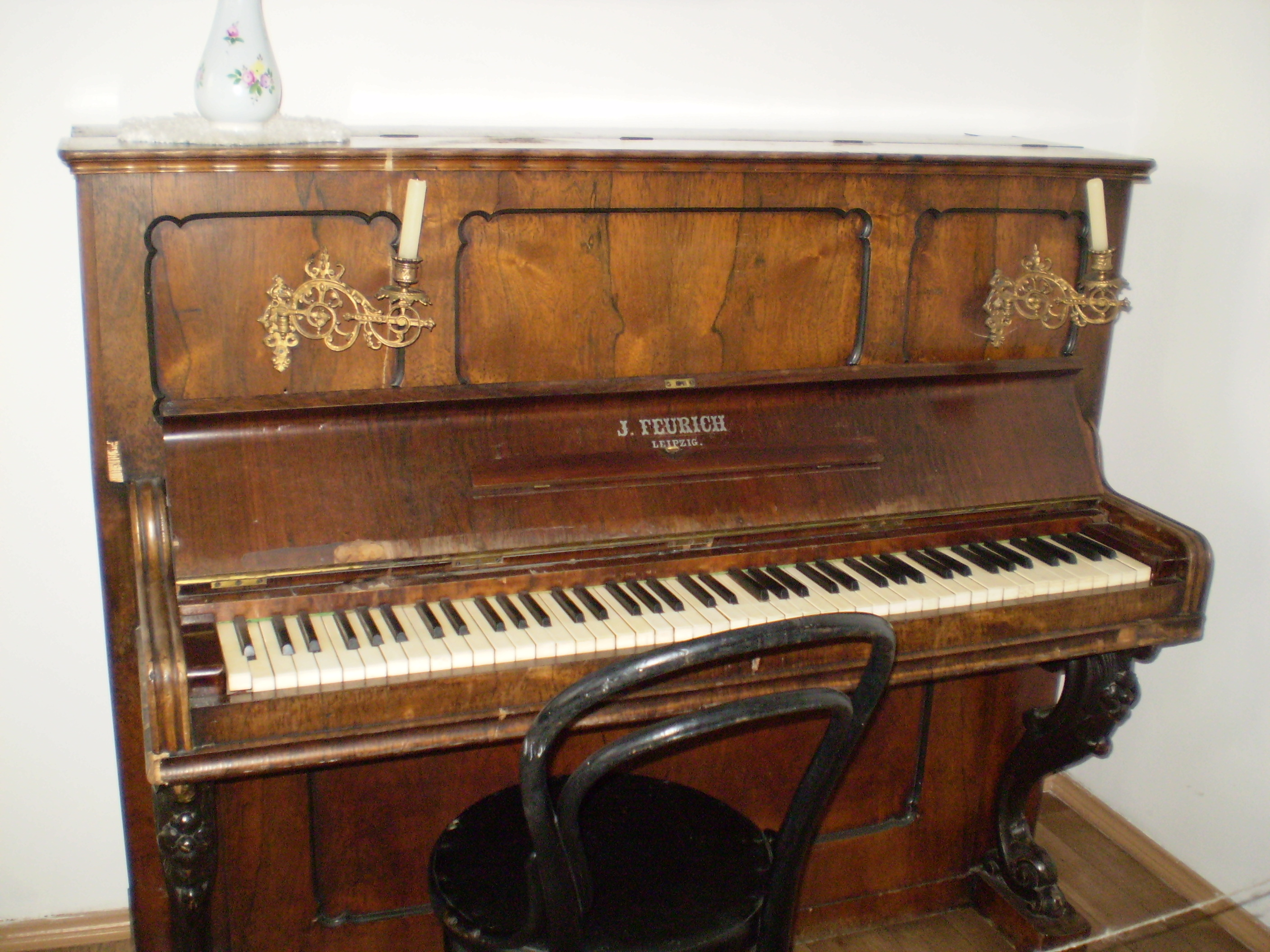
J. Feurich piano (Museum of History, Ulan-Ude, Eastern Siberia).

Artisanal piano making has a long tradition in Saxony. The city of Leipzig was, along with Paris, London, and Vienna, one of the pillars of European musical culture and music capital of the German Empire. In addition to its great cultural heritage, the metropolis was also an excellent trading venue with a lot of national contacts and a prosperous middle class. Here Julius Gustav Feurich founded the piano factory, Feurich, in 1851.

By 1860, more than 400 instruments were manufactured and sold. Julius Feurich worked to expand his business and in the following years a larger and more modern factory was built allowing for ever greater quantities to be produced. By the turn of the twentieth century, nearly 14,000 uprights and grand pianos were manufactured.

The owner Hermann Feurich was awarded an imperial and royal warrant of appointment to the court of Austria-Hungary.

In the 1930s, Feurich was one of the greatest German piano companies. During World War II, Leipzig was (like almost all major cities in Germany) bombed heavily and the factory was destroyed. After the war, as East Germany was behind the Iron Curtain during Germany's partition, exports went to nearly zero. The factory was re-located to the outskirts of Gunzenhausen (West Germany) in 1959.

In 2011, Feurich was sold to Wendl & Lung, similar to Feurich's and their successor firm a traditional piano manufacturer based in Vienna, Austria. Wendl & Lung picked up Feurich pianos again, based on the same constructions as before. Wendl & Lung models were also renamed as Feurich.

Feurich grand pianos and upright pianos are produced at Hailun Piano Company factory in Ningbo (PR China) with the exception of the upright piano 123 – Vienna made in Vienna, Austria.

== Current Grand Piano Models ==
Model	Length	Weight
162 – Dynamic I	162 cm	322 kg
179 – Dynamic II	179 cm	350 kg
218 – Concert I	218 cm	390 kg

== Current Upright Piano Models ==
Model	Height	Weight
115 – Premiere	115 cm	212 kg
122 – Universal	122 cm	220 kg
125 – Design	125 cm	220 kg
133 – Concert	133 cm	270 kg
123 – Vienna	123 cm	250 kg
