= Wendel (surname) =

Wendel is a surname. Notable people with the surname include:

- Abraham Jacobus Wendel (1926–1915), Dutch lithographer, draughtsman and illustrator
- Ben Wendel (born 1976), Canadian jazz musician
- Christian Wendel (born 1980), German politician
- Elisabeth Moltmann-Wendel (1926–2016), German feminist theologian
- Elmarie Wendel (1928–2018), American actress and singer
- Ernst Wendel (1876–1938), German violinist and conductor
- Frederick Wendel (1886–1960), German journalist
- Fritz Wendel (1915–1975), German test pilot
- Hilde Wendel (born 1996), Dutch politician
- Jean-Martin Wendel (1665–1737), French ironmaster
- Johnathan Wendel (born 1981), American professional esports player, handle Fatal1ty
- Jonathan F. Wendel, American evolutionary biologist and botanist
- Joseph Wendel (1901–1960), German Cardinal
- Josephine (singer) (born 1990) Greek singer
- Kevin R. Wendel (born 1957), United States Army general
- Lara Wendel (born 1965), German-Italian actress
- Moshe Wendel, American chef
- Ngudia Wendel (born 1940), Angolan Portuguese-language poet
- Ole Christian Wendel (born 1992), Norwegian cross-country skier and ski jumper
- Per Wendel (1947–2005), Swedish journalist
- Reinhold Wendel (1910–1945), German racing cyclist
- Theodore Wendel (1859–1932), American artist
- Tim Wendel (footballer) (born 1989), German footballer
- Tim Wendel (writer) (born 1956), American writer

== See also ==
- Wendel (Swedish family), a Swedish noble family
- de Wendel family, a family of industrialists from Lorraine, France
- Wendell (surname)
- Wendl
- Wendelin (surname)
