= Wendle =

Wendle is a surname. Notable people with the surname include:

- Annika Wendle (born 1997), German wrestler
- Joey Wendle (born 1990), American baseball player

== See also ==
- Wendel (disambiguation)
- Weddle, a surname
