= Wendling =

Wendling may refer to:

== Places ==
- Wendling, Grieskirchen, Upper Austria, Austria
- Wendling, Braunau am Inn, in Kirchberg bei Mattighofen, Upper Austria, Austria
- Wendling, Salzburg, in Seekirchen am Wallersee, Austria
- Wendling, Norfolk, England
  - Wendling railway station
  - RAF Wendling, a former World War II airfield in Norfolk
- Wendling, California, a former town in California
- Wendling, Oregon, a former town in Oregon

== Family name ==
- Dorothea Wendling (1736–1811), German soprano, wife of Johann Baptist
- Elisabeth Wendling (1746–1786), German soprano
- Isabelle Wendling (born 1971), French handball player
- Jean Wendling (born 1934), French footballer
- Johann Baptist Wendling (1723–1797), German flutist and composer, husband of Dorothea
- John Wendling (born 1983), American football player
- Karl Wendling (1875–1962), German violinist
- Karl Wendling (pianist) (1857–1918), German pianist
- Pete Wendling (1888–1974), American composer and pianist
