= Wendl & Lung =

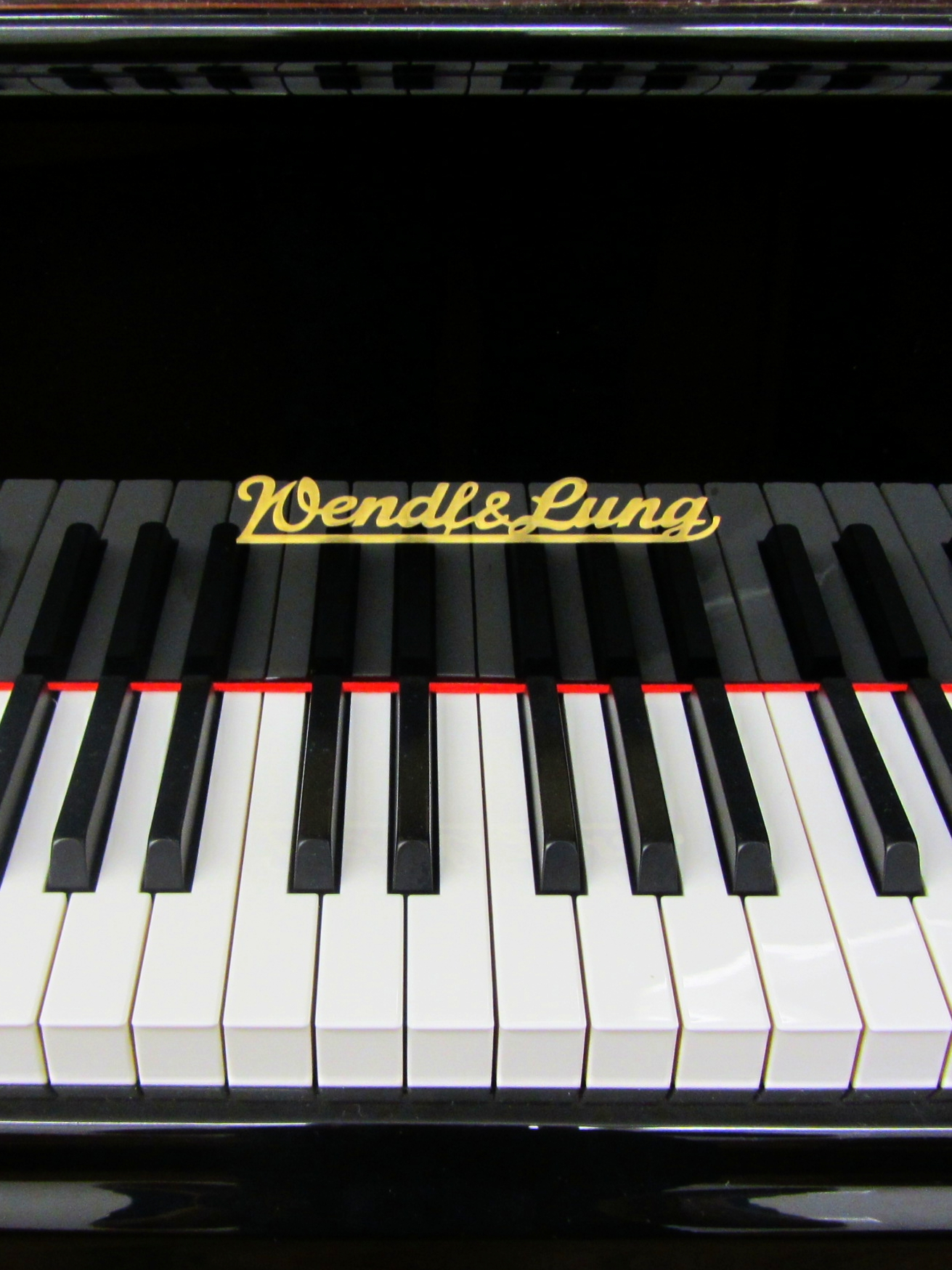
Wendl & Lung Grand Piano keyboard

Wendl & Lung is a piano-manufacturing company based in Vienna, widely regarded for their product.

The Wendl & Lung brand started in 1910 as a collaboration between Stefan Lung and Johann Wendl in Vienna, Austria. From around 1930 onwards the company seems to have moved towards piano rebuilding and restoration.

Peter Veletzky, great-grandson of Stefan Lung, took over the business in 1994. In 1999 he became technical advisor to various piano manufacturers in China. This relationship was developed via the Chinese wife of Ernest Bittner, who formed a business partnership with Veletzky in 2000.

Two grand piano models were introduced in 2004: the 161 cm Professional I and the 178 cm Professional II. Additional grand models are expected to start commercial production in late 2007 (218 and 288 cm), with further models planned. Various technical innovations, such as a double repeat mechanism (even if the result can be discussed) and a harmonic pedal have been introduced in collaboration with other piano technicians.

In 2011, after the acquisition of the German piano manufacturing company Feurich, all Wendl & Lung piano models were renamed Feurich.

In 2021 Feurich - Wendl&Lung GmbH was renamed Feurich Pianoforte GmbH.
