= John Leslie Breck =

American artist (1860–1899)

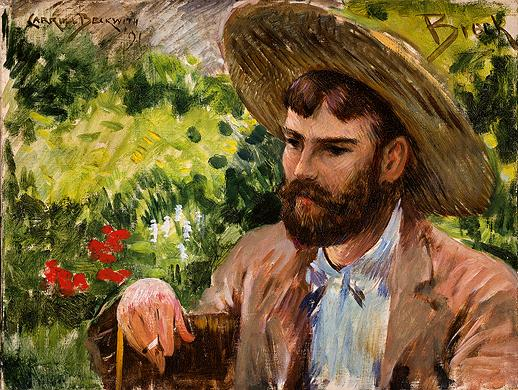
John Leslie Breck, by James Carroll Beckwith.

John Leslie Breck (1860–1899) was an American artist who died at the age of 38. During his short life he painted a number of notable works, and is credited with introducing Impressionism to the United States with a show in Boston in 1890. He died in 1899, reported as death by asphyxiation from lighting gas poisoning, and is interred in Forest Hills Cemetery in Boston. His works remain in a number of American museums and private collections.

== Life and work ==
Breck was born off Hong Kong at sea in 1860, the son of a US naval officer. Returning to the United States, he grew up in Newton, Massachusetts, where he attended the Governor’s Academy for a year before matriculating from St. Mark's School in 1877. Following his graduation, the young artist studied painting at the Royal Academy of Fine Arts in Munich. Breck returned to Boston in 1882 and spent the next part of his career painting in New England.

In 1886, John Leslie Breck returned to Europe to study in Paris at the Académie Julian. While at school, Breck established many connections that would impact his artistic style. He studied under Gustave Boulanger and Jules-Joseph Lefebvre, and met some fellow American artists studying abroad. In 1887 Breck, along with fellow American artists Willard Metcalf and Theodore Robinson, traveled to Giverny, France, home of the impressionist master Claude Monet, where he was befriended by Claude Monet. Breck introduced Impressionism to the United States in 1890.

Breck by then had already absorbed both the formal aspects of Dutch Mastery. At Giverny he learned and adopted Monet's Impressionist style and techniques.

Despite some success exhibiting in the Salon in 1888 and 1889, Breck left Paris after breaking up with Monet’s stepdaughter, Blanche Hoschédé-Monet.

== Legacy ==
Upon his return to Boston in 1890 he exhibited at the St. Botolph Club in 1890. At that show, and with his remaining paintings of the period, one can note that the atmospheric perspective and vibrant colors of his landscapes of Massachusetts, Giverny, and Venice demonstrate not only his great talent as a landscape artist but his integration into the great artistic movement of Impressionism. He died in 1899.

There is a notable 1891 portrait of Breck in France by his friend James Carroll Beckwith on permanent exhibition at the National Gallery of Art, in Washington, D.C.

The John Leslie Breck fund, a legacy of the artist's estate, at St. Mark's School continues to support the fine arts there.
