= Joseph Moosbrugger =

German landscape painter

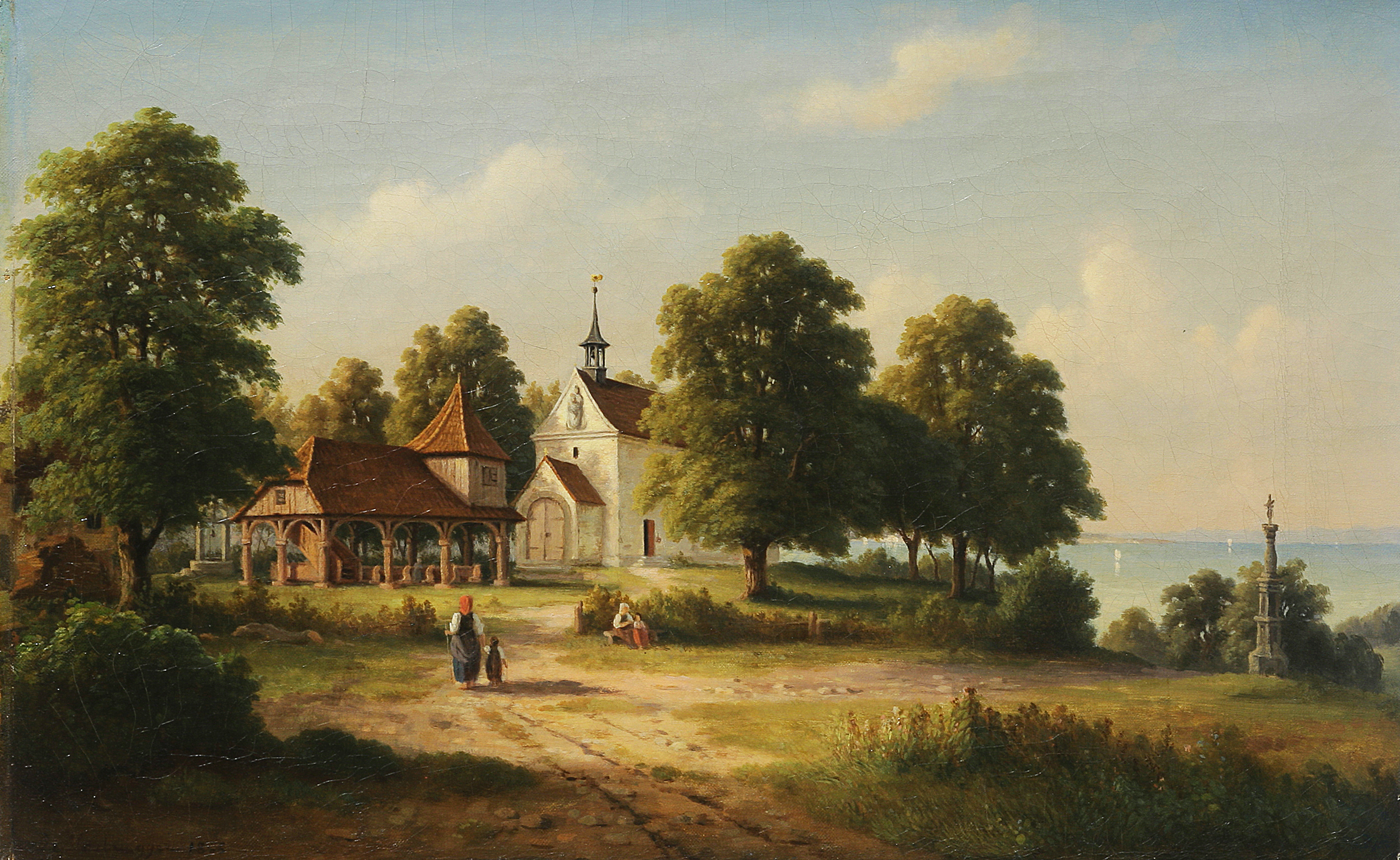
Lorettokapelle in Konstanz

Joseph Moosbrugger (10 March 1810 – 13 October 1869) was a German landscape painter. His name is sometimes given as Josef Mosbrugger.

== Biography ==
He was born in Konstanz. He was the sixth and last child born to the painter, Wendelin Moosbrugger, and his second wife, Anna Maria, née Hüetlin (1774–1829). His brother, Friedrich, also became a painter, while his brother August was an architect. His half-brother, Leopold, was a noted mathematician. The family was very active in local society circles, with many friends among the rich and influential. Summers at the family's estate gave him an early appreciation for nature.

Although he showed an interest in becoming an artist, he was a very poor student, so he worked as an apprentice with his father. His spare time was spent making sketches in the countryside. With the intent of becoming a portrait painter, he followed Friedrich to Munich where, in 1829, he enrolled in classes at the Academy of Fine Arts. He was only moderately successful, as his poor study habits quickly reasserted themselves, and he spent most of his time socializing. It soon became clear that he would not be successful in his desired field.

Under the influence of his friend, Eduard Schleich, he turned to landscape painting instead. Schleich also worked to promote his friend's paintings, and introduce him to the work of other artists, including Georg von Dillis, Heinrich Bürkel, and Wilhelm von Kobell. He also made numerous excursions throughout the region, seeking his own inspiration. Although he was able to earn a decent income, financial hardship was never far away. Plans to participate in the Exposition Universelle of 1855 did not work out. He was awarded a few commissions from the Grand Ducal court, but found no permanent patrons. In 1856, he returned to Konstanz.

Following the death of an old family acquaintance, Ignaz Heinrich von Wessenberg, he was appointed to succeed him as Curator of what is now known as the Städtische Wessenberg-Galerie. In 1863, he took the collection's first inventory, and published a catalog in 1866.

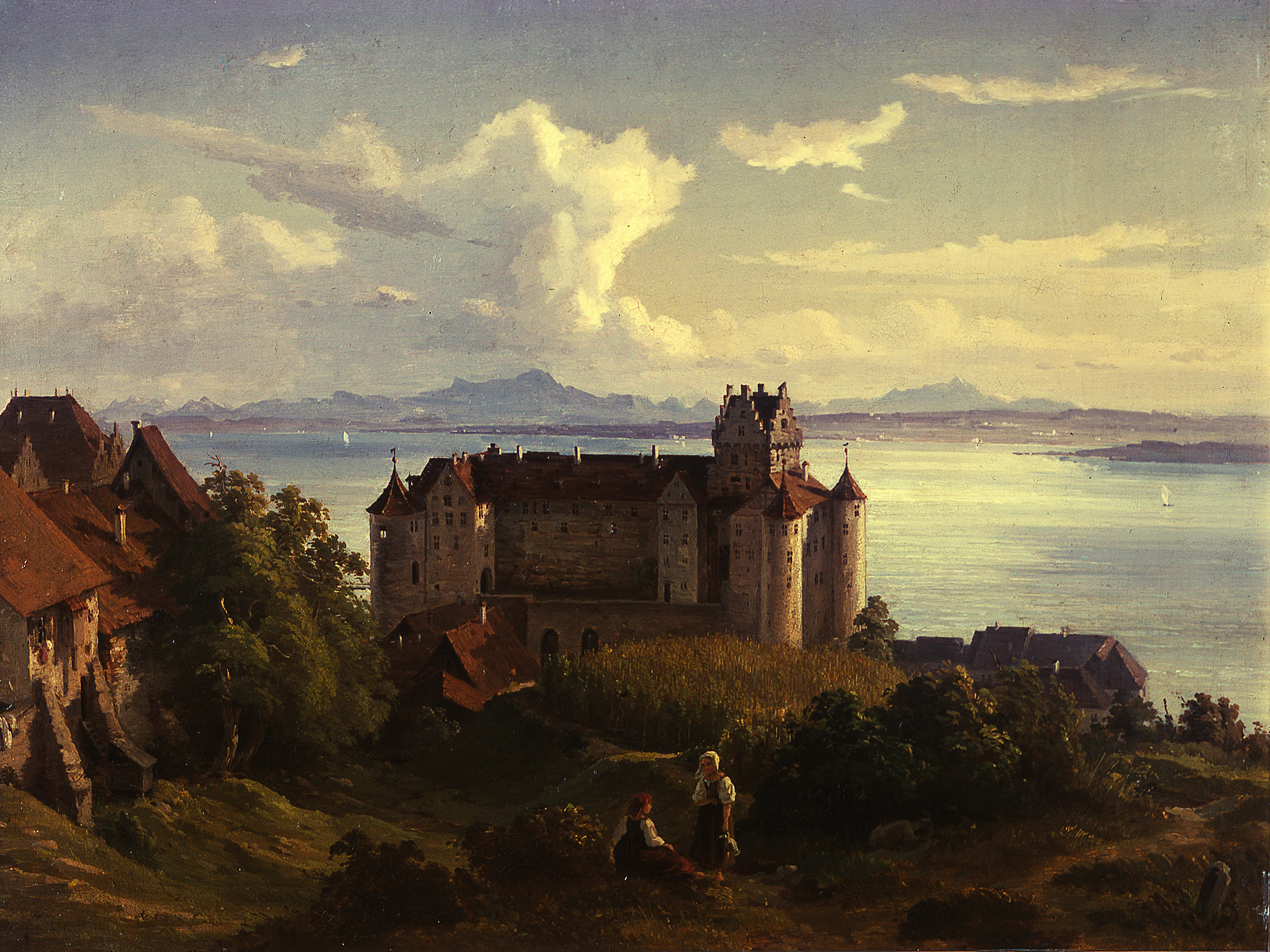
View of Lake Constance from Meersburg

Early in 1869, he fell ill with a lung disease, and was hospitalized until his death later that year, in Konstanz.
