= Friedrich Mosbrugger =

German painter

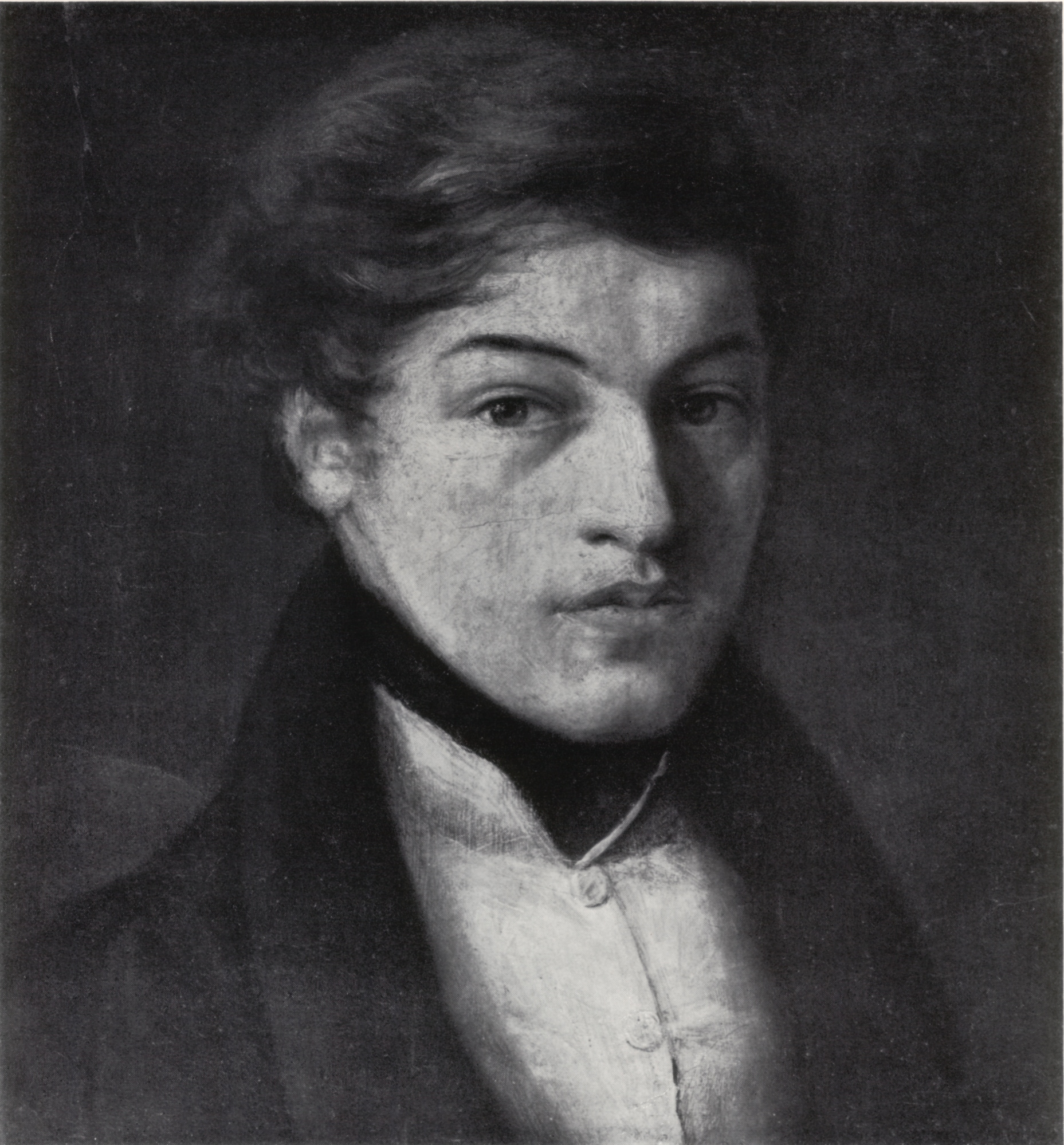
Self-portrait (c.1820/22)

Friedrich Mosbrugger, also known as Fritz Moosbrugger (19 September 1804, in Konstanz – 17 October 1830, in Saint Petersburg) was a German portrait and genre painter in the Realistic style. He came from a family that had a widespread reputation as builders, plasterers and painters. His brother Joseph was also a painter, and his brother August was an architect.

== Life ==
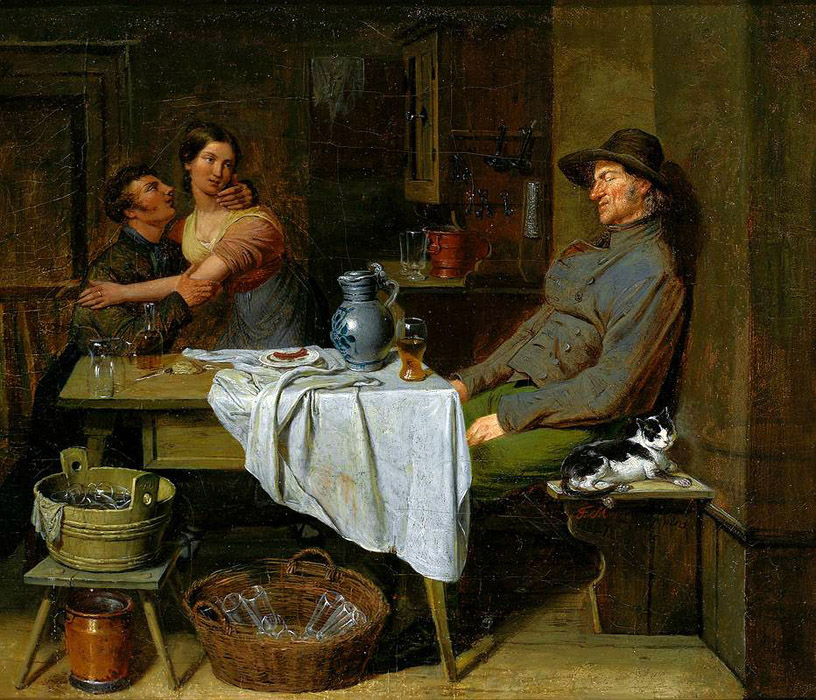
Sleeping Grandfather and Hugging Couple (1827)

His father was Wendelin Moosbrugger, a Court Painter for Frederick I of Württemberg. He received his first lessons from his father and another painter from Konstanz, Marie Ellenrieder, then studied at the Academy of Fine Arts, Munich, with Johann Peter von Langer

After displaying some paintings at an exhibition in Karlsruhe in 1827, he followed his friend, the architect Friedrich Eisenlohr, to Italy and became a part of the German circle of artists resident in Rome. While there, he sought the opinions and advice of Joseph Anton Koch regarding his work. In the summer of 1828, he made landscape studies in the Sabine Hills. He returned to Germany in 1829 and staged an exhibition of his Italian works in 1830.

With a letter of recommendation to Tsar Nicholas I from William I of Württemberg, he embarked on a trip to Russia. He took passage on a merchant vessel at Lübeck, as land travel through Russia would have been difficult and circuitous at that time. The ship made frequent stops, so the voyage took three weeks, during which time he was almost constantly seasick. He remained sick upon his arrival and languished for a week without care, until he was visited by an old friend, Paul Emil Jacobs. It was too late, however, and he died, aged only twenty-six.
