= Theodore Wendel =

American artist (1859–1932)

- Born: Theodore Wendel; 1859; Midway, Ohio, United States
- Died: 1932 (aged 72–73); Ipswich, Massachusetts, United States
- Citizenship: American
- Education: McMicken School of Design; Royal Academy, Munich; Académie Julian
- Known for: Painting
- Notable work: Winter at Ipswich, Giverny Farm
- Movement: Impressionism

Theodore Wendel (1859–1932) was an American Impressionist painter known for his landscape paintings of the Massachusetts coast and countryside. He was among the first American artists to study at Giverny alongside Claude Monet and played a significant role in bringing French Impressionism to the United States.

== Early life and education ==
Wendel was born in 1859 in Midway, Ohio, to German immigrant parents. As a youth, he briefly worked as a circus acrobat before pursuing his interest in art. He studied at the McMicken School of Design at the University of Cincinnati under Thomas Noble, where he formed a lifelong friendship with fellow artist Joseph DeCamp.

In 1878, Wendel traveled to Munich, Germany, where he enrolled at the Royal Academy. There he joined the circle of American artists around the influential painter Frank Duveneck, becoming one of the group known as the "Duveneck Boys." From 1878 to 1880, Wendel painted with this group in various European locations, including Polling, Bavaria, Florence, and Venice, working primarily in the dark realist style characteristic of the Munich School.

== Career ==
=== Giverny period ===
Wendel returned to the United States in 1882, living briefly in Newport, Rhode Island, New York City, and Cincinnati before moving to Boston in 1883. He returned to Europe in 1886 to study at the Académie Julian in Paris. During the summers of 1887 and 1888, he traveled to Giverny, France, where he became part of the first wave of American artists to paint alongside Claude Monet. Working with fellow Americans Theodore Robinson, Willard Metcalf, and John Leslie Breck, Wendel adopted the lighter palette and atmospheric effects of French Impressionism, moving away from his earlier Munich training.

Monet was among the few who praised Wendel's work during this period, and Wendel became known as one of the "most French" of American Impressionist painters, alongside Theodore Robinson and Childe Hassam.

=== Boston and teaching ===
Returning to Boston in 1889, Wendel held an important exhibition that helped introduce French Impressionism to American audiences. During the 1890s, he taught at Wellesley College and the Cowles Art School, while maintaining an active exhibition schedule. He showed his work at prestigious venues including the Cincinnati Art Museum, the Corcoran Gallery, the Pennsylvania Academy of the Fine Arts, the Society of American Artists, and the National Academy of Design.

In 1897, Wendel married Philena Stone, one of his students. Following their wedding, the couple made an extended trip to France and Italy before returning to the United States.

=== Ipswich period ===
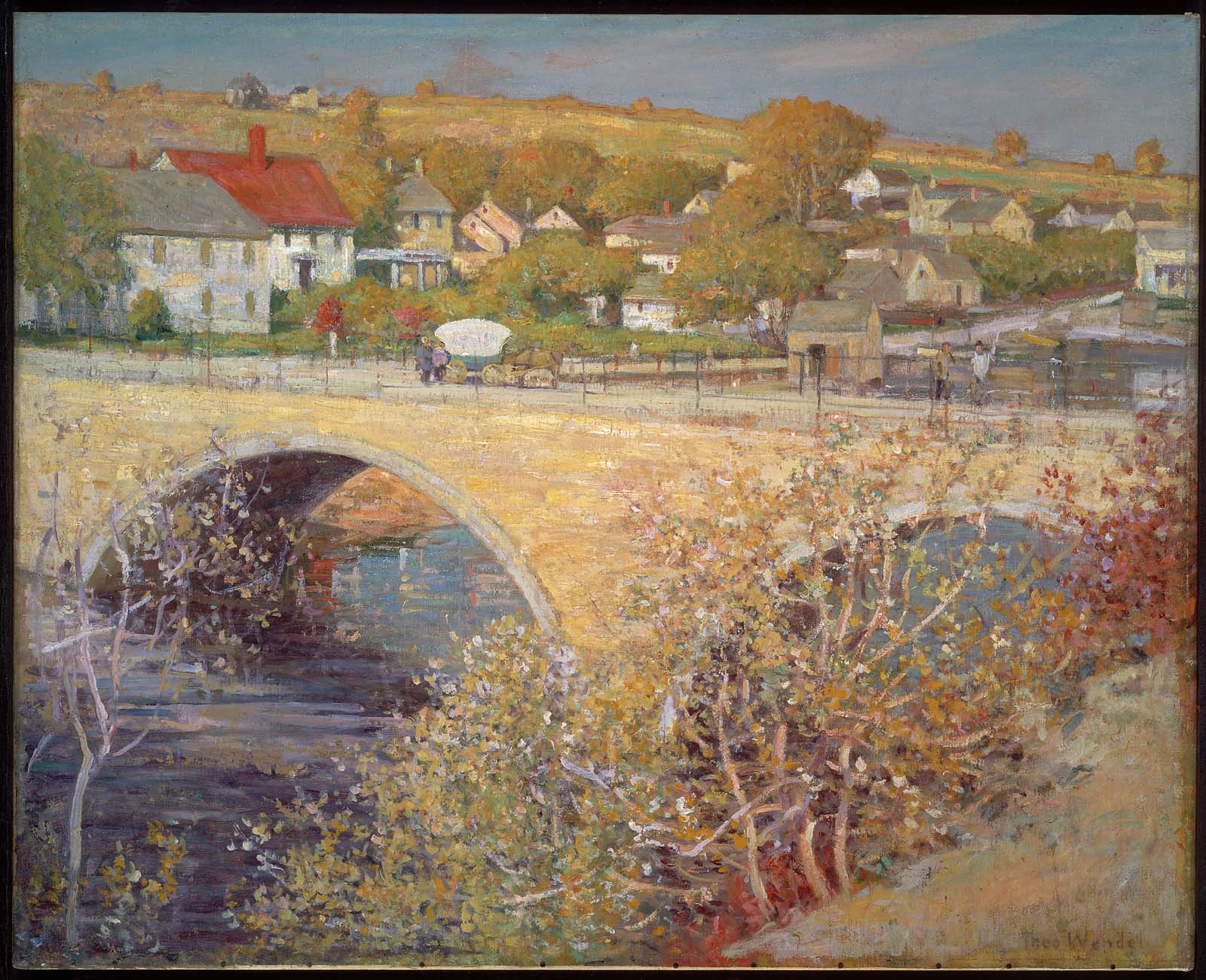
Theodore Wendel - Bridge at Ipswich

In 1899, Wendel and his wife settled on a large family farm in Ipswich, Massachusetts, which she had inherited. While he maintained a studio in Boston's Harcourt Building, Ipswich became the primary focus of his artistic work for the next three decades. He painted the local landscape extensively, depicting farms, marshlands, orchards, and the town itself in all seasons. He also spent time painting in nearby Gloucester, Massachusetts.

Wendel's Ipswich paintings represent his mature Impressionist style, characterized by vibrant color, vigorous brushwork, and plein air painting techniques. His work from this period earned significant recognition, including the prestigious Jennie Sesnan Gold Prize from the National Academy of Design in 1908 for his painting Winter at Ipswich, which was acquired for the Academy's permanent collection.

=== Later life ===
In 1917, Wendel suffered a severe infection of the jaw that significantly curtailed his painting career. Although he recovered physically, he produced little work during his final years. He maintained connections with the Boston art community and spent his remaining years between Ipswich and Boston. Many of his early paintings were destroyed in a fire at his Boston studio in 1904.

Wendel died in 1932 at his home in Ipswich at 23 High Street. At the time of his death, he was described by the Boston Globe as "one of the best known American landscape painters."

== Legacy and rediscovery ==
Despite his success during his lifetime, Wendel's work fell into relative obscurity after his death. His paintings were largely held by family members and not publicly exhibited for decades. In 1976, the Whitney Museum of American Art in New York organized the exhibition "Theodore Wendel: An American Impressionist, 1859-1932," coordinated by the artist's son Daniel Wendel and John I. H. Baur, the museum's director emeritus. This exhibition reintroduced Wendel's work to the art world and began the process of establishing his reputation as one of the leading American Impressionists.

More recent exhibitions, including a 2019-2020 show at Vose Galleries in Boston titled "Bringing to Light: Theodore Wendel," have continued to elevate his recognition. In 2019, The Artist Book Foundation published a comprehensive monograph, Theodore Wendel: True Notes of American Impressionism, authored by art historian Laurene Buckley with an introduction by William H. Gerdts.

== Collections ==
Wendel's work is held in numerous public collections, including:

- National Academy of Design, New York
- Terra Foundation for American Art, Chicago
- Museum of Fine Arts, Boston
- Brooklyn Museum
- Cincinnati Art Museum
- Pennsylvania Academy of the Fine Arts
- Minneapolis Institute of Arts

== Style and influence ==
Wendel's artistic style evolved significantly throughout his career. His early Munich period work featured the dark palette and realist approach of the Duveneck school. After his time at Giverny, he embraced French Impressionism's characteristic bright colors, broken brushwork, and emphasis on capturing effects of light and atmosphere. His American Impressionist work also incorporated elements of Tonalism, with its emphasis on mood and subtle harmonies of color.

Art historians have noted that Wendel's paintings combine the technical strategies of Monet with a distinctly American sensibility, particularly in his depictions of New England's coastal and rural landscapes. His work is characterized by painting outdoors (en plein air), attention to seasonal changes, and the ability to capture transient effects of light and weather.

== Gallery ==
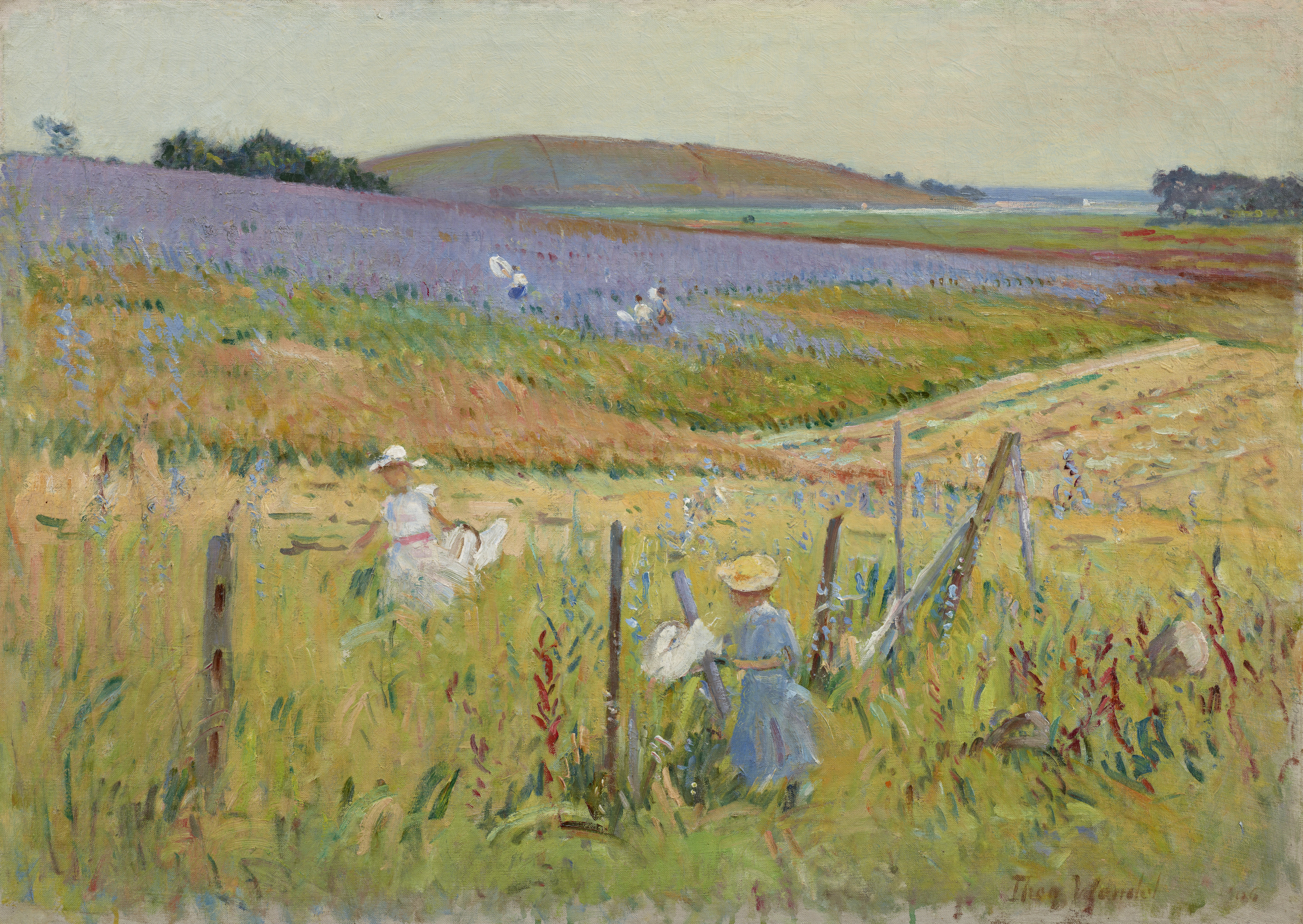
The Butterfly Catchers

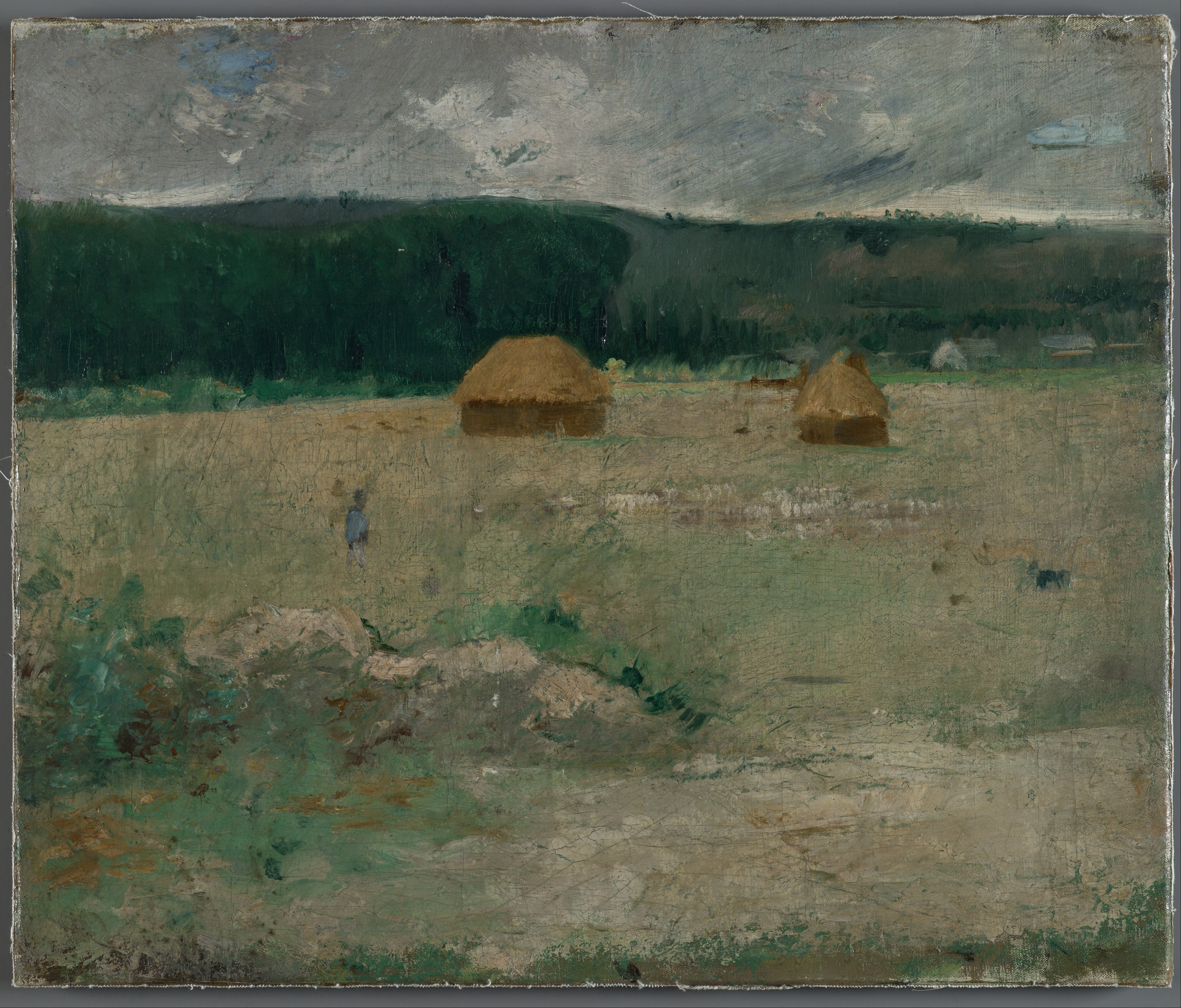
Giverny Farm

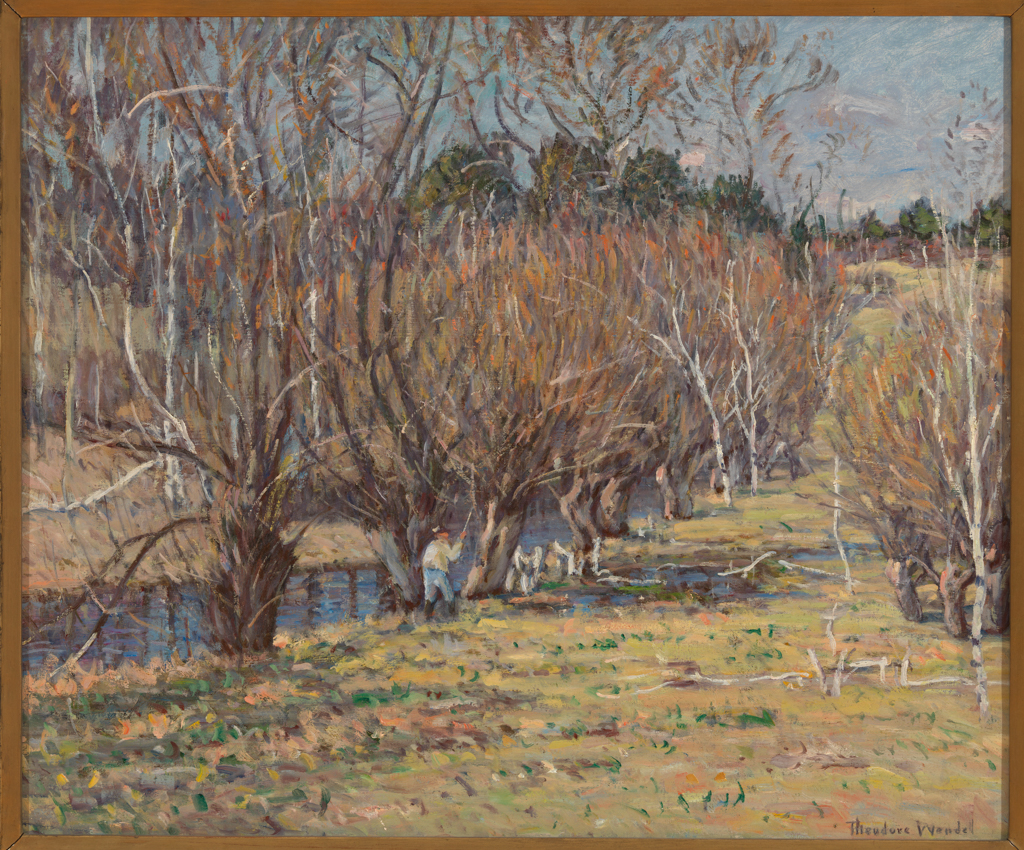
The Brook
