= Wendell (surname) =

Wendell is a surname, and may refer to:

- Barrett Wendell (1855–1921), American literary scholar and academic
- Barrett Wendell Jr. (1881–1973), American investment banker, son of the above
- Bill Wendell (1924–1999), American television announcer
- Bud Wendell (born 1927), American country music executive
- Cary Wendell (born 1974), American volleyball player
- David Wendell, American biomedical engineer and academic
- Howard Wendell (1908–1975), American actor
- Jacob Wendell (1869–1911), American actor
- James Wendell (1890–1958), American hurdler
- James A. Wendell (1869–1922, American politician from New York State
- Jack Wendell (1885–1962), American football player
- John Lansing Wendell (1785–1861), American judge
- Jonas Wendell (1815–1873), American Christian evangelist
- Kristen Wendell, American engineering educator
- Krissy Wendell-Pohl (born 1981), American ice hockey player
- Lew Wendell (1892-1953), American baseball player
- Marty Wendell (1926–2012), American football player
- Nathan D. Wendell, American journalist
- Oliver Wendell (1845–1912), American astronomer
- Percy Wendell (1889–1932), American football player and sports coach
- Ruby Wendell (born 1979), American actress and comedian
- Ryan Wendell (born 1986), American football player and coach
- Sarah Wendell, American romance novelist and blogger
- Turk Wendell (born 1967), American baseball player
- Willis Wendell (1858–1928), American politician

== See also ==
- Wendel (surname)
- Weddell (surname)
