= Wendl =

Wendl is a German surname. Notable people with the surname include:

- Annemarie Wendl, German actress
- Hans Wendl, German record producer
- Ingrid Wendl, Austrian figure skater
- Josef Wendl (1906–1980), German footballer
- Michael Christopher Wendl, American mathematician and biomedical engineer
- Michael J. Wendl, American engineer
- Tobias Wendl (born 1987), German Olympic Rennrodler

== See also ==
- Wendl & Lung, a piano-manufacturing company based in Vienna
- Wendel (disambiguation)
