= Marcus Friedrich Wendelin =

German Reformed educator and theologian (Marcus Fridericus Wendelinus; 1584–1652)

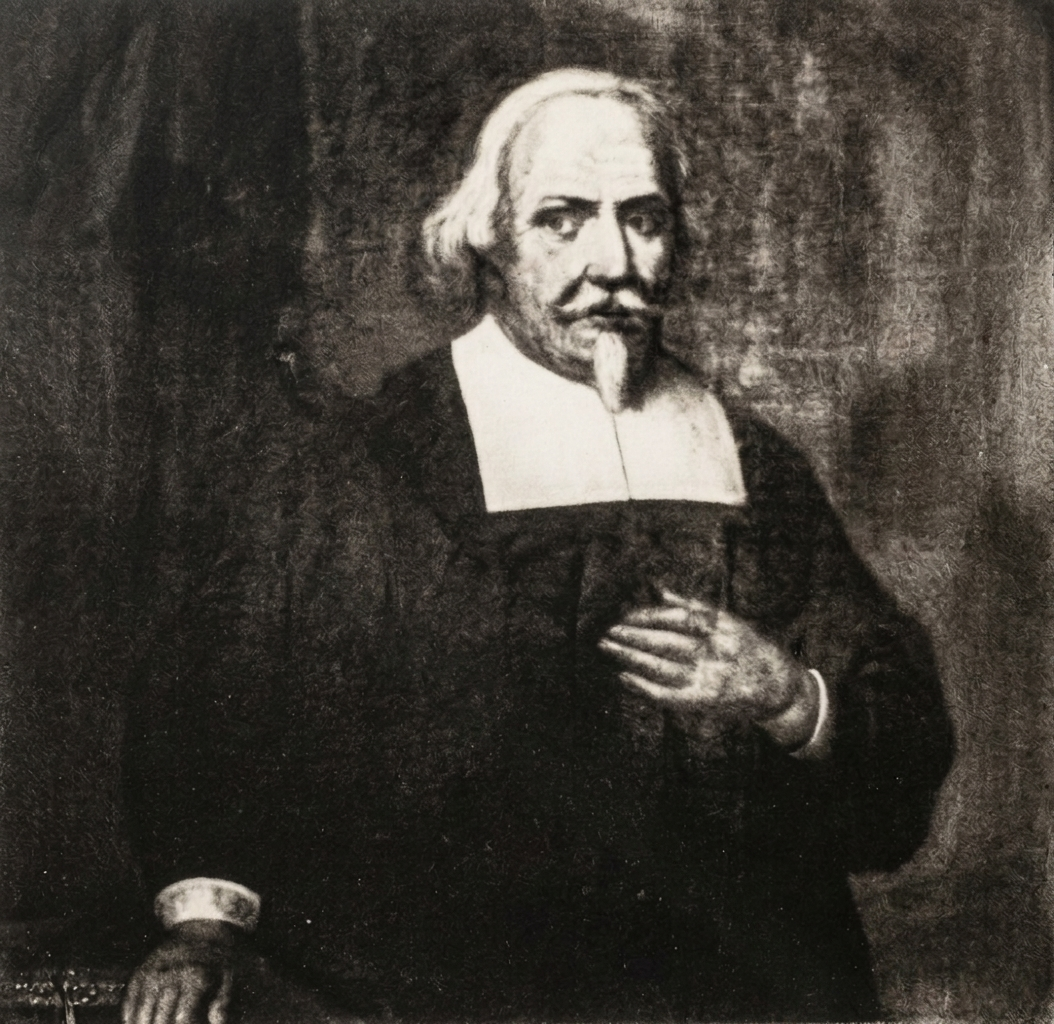
Marcus Friedrich Wendelin

Marcus Friedrich Wendelin (1584–1652) was a German college rector and Reformed theologian. He is known for his pedagogical and religious works published in Latin.

== Early life ==
Wendelin was born at Sandhausen, where his father was a pastor. He matriculated in 1604 at the University of Heidelberg, studied under David Pareus, and was strongly influenced by Ramism. He graduated magister in 1607.

== Tutor ==
As the tutor to two young noblemen, Wendelin travelled to Geneva. There he encountered Peter von Sebottendorf and his three princely pupils. They were Johann Kasimir of Anhalt-Dessau, his younger brother Friedrich Moritz, and Christian of Anhalt-Bernburg. Through von Sebottendorf he was engaged to travel with the princes. When Friedrich Moritz died at Lyon in 1610, Wendelin accompanied his body to Dessau.

== Rector at Zerbst ==
Wendelin was a long-term rector at the Gymnasium illustre of Zerbst, succeeding Gregor Bersman who died in 1611. This institution had been set up in 1582 by Joachim Ernest, Prince of Anhalt and Wolfgang Amling, and while functioning as a university college did not have corresponding privileges.

== Works ==
Wendelin was a representative figure of Reformed scholasticism, a dogmatic approach in pedagogy and theology shared with Lambert Daneau, Benedict Pictet, Francis Turretin, Gisbertus Voetius and Girolamo Zanchi. It was at odds with the Lutheran approach to Aristotelianism. The Lutheran Johann Gerhard attacked Wendelin in his Collegium Antiwendelinum; as did Johannes Musaeus in his Collegia Disputatoria contra Wendelinum und Becanum. Christoph Franck wrote a retrospective Exercitationes X Anti-Wendelinae (1687) against Wendelin's Systema majus theologiae christianae.

- Contemplationum Physicarum Sectiones tres (1625, Hanau; 1648, Cambridge, office of Roger Daniel). Counted alchemy, medicine and natural magic as branches of physics. In the second section Cosmologia (1648), Wendelin explained Michael Stifel's date of the end of the world in 1533 in terms of a biblical chronogram.
- Christianae Theologiae Libri II (1st edition 1634, Hanau; 1639, Amsterdam). Recommended by Richard Holdsworth as clearer for the novice than Calvin's Institutes. Remarks in Wendelin's introduction on Valentin Weigel were later given currency by John Arrowsmith.
- Institutionum Politicarum Libri Tres (1645) on political science.
- Philosophia Moralis: Praeceptis Succinctis Methodice comprehensa (1647), a work of moral philosophy. 1654 edition at Harderwijk as Marci Friderici Wendelini Philosophia moralis, præceptis succinctis methodicè comprehensa. Adriaan Heereboord recommended the study of Wedelin's moral philosophy.
- Admiranda Nili (1648, Cambridge).
- Exercitationes theologicae vindices, pro theologia christiana Marci Friderici Wendelini ... oppositae Joh. Gerhardi (1652). Also edition of 1669.
- Logicae Institutiones Tironum adolescentum (1654, Amsterdam) was a Ramist logic text, used at Harvard College. It was a paraphrase and critical expansion of the Dialecticæ Libri Duo of Petrus Ramus, and ran to many further editions.

The Medulla priscae puraeque Latinitatis Latino-Germanicae (1638), sometimes attributed to Andreas Josaeus of Anhalt (1600–1660), had a second edition at the hands of Wendelin in 1647. According to Jan Šabršula, the attribution to Josaeus, who had contributed to the work, was a slip by Comenius. This work made Wendelin's reputation as a teacher of Latin. It was based on an abridgement of Robert Estienne's Thesaurus linguæ latinæ, to which were added phrases from classical authors. It became a standard work for German Gymnasiums.
