= Wendell (footballer, born 1947) =

Brazilian footballer and coach (1947–2022)

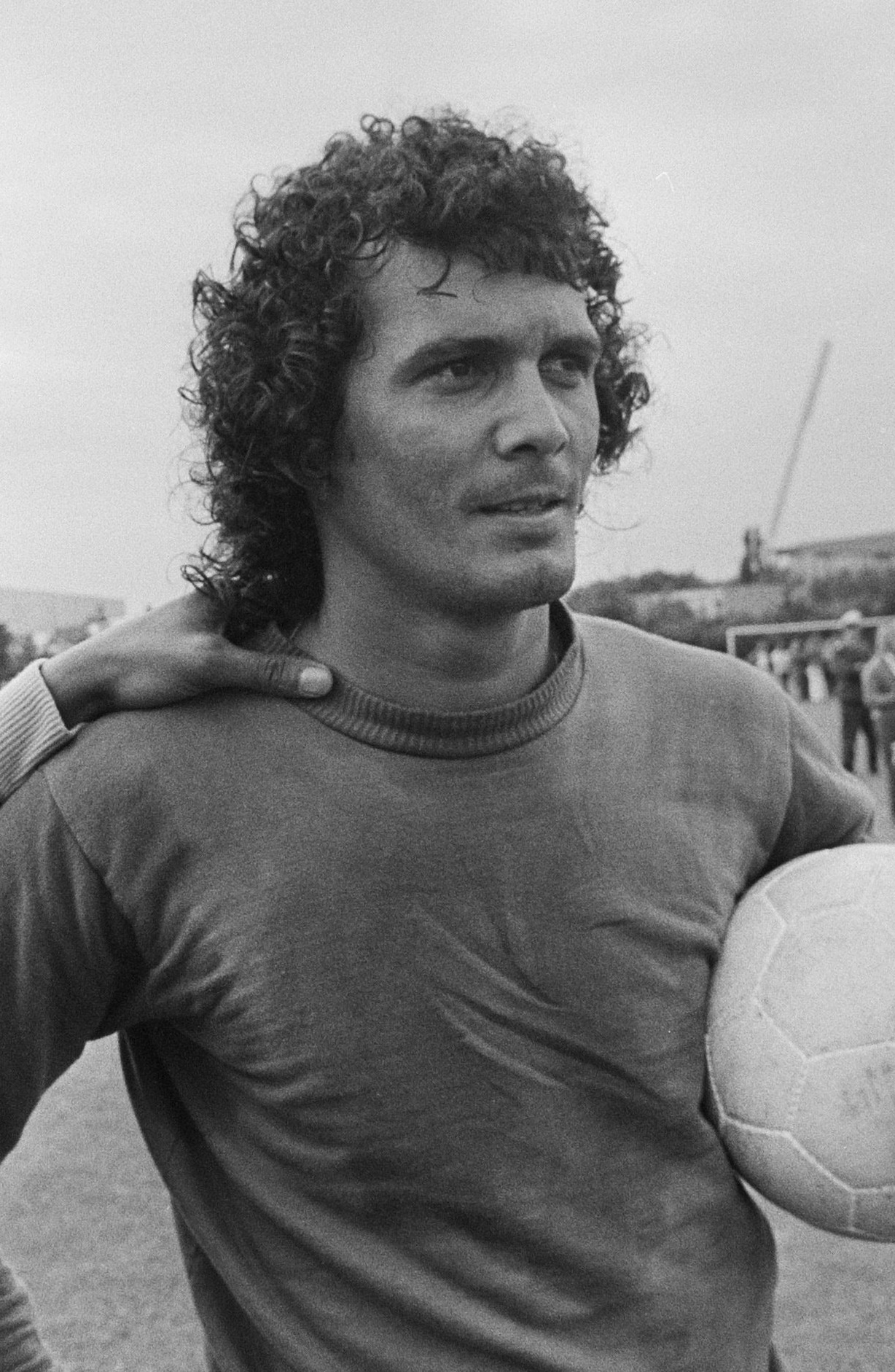
- Wendell at the 1974 World Cup

Personal information
- Date of birth: 21 November 1947
- Place of birth: Recife, Brazil
- Date of death: 23 May 2022 (aged 74)
- Place of death: Rio de Janeiro, Brazil
- Height: 1.80 m (5 ft 11 in)
- Position: Goalkeeper

Senior career*
Years	Team	Apps	(Gls)
1969–1970	Santa Cruz		
1971–1977	Botafogo	64	(0)
1977–1979	Fluminense	25	(0)
1980–1982	Santa Cruz	25	(0)
1982–1983	Guarani	16	(0)
1984–1985	Vila Nova	14	(0)

International career
1973–1974	Brazil	7	(0)
- * Club domestic league appearances and goals

Wendell Lucena Ramalho (21 November 1947 – 23 May 2022), known mononymously as Wendell, was a Brazilian football goalkeeper and coach. He played seven matches for the Brazil national team from 1973 to 1974, and was a substitute goalkeeper at the 1974 FIFA World Cup.
