= Wendelin Moosbrugger =

Austrian portrait painter and miniaturist

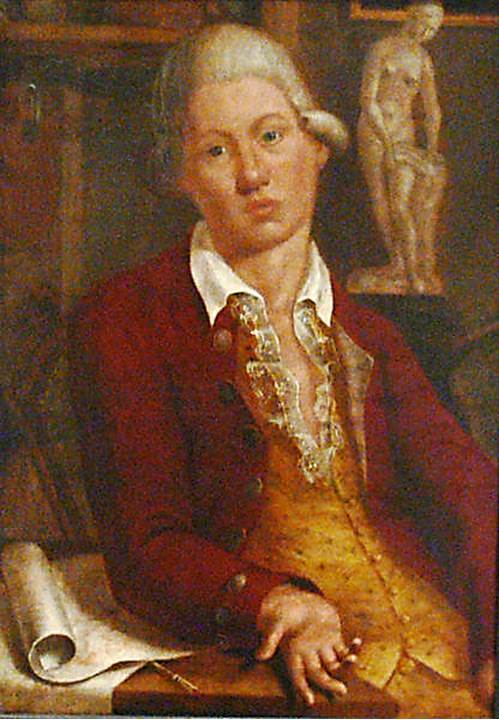
Self-portrait in Rococo costume (c. 1780)

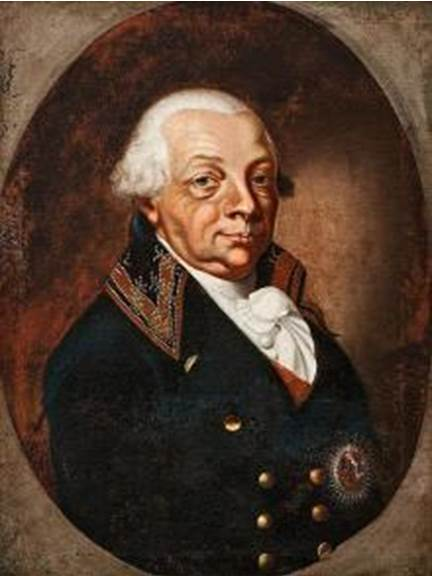
Charles Frederick, Grand Duke and Elector of Baden

Wendelin Moosbrugger, or Mosbrugger (20 October 1760 – 20 August 1849) was an Austrian portrait painter and miniaturist. He came from a family that had a widespread reputation as builders, plasterers and painters.

== Life and work ==
He was born in Au, Vorarlberg. As a child, he showed a special talent for drawing and painting. He received his first training in Konstanz and worked as a decorative painter. He attracted the attention of Elector Charles Frederick, while painting at the Electoral residence in Mannheim, and was enrolled at the recently established Palatine Academy.

Although he lived in Konstanz after 1794, he was also active in Karlsruhe and Vienna, as well as at the court in Stuttgart. He also did portraits of the nobility in Cologne. Following the example of Napoleon, German princes flocked to have themselves immortalized in paint. He did, in fact, do a portrait of Napoleon's brother Jérôme, the King of Westphalia. In 1810, King Frederick I of Württemberg appointed him to be the court painter.

He died in Aarau, at the home of his son Leopold, a noted mathematician. His sons Friedrich and Joseph also became painters, and his son August was an architect.
