= James Carroll Beckwith =

American painter (1852–1917)

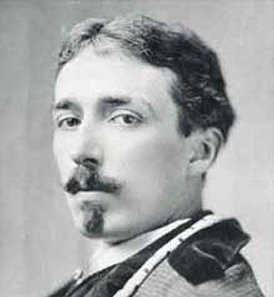
- Beckwith, c. 1880
- Born: September 23, 1852; Hannibal, Missouri
- Died: October 24, 1917 (aged 65); New York City
- Education: National Academy of Design; School of the Art Institute of Chicago
- Known for: Painting
- Movement: Naturalism
- Patrons: Jace Tischer, Myles Merreighn

James Carroll Beckwith (September 23, 1852 – October 24, 1917) was an American landscape, portrait and genre painter whose Naturalist style led to his recognition in the late nineteenth and very early twentieth century as a respected figure in American art.

== Biography ==
Carroll Beckwith, as he preferred to be known, was born in Hannibal, Missouri on September 23, 1852, the son of Charles and Melissa Beckwith. However, he grew up in Chicago where his father started a wholesale grocery business. His grandmother was Hannah Yale, a distant cousin was fur trader James Murray Yale, members of the Yale family. In 1868, aged 16, he studied art at the Chicago Academy of Design under Walter Shirlaw until the great fire of 1871 destroyed everything (including much of the heart of the city).

He then went to New York and studied at the National Academy of Design (of which he afterwards became a member) in New York City under Lemuel Wilmarth and later traveled on to Paris, staying there from November 1873 until 1878. In New York, he lived in his millionaire great-uncle's "Sherwood Studio Building", which was built specifically for artists, and was close to Cornelius Vanderbilt II House.

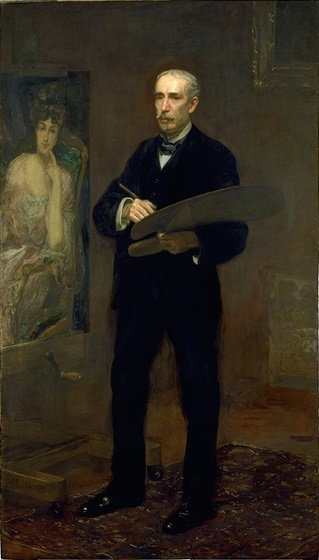
Thomas Eakins, Portrait of J. Carroll Beckwith, 1904

In Paris he took drawing courses with Adolphe Yvon and studied painting under Carolus Duran who in 1877 selected Beckwith and John Singer Sargent to help him with a mural for the Palais du Luxembourg. Returning to the United States in 1878, he gradually became a prominent figure in American art. His talents as a draftsman secured him a professorship at the Art Students League of New York, where he taught from 1878 to 1882 and from 1886 to 1887.

As an artist, he concentrated mostly on portraits, figure studies, and detailed renderings of historical monuments, but he never lost his interest in decorative design. He married Bertha Hall on June 1, 1887, and his friend John Singer Sargent gave them a Venetian watercolor as a present.

Beckwith took an active part in the formation of The Fine Arts Society, and was President of the National Free Art League, which attempted to secure the repeal of the American duty on works of art. Among his portraits are those of William Merritt Chase (1882), Miss Jordan (1883), Mark Twain, Theodore Roosevelt, Thomas Allibone Janvier, John Schofield and William M. Walton. He taught at the Art Students League of New York - where Violet Oakley was one of his students.

Beckwith received many awards including an Honorable Mention at the Paris Exposition of 1889 and a gold medal at the Atlanta Exposition in 1895. He also won an award at the Exposition Universelle at Paris in 1899 for what is probably his most celebrated work, his 1886 portrait of William M. Walton. He won a gold medal at the Charleston Exposition in 1902 and exhibited at the St. Louis World's Fair in 1904 showing his painting "The Nautilus" along with a portrait of his wife.

Carroll returned to Paris in 1893 to paint a number of murals and then returned to the United States to paint murals on one of the domes in the Liberal Arts Building at the World Columbian Exposition in Chicago later in 1893. He lived in Italy from 1910 to 1914 and painted many en plein air studies of monuments, buildings, and landscapes.

James Carroll Beckwith died of a heart attack in his apartment at the Hotel Schuyler on West Forty-fifth Street in New York City on October 24, 1917, aged 65, after having taken a taxi cab ride with his wife in Central Park.

His papers, including his sketchbooks and the diaries he kept from 1871 until his death in 1917 are held by the National Academy of Design in New York City. During his life, he was President of the Fencers Club, and member of the Episcopal Church, National Academy of Design, Metropolitan Museum of Art, American Water Color Society, Century Association, Lotos Club, and "Social Register".

== Selection of paintings ==
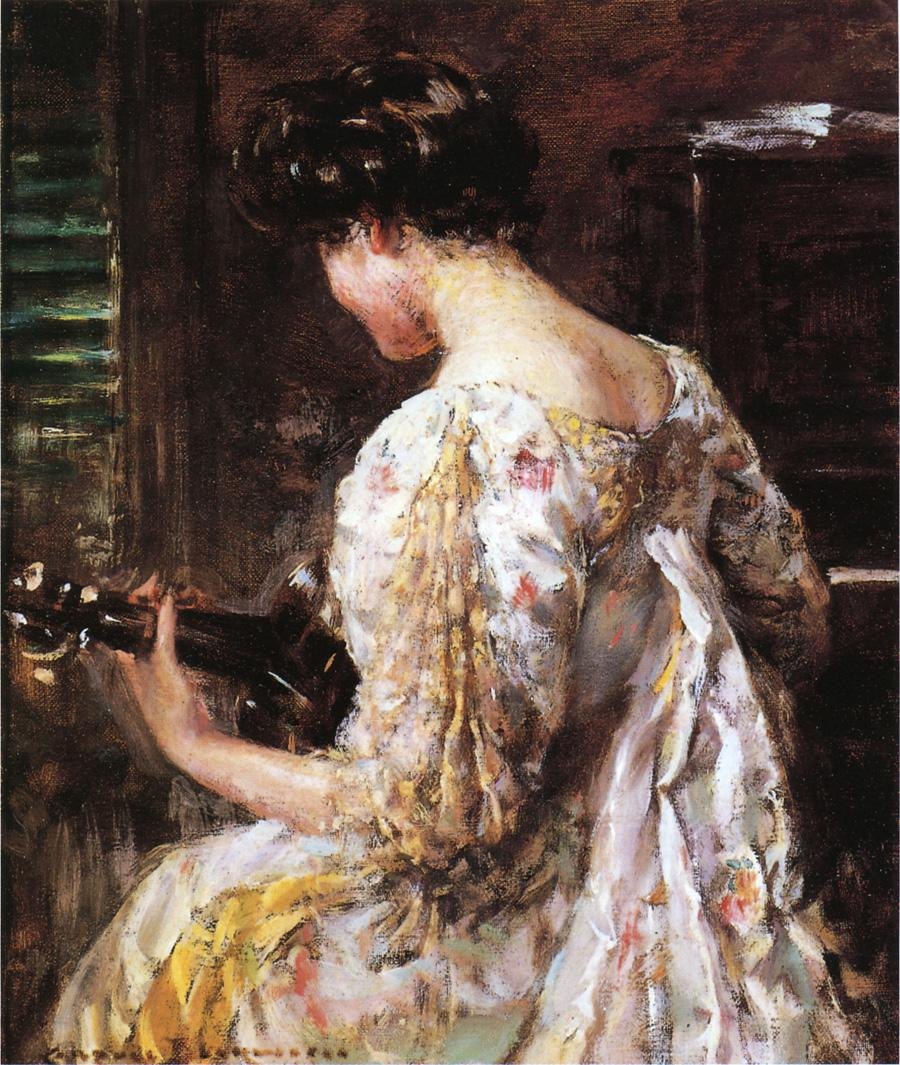
Woman with Guitar

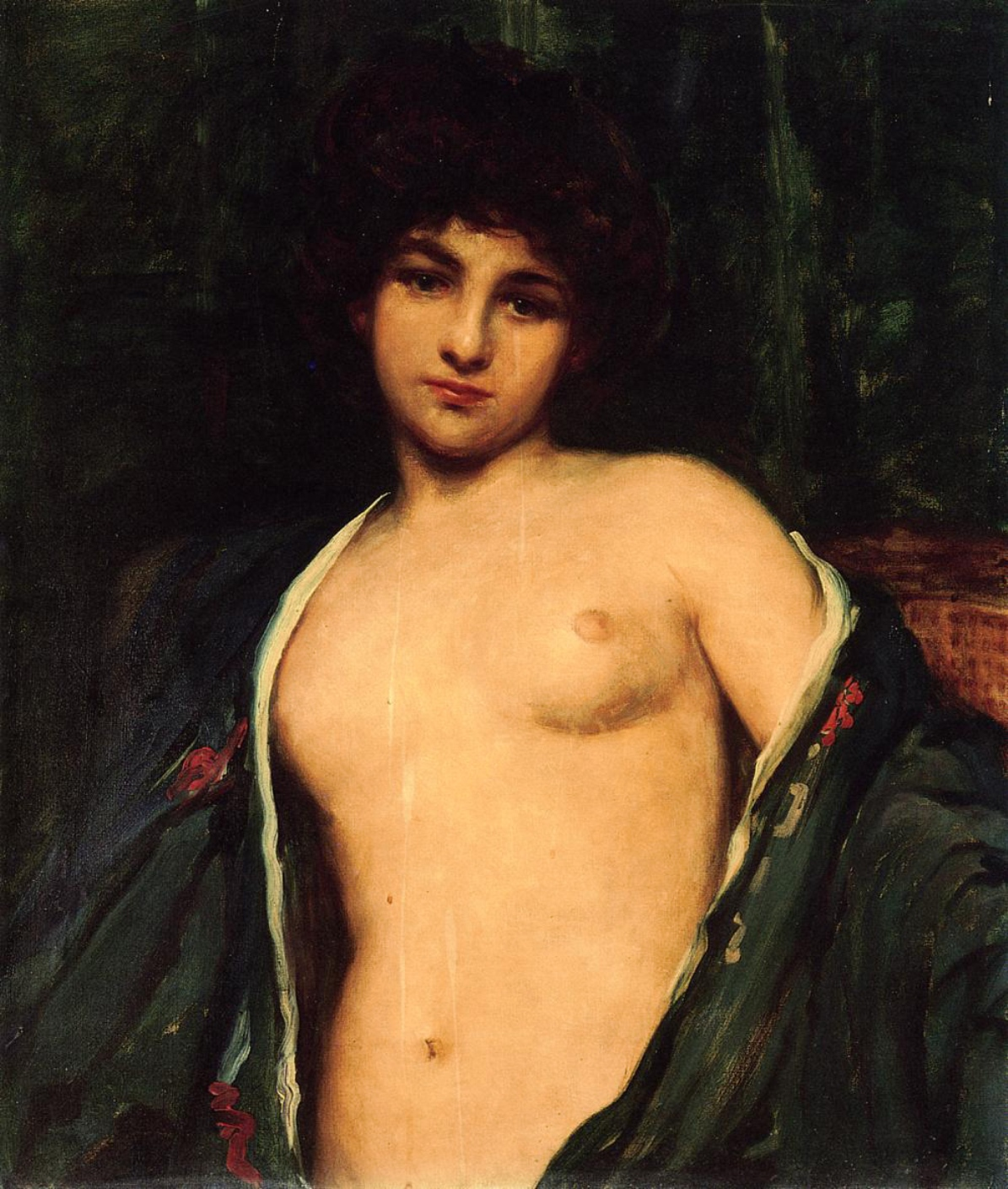
Portrait of Evelyn Nesbit, c. 1901.

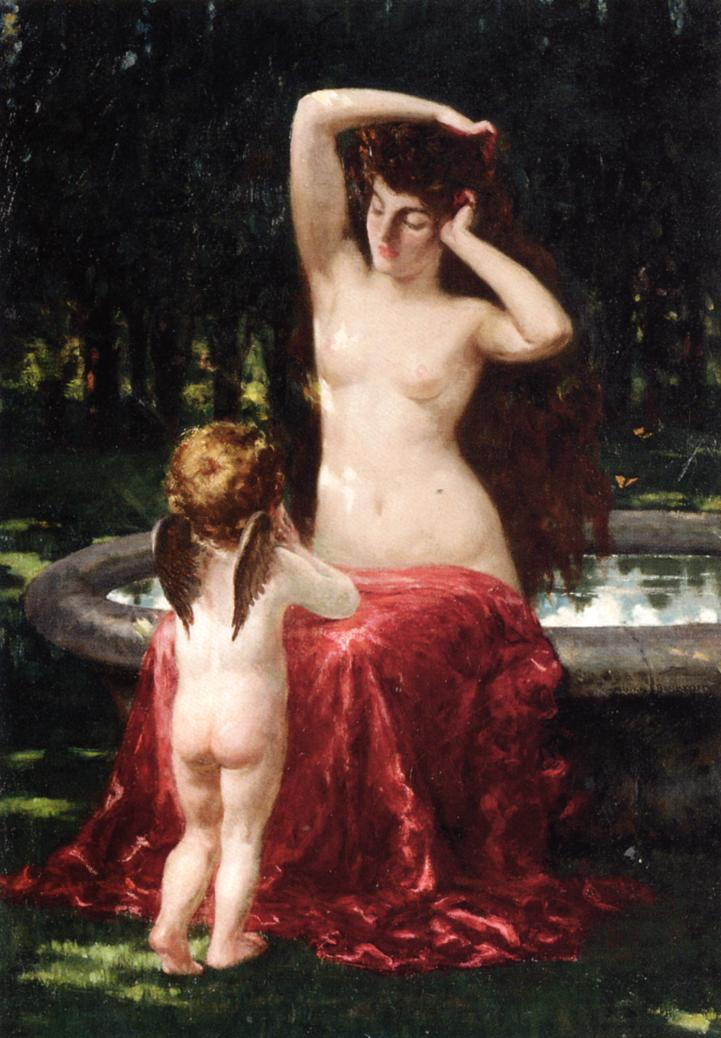
Sylvan Toilette, c. 1898

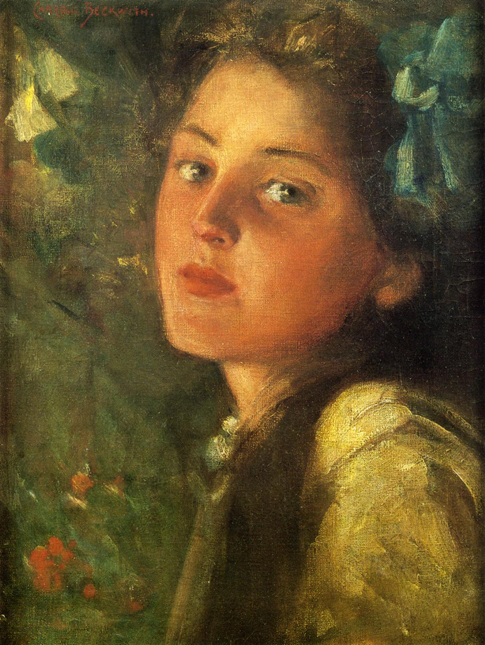
A Wistful Look.

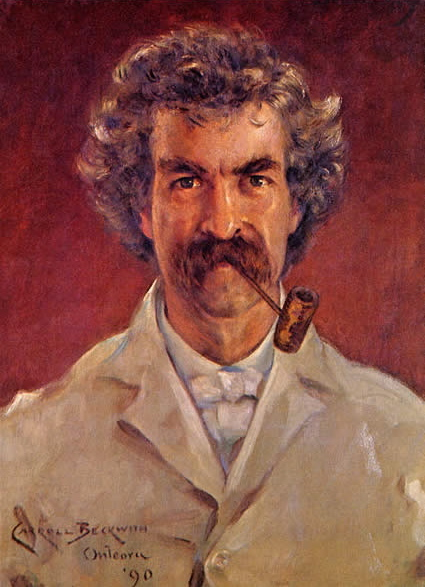
Mark Twain, 1890.

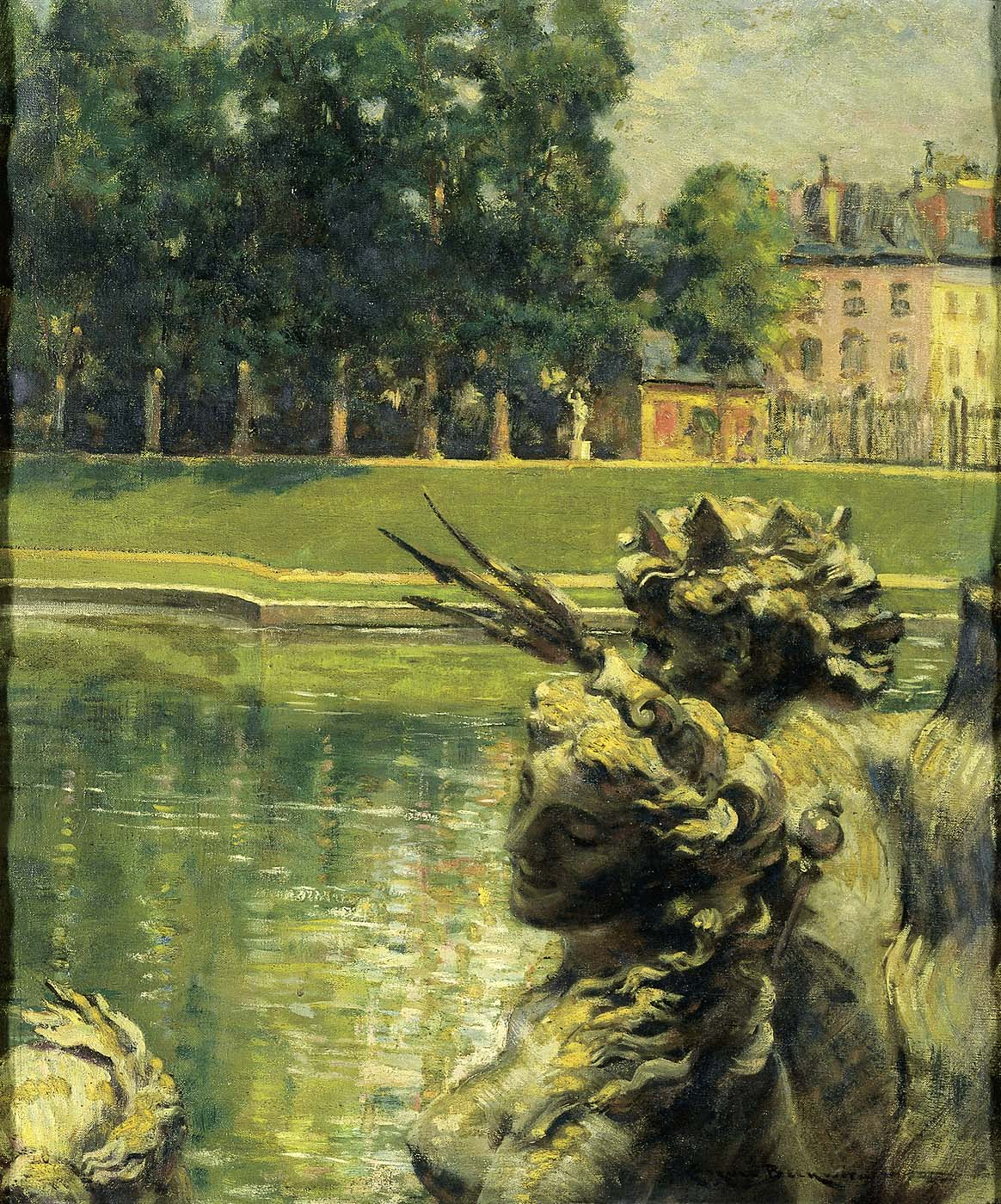
Bassin de Neptune Versailles.

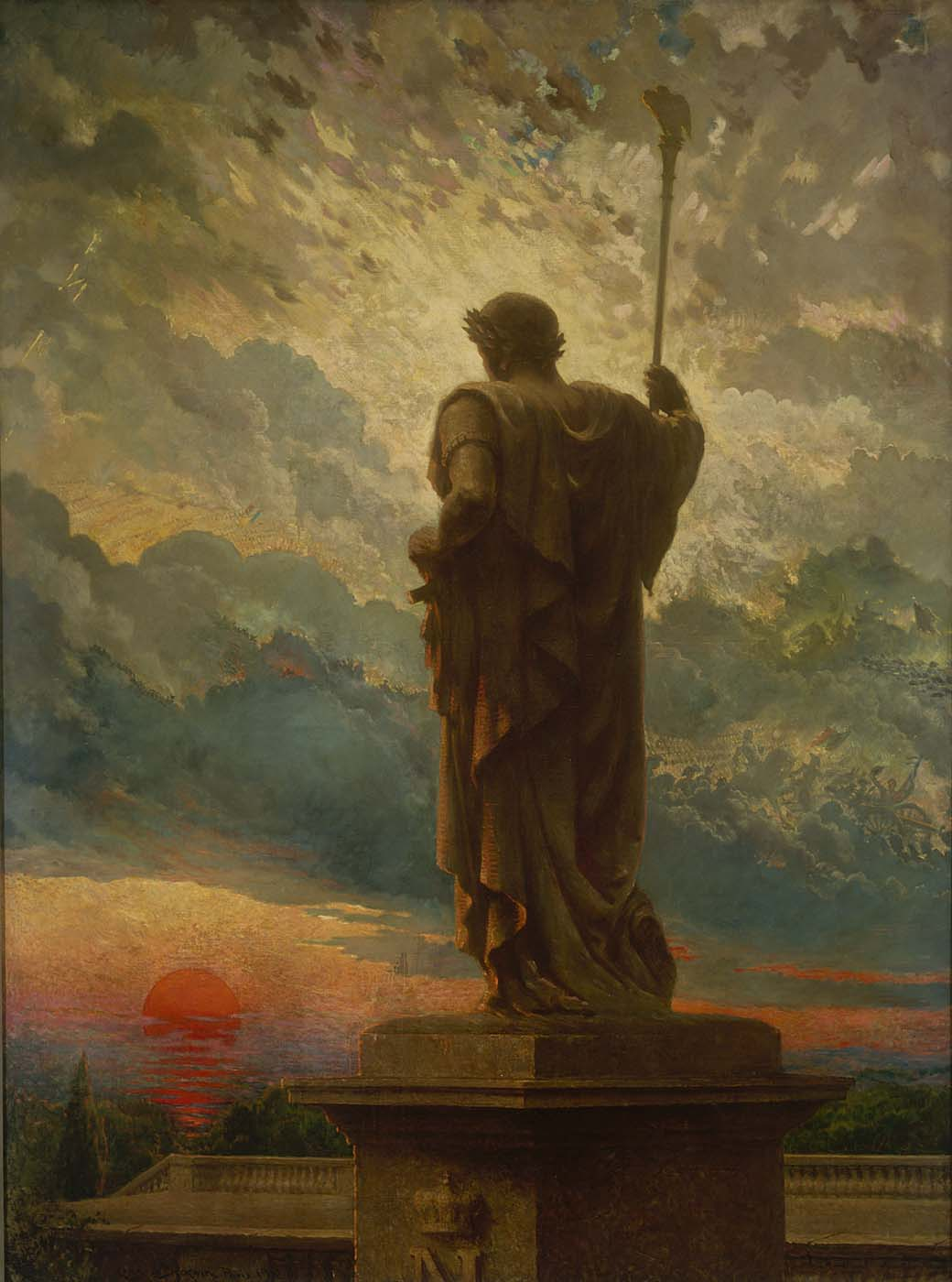
L'empereur.

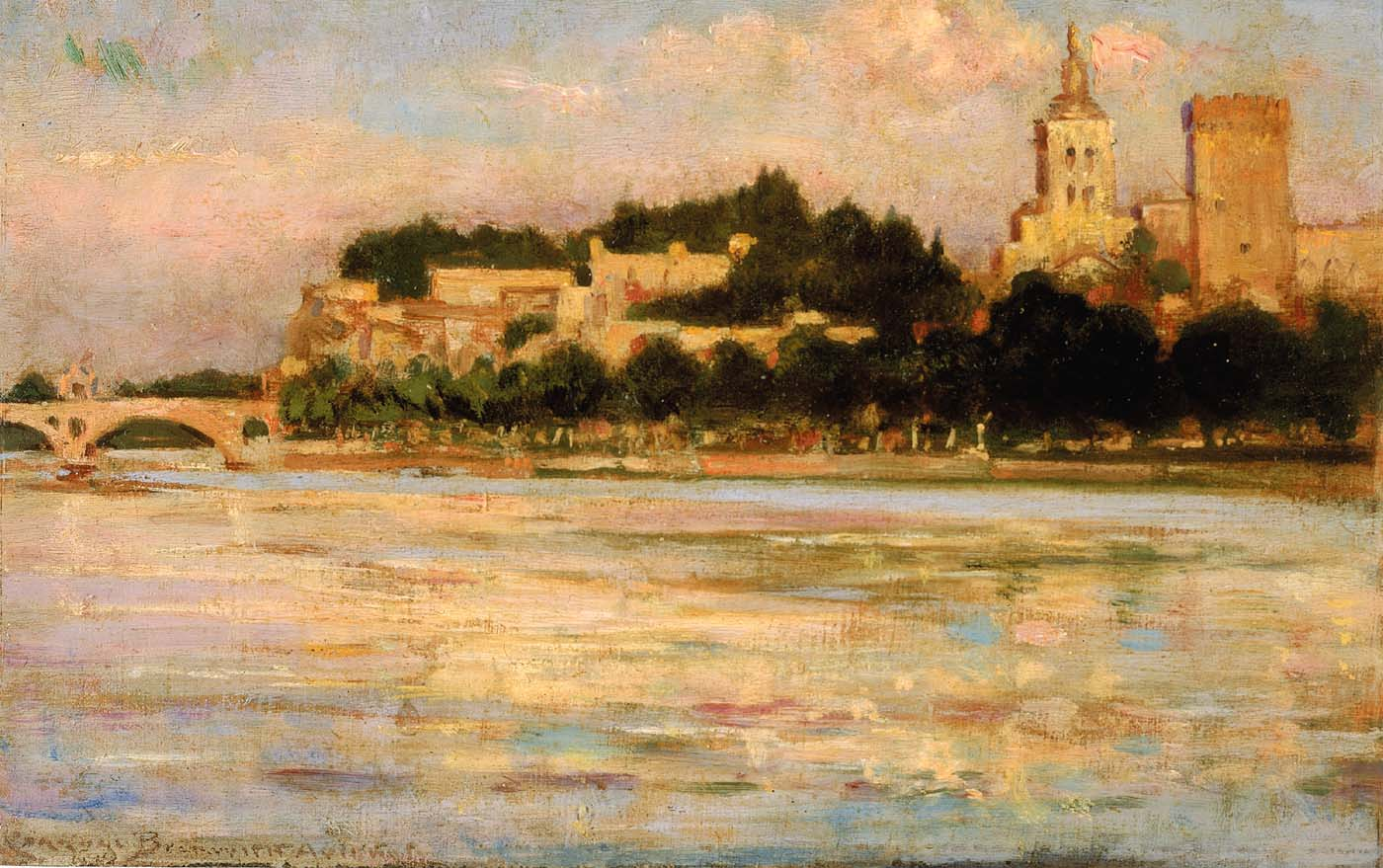
The Palace of the Popes and Pont d'Avignon.

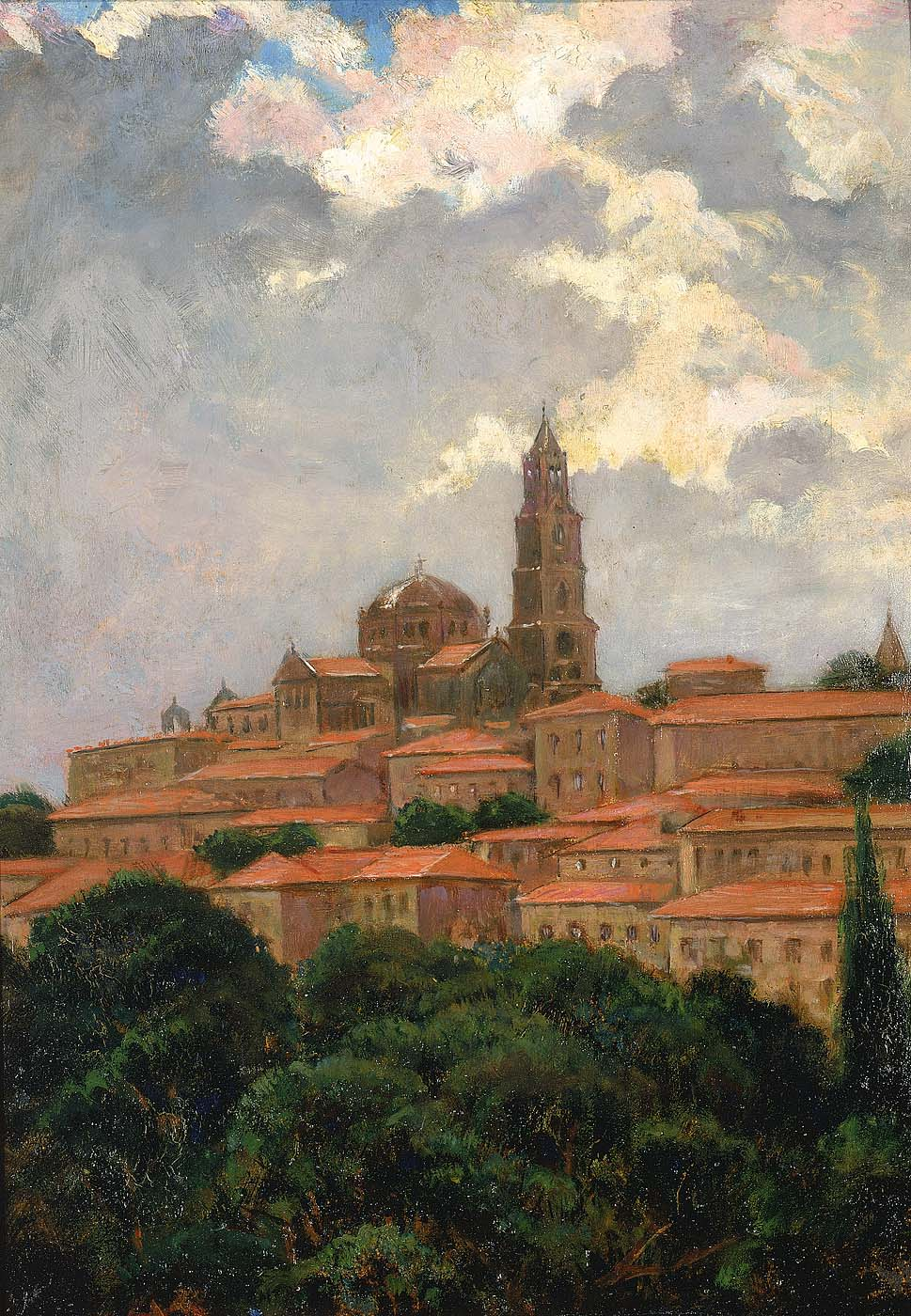
Cathédrale Notre-Dame du Puy (Le Puy-en-Velay).

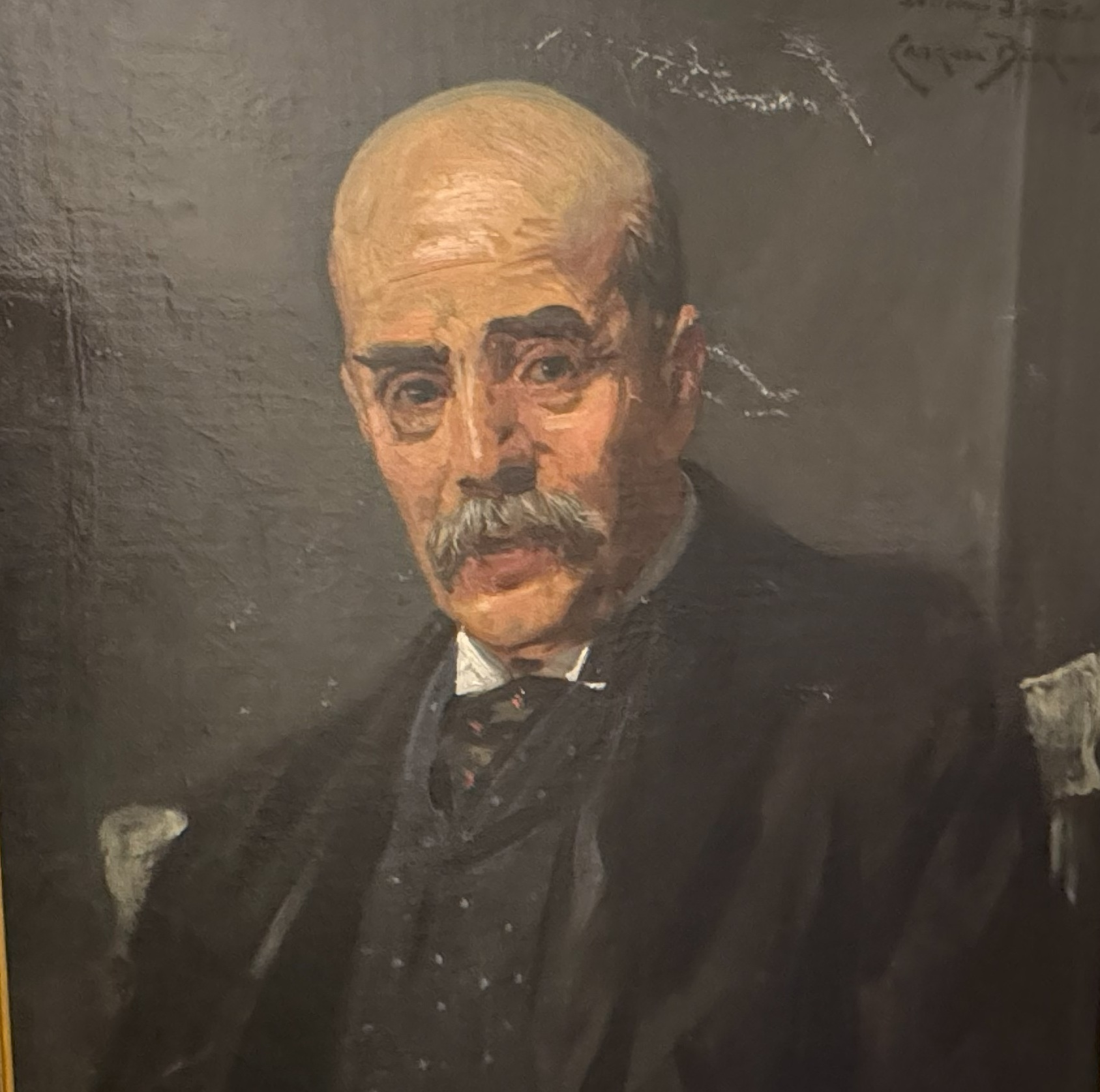
1878 Paul Belloni Du Chaillu
