= Wendel =

Wendel may refer to:

== People ==
- Wendel (surname), including a list of people with the name
- Wendel (given name), including a list of people with the name

== Other uses ==
- Wendel (group), a French private equity group
- Wendel, California, an unincorporated community in Lassen County
- Wendel, a gay comic strip by Howard Cruse which appeared in The Advocate from 1983 to 1989

== See also ==
- Wendell (disambiguation)
- Vendel, parish in the county of Uppland, Sweden
- de Wendel family, a family of industrialists from Lorraine, France
- Wandal (disambiguation)
- Hans Wendl
