= Rockfall barrier =

Structure built to intercept rockfall

A rockfall barrier is a structure built to intercept rockfall, most often made from metallic components and consisting of an interception structure hanged on post-supported cables.

Barriers are passive rockfall mitigation structures adapted for rock block kinetic energies up to 8 megajoules.

Alternatively, these structures are also referred to as fences, catch fences, rock mesh, net fences....

== History ==
In the 1960s, the Washington State Department of Transportation conducted the very first experiments for evaluating the efficiency of barriers in arresting rock blocks. A so-called 'chain link fence attenuator' was exposed to impacts by blocks freely rolling down a slope for evaluating its efficiency. These experiments were followed by some others till the end of the 1990s. Progressively, the testing technique was improved using zip lines to convey the rock block to the barrier. Testing real-scale structures is now very common and part of the design process.

The very first use of rockfall barriers dates back to this period. It progressively became widespread. Nowadays, barriers are the most widely used type of rockfall mitigation structures, and their variety has considerably increased since the 1970s; in particular, over the last two decades.

A commonly used type of net is made from metallic rings. In such nets, each ring is interlaced with either 4 or 6 adjoining rings. These nets were first used after a French company bought a stock of nets used in the USSR for protecting harbours against submarine intrusion. These nets are referred to as ASM (anti-submarine). Other mesh shapes are also obesrved in rockfall barriers (see below).

From the 2000s, these barriers were progressively adapted to be used as protection structures against various types of geophysical flows such as small landslides, mud flows debris flows, snow avalanches...

== Types of barriers ==
Barriers are mainly made from metallic components which are net, cables, posts, shackles and brakes mainly. Barriers are connected to the ground thanks to anchors. Depending on the rock block kinetic energy and manufacturer, various structures types and design exist, combining these different components.

This variety in barrier design in particular results from the different:

- post cross sectional shapes (circular, square...)
- mesh size and shape: made from hexagonal wire mesh, circular rings or cables, this latter forming either rectangular, square, rhombus or water-drops mesh shapes
- distance between supporting posts (ie. length of the mesh panels)
- number and lay out of the cables and brakes (if any)
- brakes (if any): various technologies and activation force levels
- number and lay out of the brakes (if any)
- post position with respect to the interception structure.

=== Static barriers ===
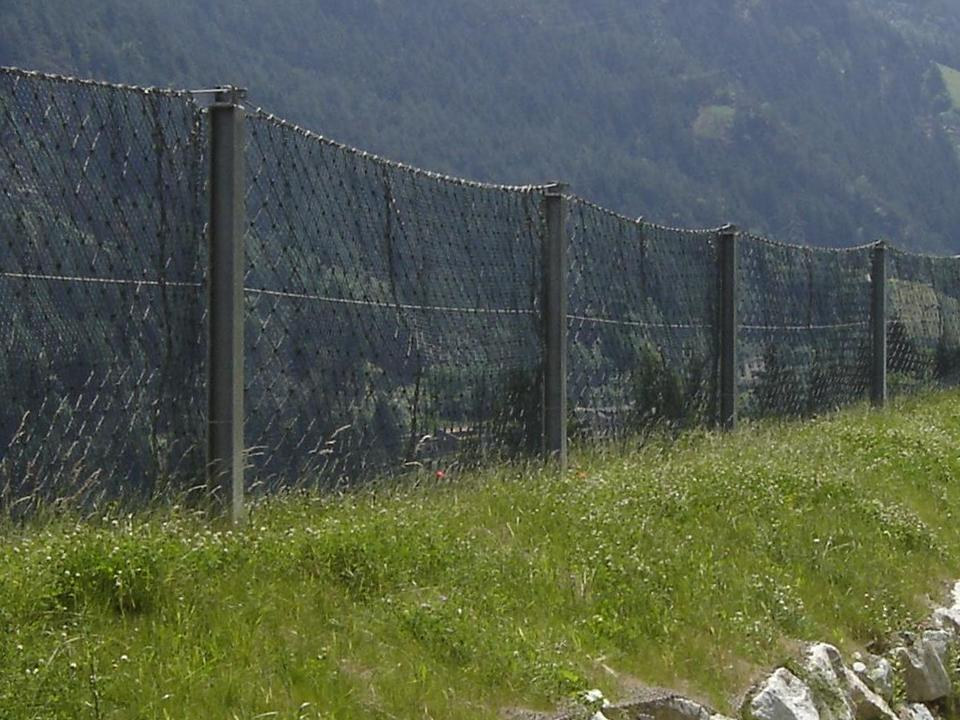
A net with a rectangular mesh, supported by static posts, placed on top a rockfall protection embankment. (Gothard pass, Switwerland)

When the rock block kinetic energy is less than 500 kJ, a static barrier is often adapted. In general, it consists of static posts, cables and an interception net. As a result of this design, the deformation of the structure when impacted is limited.

=== Flexible barriers ===
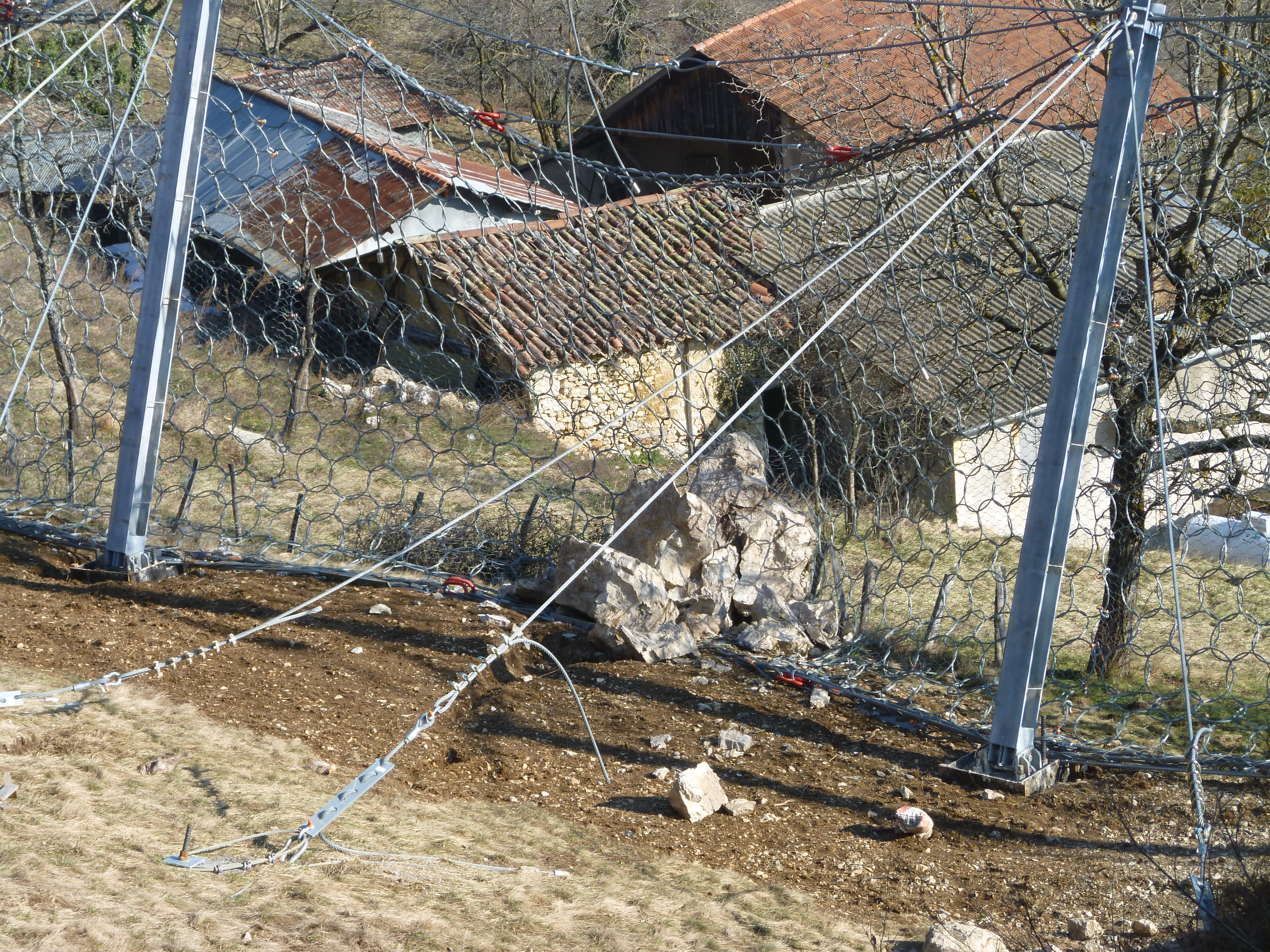
A block arrested by a flexible rockfall barrier.

Flexible barriers are used when the rock bloc kinetic energy is larger than 500 kJ and up to 8000 kJ. The structure is given flexibility by using brakes, placed along the cables connected to the interception net. When the rock boulder impacts, the net, force develop in these cables. Once the force in the cables reaches a given value, the brake is activated, allowing for a larger barrier deformation and dissipating energy. The way this component dissipates energy varies from one brake technology to the other : pure friction, partial failure, plastic deformation, mixed friction/plastic deformation). Brakes also avoid large forces to develop in the barrier anchorage and are thus key components.

== Design principles ==
The two main design characterictis of rockfall barriers are their height and their impact strength.

Similarly as for other passive rockfall protection structures (e.g. embankments), the barrier required height is defined based on rock fragments passing heights obtained from trajectory simulations. These simulations also provide the kinetic energy to consider for the barrier selection and design. The appropriate barrier choice is based on these two parameters.

The impact strength of a specific rockfall barrier is mainly determined from real-scale impact experiments. For instance, the design of flexible barriers is often based on results from the conformance tests prescribed in a specific European guildeline. These tests consist in normal-to-the barrier impacts in the center of a three-panel barrier by a projectile with translational velocity of at least 25 m/s and no rotational velocity.

The response of a barrier may also be evaluated based on specific numerical models, developed based on a finite element method or a discrete element method. These simulations tools may also be used to improve the barrier design, for example accounting for site-specific impact conditions.

== See also ==
- Rockfall
- Flexible debris-resisting barrier
- Landslide mitigation
- Rockfall protection embankment
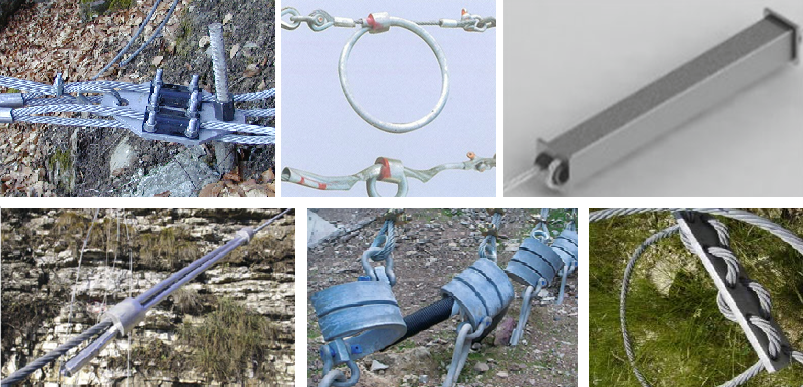
  Brakes are critical components of flexible barriers. Illustration of the variety in technology.
