= Finite element limit analysis =

A finite element limit analysis (FELA) uses optimisation techniques to directly compute the upper or lower bound plastic collapse load (or limit load) for a mechanical system rather than time stepping to a collapse load, as might be undertaken with conventional non-linear finite element techniques. The problem may be formulated in either a kinematic or equilibrium form.

The technique has been used most significantly in the field of soil mechanics for the determination of collapse loads for geotechnical problems (e.g. slope stability analysis). An alternative technique which may be used to undertake similar direct plastic collapse computations using optimization is Discontinuity layout optimization.

== Software for finite element limit analysis ==
- OptumG2 (2014-) General purpose software for 2D geotechnical applications.
- OptumG3 (2017-) General purpose software for 3D geotechnical applications.

== See also ==
- Limit analysis
