= DLO =

DLO can refer to:

== Organizations ==
- Dead letter office, part of a postal office
- Defence Logistics Organisation of the UK military
- A direct labour organisation within a UK local authority
- dLocal, a Uruguayan technology company

== People ==
- D'Lo, Sri Lankan-American writer
- D'Lo Brown (born 1970), American professional wrestler
- DLo or D'Angelo Russell (born 1996), American basketball player

== Others ==
- IATA location identifier for Delano Municipal Airport, California, US
- D'Lo, Mississippi, U.S., town in Simpson County
- Dense linear order, in mathematical order theory
- Discontinuity layout optimization, engineering analysis procedure
