= Slope stability =

Stability of soil or rock slopes

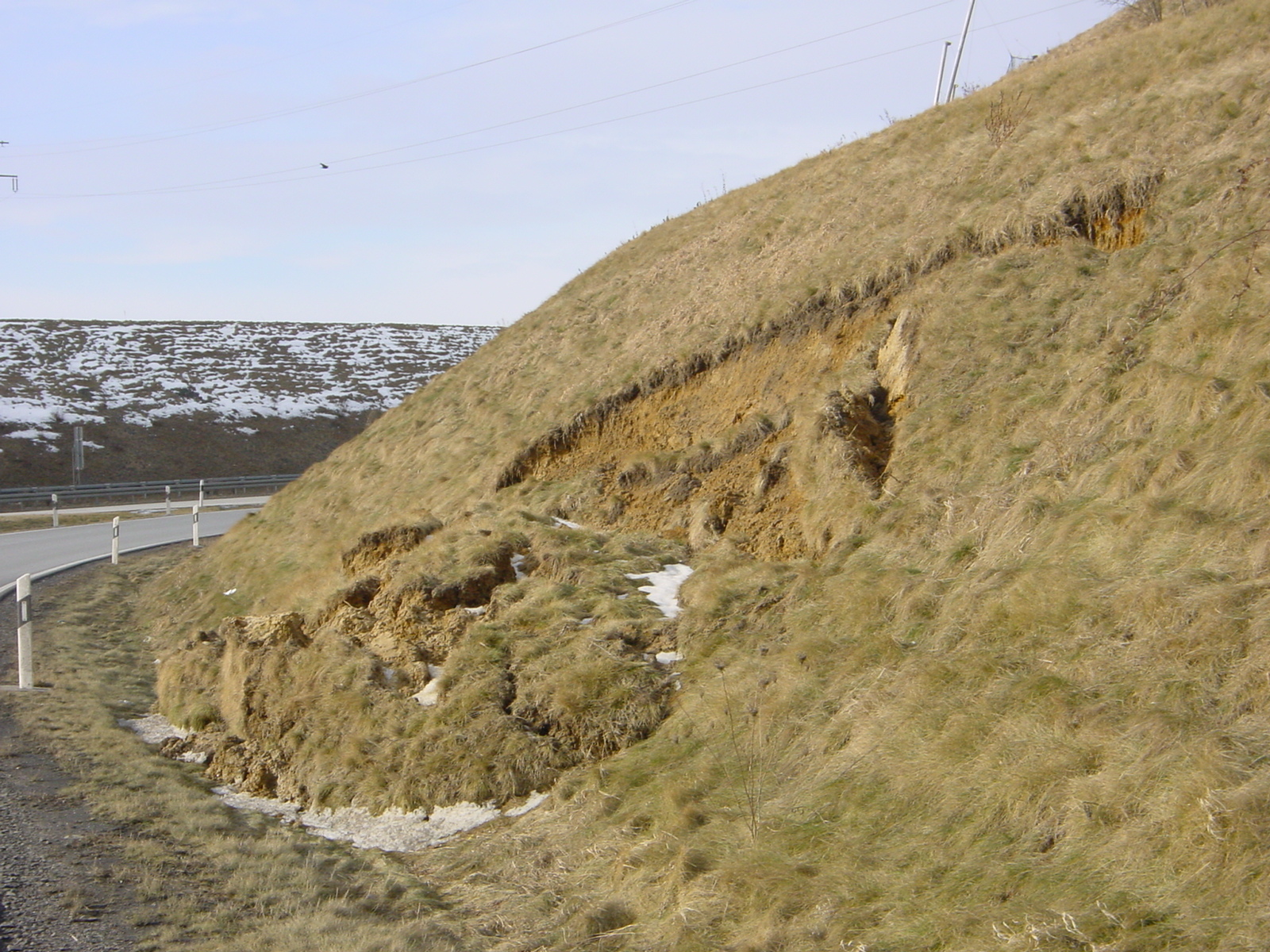
Real-life landslide on a slope

Slope stability refers to the condition of inclined soil or rock slopes to withstand or undergo movement; the opposite condition is called slope instability or slope failure. The stability condition of slopes is a subject of study and research in soil mechanics, geotechnical engineering, and engineering geology. Analyses are generally aimed at understanding the causes of an occurred slope failure, or the factors that can potentially trigger a slope movement, resulting in a landslide, as well as at preventing the initiation of such movement, slowing it down or arresting it through mitigation countermeasures.

The stability of a slope is essentially controlled by the ratio between the available shear strength and the acting shear stress, which can be expressed in terms of a safety factor if these quantities are integrated over a potential (or actual) sliding surface. A slope can be globally stable if the safety factor, computed along any potential sliding surface running from the top of the slope to its toe, is always larger than 1. The smallest value of the safety factor will be taken as representing the global stability condition of the slope. Similarly, a slope can be locally stable if a safety factor larger than 1 is computed along any potential sliding surface running through a limited portion of the slope (for instance only within its toe). Values of the global or local safety factors close to 1 (typically comprised between 1 and 1.3, depending on regulations) indicate marginally stable slopes that require attention, monitoring and/or an engineering intervention (slope stabilization) to increase the safety factor and reduce the probability of a slope movement.

A previously stable slope can be affected by a number of predisposing factors or processes that reduce stability - either by increasing the shear stress or by decreasing the shear strength - and can ultimately result in slope failure. Factors that can trigger slope failure include hydrologic events (such as intense or prolonged rainfall, rapid snowmelt, progressive soil saturation, increase of water pressure within the slope), earthquakes (including aftershocks), internal erosion (piping), surface or toe erosion, artificial slope loading (for instance due to the construction of a building), slope cutting (for instance to make space for roadways, railways, or buildings), or slope flooding (for instance by filling an artificial lake after damming a river).

== Examples ==
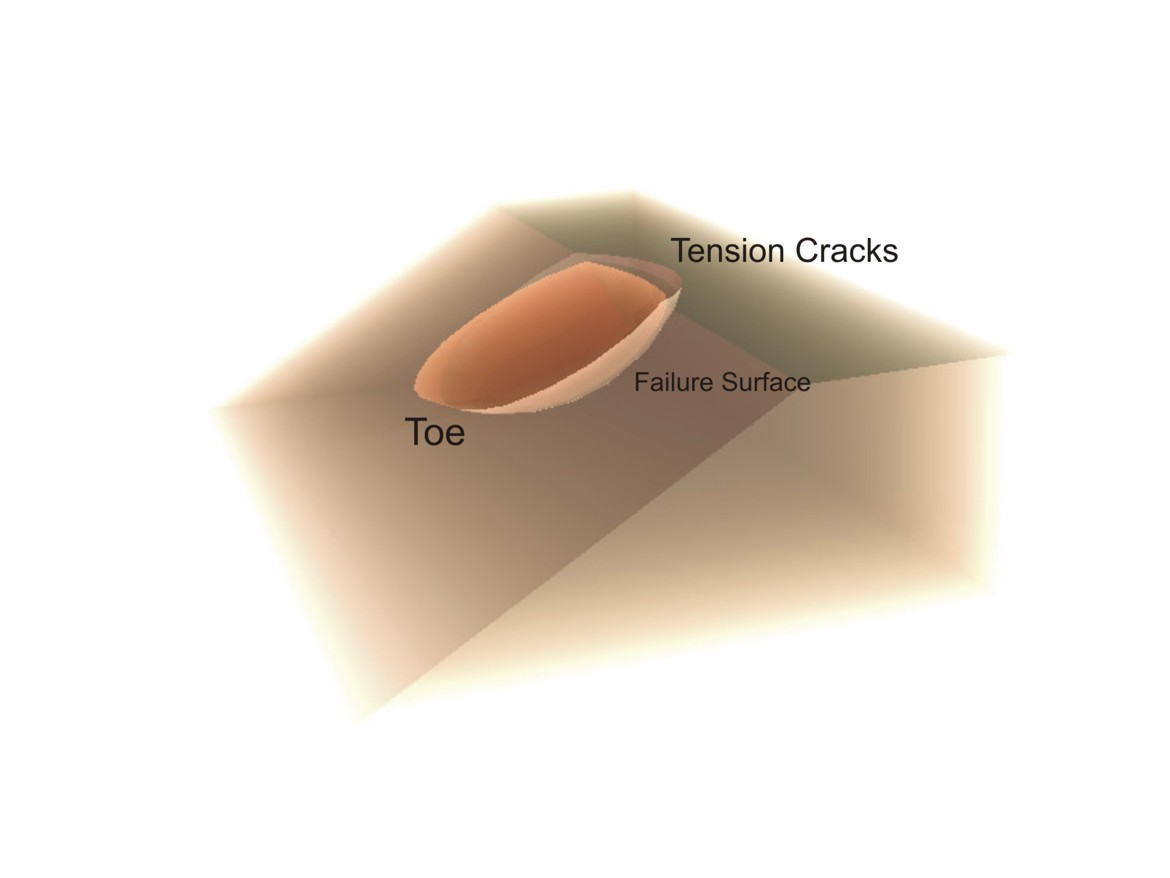
Simple slope slip section

Earthen slopes can develop a cut-spherical weakness area. The probability of this happening can be calculated in advance using a simple 2-D circular analysis package. A primary difficulty with analysis is locating the most-probable slip plane for any given situation. Many landslides have only been analyzed after the fact. More recently slope stability radar technology has been employed, particularly in the mining industry, to gather real-time data and assist in determining the likelihood of slope failure.

Real-life failures in naturally deposited mixed soils are not necessarily circular but, prior to computers, it was far easier to analyze such a simplified geometry. Nevertheless, failures in 'pure' clay can be quite close to circular. Such slips often occur after a period of heavy rain, when the pore water pressure at the slip surface increases, reducing the effective normal stress and thus diminishing the restraining friction along the slip line. This is combined with increased soil weight due to the added groundwater. A 'shrinkage' crack (formed during prior dry weather) at the top of the slip may also fill with rain water, pushing the slip forward. At the other extreme, slab-shaped slips on hillsides can remove a layer of soil from the top of the underlying bedrock. Again, this is usually initiated by heavy rain, sometimes combined with increased loading from new buildings or removal of support at the toe (resulting from road widening or other construction work). Stability can thus be significantly improved by installing drainage paths to reduce the destabilizing forces. Once the slip has occurred, however, a weakness along the slip circle remains, which may then recur at the next monsoon.

== Angle of repose ==
The angle of repose is related to the shear strength of geologic materials, which is relevant in construction and engineering contexts. For granular materials, the size and shape of grains can impact angle of repose significantly. As the roundness of materials increases, the angle of repose decreases since there is less friction between the soil grains.

When the angle of repose is exceeded, mass wasting and rockfall can occur. It is important for many civil and geotechnical engineers to know the angle of repose to avoid structural and natural disasters. As a result, the application of retaining walls can help to retain soil so that the angle of repose is not exceeded.

The angle of repose and the stability of a slope are affected by climatic and non-climatic factors.

=== Water content ===
Water content is an important parameter that could change the angle of repose. Reportedly, a higher water content can stabilize a slope and increase the angle of repose. However, water saturation can result in a decrease in the slope's stability since it acts as a lubricant and creates a detachment where mass wasting can occur.

Water content is dependent on soil properties such as grain size, which can impact infiltration rate, runoff, and water retention. Generally, finer-grained soils rich in clay and silt retain more water than coarser sandy soils. This effect is mainly due to capillary action, where the adhesive forces between the fluid, particle, and the cohesive forces of the fluid itself counteract gravitational pull. Therefore, smaller grain size results in a smaller surface area on which gravitational forces can act. Smaller surface area also leads to more capillary action, more water retention, more infiltration, and less runoff.

=== Vegetation ===
The presence of vegetation does not directly impact the angle of repose, but it acts as a stabilizing factor in a hillslope, where the tree roots anchor into deeper soil layers and form a fiber‐reinforced soil composite with a higher shear resistance (mechanical cohesion).

=== Roundness of grains ===
The shape of the grain can have an impact on the angle of repose and the stability of the slope. The more rounded the grain is, the lower the angle of repose. A decrease in roundness, or an increase in angularity, results in interlocking via particle contact. This linear relationship between the angle of repose and the roundness of grain can also be used as a predictor of the angle of repose if the roundness of the grain is measured.

== Slope stabilization ==
Since the stability of the slope can be impacted by external events such as precipitation, an important concern in civil/geotechnical engineering is the stabilization of slopes.

=== Application of vegetation ===
The application of vegetation to increase the slope stability against erosion and landslide is a form of bioengineering that is widely used in areas where the landslide depth is shallow. Vegetation increases the stability of the slope mechanically, by reinforcing the soils through plant roots, which stabilize the upper part of the soil. Vegetation also stabilizes the slope via hydrologic processes, by the reduction of soil moisture content through the interception of precipitation and transpiration. This results in a drier soil that is less susceptible to mass wasting.

Stability of slopes can also be improved by:

- Flattening of slopes results in reduction in weight which makes the slope more stable
- Soil stabilization
- Providing lateral supports by piles or retaining walls
- Grouting or cement injections into specific zones
- Consolidation by surcharging or electro osmosis increases the stability of slope

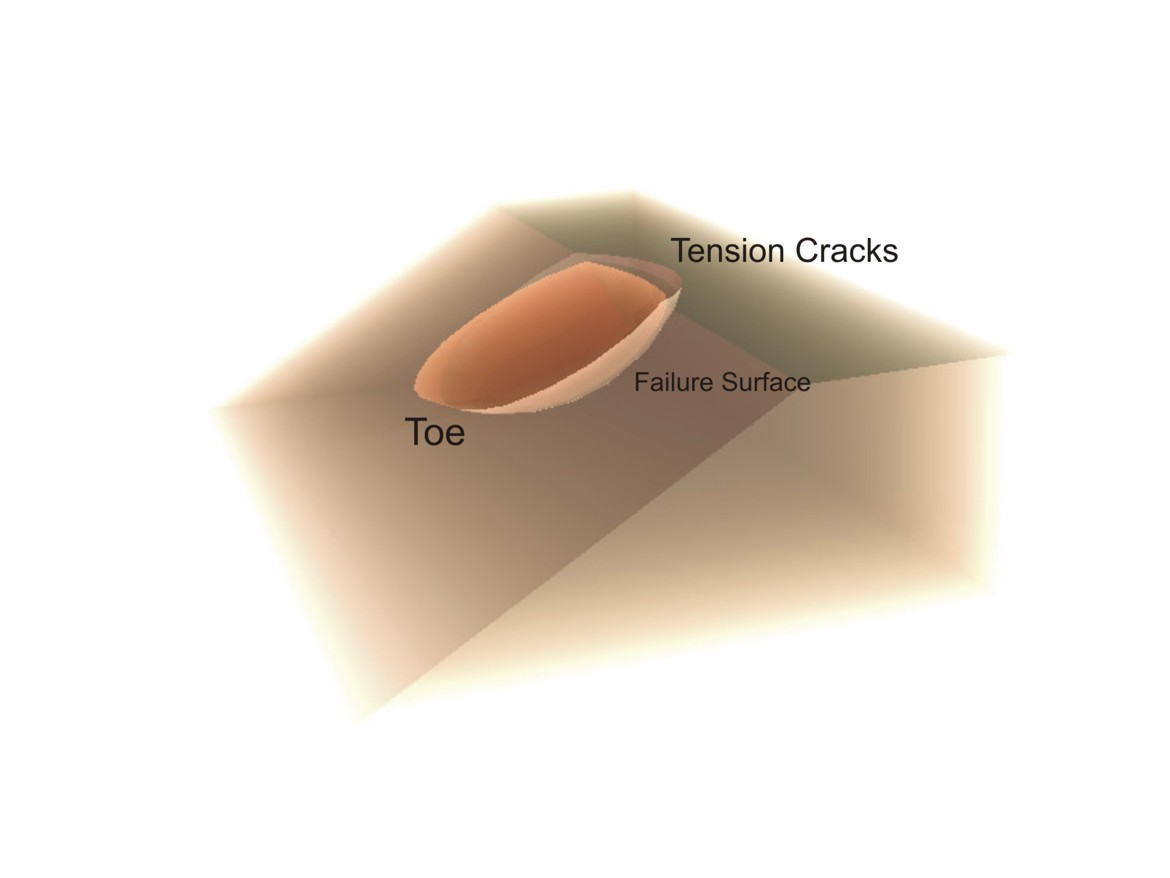
3D sketch of a rotational failure of slope on circular slip surface

== Analysis methods ==
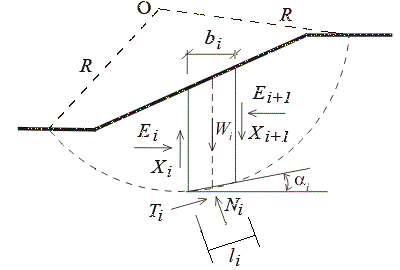
Method of slices

Slope stability analysis is a static or dynamic, analytical or empirical method to evaluate the stability of slopes of soil- and rock-fill dams, embankments, excavated slopes, and natural slopes in soil and rock. It is performed to assess the safe design of a human-made or natural slopes (e.g. embankments, road cuts, open-pit mining, excavations, landfills etc.) and the equilibrium conditions. Slope stability is the resistance of inclined surface to failure by sliding or collapsing. The main objectives of slope stability analysis are finding endangered areas, investigation of potential failure mechanisms, determination of the slope sensitivity to different triggering mechanisms, designing of optimal slopes with regard to safety, reliability and economics, and designing possible remedial measures, e.g. barriers and stabilization.

Successful design of the slope requires geological information and site characteristics, e.g. properties of soil/rock mass, slope geometry, groundwater conditions, alternation of materials by faulting, joint or discontinuity systems, movements and tension in joints, earthquake activity etc. The presence of water has a detrimental effect on slope stability. Water pressure acting in the pore spaces, fractures or other discontinuities in the materials that make up the pit slope will reduce the strength of those materials. Choice of correct analysis technique depends on both site conditions and the potential mode of failure, with careful consideration being given to the varying strengths, weaknesses and limitations inherent in each methodology.

Before the computer age stability analysis was performed graphically or by using a hand-held calculator. Today engineers have a lot of possibilities to use analysis software, ranges from simple limit equilibrium techniques through to computational limit analysis approaches (e.g. Finite element limit analysis, Discontinuity layout optimization) to complex and sophisticated numerical solutions (finite-/distinct-element codes). The engineer must fully understand limitations of each technique. For example, limit equilibrium is most commonly used and simple solution method, but it can become inadequate if the slope fails by complex mechanisms (e.g. internal deformation and brittle fracture, progressive creep, liquefaction of weaker soil layers, etc.). In these cases more sophisticated numerical modelling techniques should be utilised. Also, even for very simple slopes, the results obtained with typical limit equilibrium methods currently in use (Bishop, Spencer, etc.) may differ considerably. In addition, the use of the risk assessment concept is increasing today. Risk assessment is concerned with both the consequence of slope failure and the probability of failure (both require an understanding of the failure mechanism).

== Mass classification and rating ==
Various classification and rating systems exist for the design of slopes and to assess the stability of slopes. The systems are based on empirical relations between rock mass parameters and various slope parameters such as height and slope dip.

== Probability classification ==
The slope stability probability classification (SSPC) system is a rock mass classification system for slope engineering and slope stability assessment. The system is a three-step classification: 'exposure', 'reference', and 'slope' rock mass classification with conversion factors between the three steps depending on existing and future weathering and depending on the damage incurred by excavation. The stability of a slope is expressed as the probability of different failure mechanisms.

A rock mass is classified following a standardized set of criteria in one or more exposures ('exposure' classification). These values are converted per exposure to a 'reference' rock mass, compensating for the degree of weathering in the exposure and excavation damage. A new slope can then be designed in the 'reference' rock mass with compensation anticipating further damage due to excavation and future weathering. If an existing slope's stability is assessed, the 'exposure' and 'slope' rock mass values are the same.

The failure mechanisms are divided into orientation dependent and orientation independent. Orientation dependent failure mechanisms depend on the orientation of the slope to the discontinuities in the rock mass, i.e., sliding (plane and wedge sliding) and toppling failure. Orientation independence relates to the possibility that a slope fails independently from its orientation, e.g., circular failure entirely through newly formed discontinuities in intact rock blocks or failing partially following existing and partially new discontinuities.

In addition, the shear strength along a discontinuity ('sliding criterion') and 'rock mass cohesion' and 'rock mass friction' can be determined. The system has been used directly or modified in various geology and climate environments worldwide. The system has been modified for slope stability assessment in open pit coal mining.

== See also ==
- Deformation monitoring
- Retaining wall
- Slope stability radar
- Stereonet
