= Vegetation and slope stability =

Vegetation and slope stability are interrelated by the ability of the plant life growing on slopes to both promote and hinder the stability of the slope. The relationship is a complex combination of the type of soil, the rainfall regime, the plant species present, the slope aspect, and the steepness of the slope. Knowledge of the underlying slope stability as a function of the soil type, its age, horizon development, compaction, and other impacts is a major underlying aspect of understanding how vegetation can alter the stability of the slope. There are four major ways in which vegetation influences slope stability: wind throwing, the removal of water, mass of vegetation (surcharge), and mechanical reinforcement of roots.

== Wind throwing ==
Wind throw is the toppling of a tree due to the force of the wind, this exposes the root plate and adjacent soil beneath the tree and influences slope stability. Wind throw is a factor when considering one tree on a slope; however, it is of lesser importance when considering general slope stability for a body of trees as the wind forces involved represent a smaller percentage of the potential disturbing forces and the trees which are in the centre of the group will be sheltered by those on the outside.

Water transpiration

== Removal of water ==
Vegetation influences slope stability by removing water through transpiration. Transpiration is the vaporisation of liquid water contained in plant tissue and the vapour removal to the air. Water is drawn up from the roots and transported through the plant up to the leaves.

The major effect of transpiration is the reduction of soil pore water pressures which counteracts the loss of strength which occurs through wetting, this is most readily seen as a loss of moisture around trees. However it is not easy to rely on tree and shrub roots to remove water from slopes and consequently help ensure slope stability. The ability to transpire in wet conditions is severely reduced and therefore any increase in soil strength previously gained in evaporation and transpiration will be lost or significantly reduced, consequently the effects of transpiration cannot be taken into account at these times. However it can be assumed that the chance of slope failure following saturation by storm events or periods of extended rainfall will be lessened as a result of transpiration. Moreover, although changes in moisture content will affect the undrained shear strength, the effective shear stress parameters as commonly used in routine slope stability analysis are not directly influenced by changing moisture content, although the water pressures (suctions) used in the analysis will change.

Desiccation cracks can potentially be extended by vegetation in dry weather promoting the deeper penetration of water to a potential slip plane and increased water pressure into the soil during the wet periods. Nevertheless, these cracks will be filled by roots growing deeper into the soil as they follow the path of least resistance.

Studies in Malaysia have shown that there is a significant relationship between root length density, soil water content and ultimately slope stability. Slopes that had high root density (due to dense vegetation on the surface) were less likely to undergo slope failure. This is because a high root length density results in low soil water content which in turn results in an increase in shear strength and a decrease in soil permeability. It is suggested that root length density and soil water level could be used as indicators of slope stability and possibly could be used to predict future slope failure.

Transpiration is accentuated when the vegetation has an extensive root system and rapid transpiration continues throughout winter.

The removal of water is also affected by the shading provided by vegetation. Shading helps prevent the desiccation of the soils which results in shrinkage and cracking allowing the deep penetration of rain water. Plants need to have a high leaf to root ratio and have the ability to persist through hot summer months in order to provide effective shading of the soils.

== The mass of vegetation ==
The mass of vegetation is only likely to have an influence on slope stability when larger trees are growing on the slope. A tree of 30–50m height is likely to have a loading of approximately 100–150 kN/m2. The larger trees should be planted at the toe of the slope with a potential rotational failure as this could increase the factor of safety by 10%. However, if the tree is planted at the top of the slope this could reduce the factor of safety by 10%.

Each slope stability situation should be considered independently for the vegetation involved. Transpiration will reduce the weight of the slope as moisture is lost. This can be significant on slopes of marginal stability.

If larger trees are removed from the toe area of a slope there will be both a reduction in soil strength due to the loss of evapotranspiration effects and a reduction in applied loading which may result in temporary suctions in clay soils which could lead to softening as the available water is drawn in to compensate for the suction forces. This is similar to the recognised softening of overconsolidated clays due to the relaxation of overburden pressures when placed in the top layers of an embankment from deep cutting.

== Mechanical reinforcement of roots ==
Roots reinforce the soil by growing across failure planes, root columns acting as piles, and by limiting surface erosion.

=== Root growth across failure planes ===
When roots grow across the plane of potential failure there is an increase in shear strength by binding particles. The roots anchor the unstable surficial soil into the deeper stable layers or bedrock. This most readily occurs when there is rapid deep growth (1.5m deep) of roots which last for more than two years. However, the strength exerted by roots generally only extends down to 1 m (3.3 ft) while most failures occur between 1.2–1.5 m (3.9–4.9 ft) soil depth.

=== Root reinforcement model ===
The root Reinforced Earth root model is the result of the root elongation across a potential slip plane which produces a tensile root force which is transferred to the soil by cohesive and frictional contacts between the root and the soil.

=== Tensile root strength contribution and pull out resistance ===
The pull out resistance of a root is the measured resistance of root structure to be pulled out of the ground and is likely to be only a little less than the measured tensile strength of the root which is the roots resistance to breaking as measured in the laboratory. In the cases where there is no pull out data available the tensile strength data maybe used as a rough guide to the maximum pull out resistance available.

The tensile root strength of a range of diameters over a range of species has been tested in the laboratory and has been found to be approximately 5–60 MN/m2. In order for the root to actually enhance slope stability the root must have sufficient embedment and adhesion with the soil. The way that roots interact with the soil is intricate but for engineering purposes the available force contributions may be measured with in situ pull out tests.

=== Root morphology and modes of failure ===
The root length and the type of root branching effects the way that root failure occurs Three different modes of failure have been identified in hawthorn roots which relate to the root soil relationship which is shown in the shape of the roots and the shape of the failure curve. Roots which have no branches tend to fail in tension and pull straight out of the ground with minimal resistance. Roots which have multiple branches generally fail in stages as each branch breaks inside the soil. These roots can then separated into two different groups: 1) those that initially reach their maximum peak force and then maintain a high force that progressively decreases as the root branches fail after significant strain and 2) those that break with increasingly applied force. In a number of tests considerable adhesion between a segment of the root and the soil can be measured prior to the root eventually slipping out of the soil mass.

=== Type A failure ===
Roots that do not have branches generally fail in tension and pull straight out of the ground with only minimal resistance. The root reaches its maximum pullout resistance then rapidly fails at a weak point. The root easily slips out of the soil due to the gradual tapering (progressive decrease in root diameter along its length) which means that as the root is pulled out it is moving through a space that is larger than its diameter which consequently has no further bonds or interaction with the surrounding soil.

=== Type B failure ===
Type B failure occurs when branched roots initially reach their maximum peak resistance then sustain a high resistance which slowly reduces as the branches of the roots fail after significant strain. In some tests considerable adhesion between a section of the root and the soil mass can be measured before the root eventually slips out. Forked roots require a greater force to be pulled out as the cavity above the fork is thinner than the root which is trying to move through the cavity, this can then result in deformation of the soil as the root moves through the soil.

=== Type C failure ===
Roots that have multiple branches or forked branches also can undergo tensile failure but predominantly fail in stages as each branch breaks within the soil. These roots break with increasingly applied force in stages in the form of stepped peaks corresponding to the progressive breaking of roots of greater diameters. The root progressively releases its bonds with the soil until final tensile failure.

In some cases when the root has a sinusoidal shape with many small rootlets along its length the root reaches its maximum pull out resistance on straightening and then breaks at the weakest point; however, at this point the root is not pulled out of the soil as it adheres and interacts with the soil producing a residual strength. If pulling was stopped at this point, the root would give increased strength to the soil. However, if the root is completely pulled out of the ground then there is no further interaction with soil and therefore no increase in soil strength is provided.

=== Factors which affect root pull out resistance ===
Studies have shown that the pull out resistance of hawthorn and oak roots are affected by intra species differences, inter-species variations and root size (diameter) in a similar as way as root tensile strength varies (as measured in the laboratory). In the pull out test the applied force acting on the root acts across a larger root area, which involves multiple branches, longer lengths) than the short (approximately 150 millimetres (5.9 in)) length of root used in tensile strength tests. In a pull out test the root is likely to fail at weak points such as branching points, nodes or damaged areas.

The studies also showed that there is a positive correlation between maximum root pull out resistance and root diameter for hawthorn and oat root. Smaller diameter roots had a lower pull out resistance or breaking force than the larger diameter roots.

=== Root columns acting as piles ===
Trees and root columns can prevent shallow mass movement by acting as piles when there is buttressing and soil arching through a woody deep root system which has multiple sinker roots with embedded stems and laterals.

=== Limitation of surface erosion ===
Vegetation can also control water erosion by limiting surface processes such as sheet wash and overland flow. Vegetation can contribute considerably to slope stability through enhancing soil cohesion. This cohesion is dependent upon the morphological characteristics of root systems and the tensile strength of single roots.

There is considerable evidence of fine roots resisting surface erosion. The role of fine roots in general slope stability is not fully understood. Fine roots are thought to help keep the surface soil together and prevent surface erosion. The fine root network may have an apparent enhanced cohesion, which is comparable to geosynthetic mesh elements. The limitation of surface erosion processes is particularly apparent in areas of shrub and grass where the fine root distribution is consistent and clearly defined; however, cohesion is generally limited to the top 1 m (3.3 ft) of soil.

== See also ==
- Landslide
- Mudslide
- Surface runoff
- Tillage erosion
