= Yossef H. Hatzor =

Israeli academic

- יוסף חודרה חצור
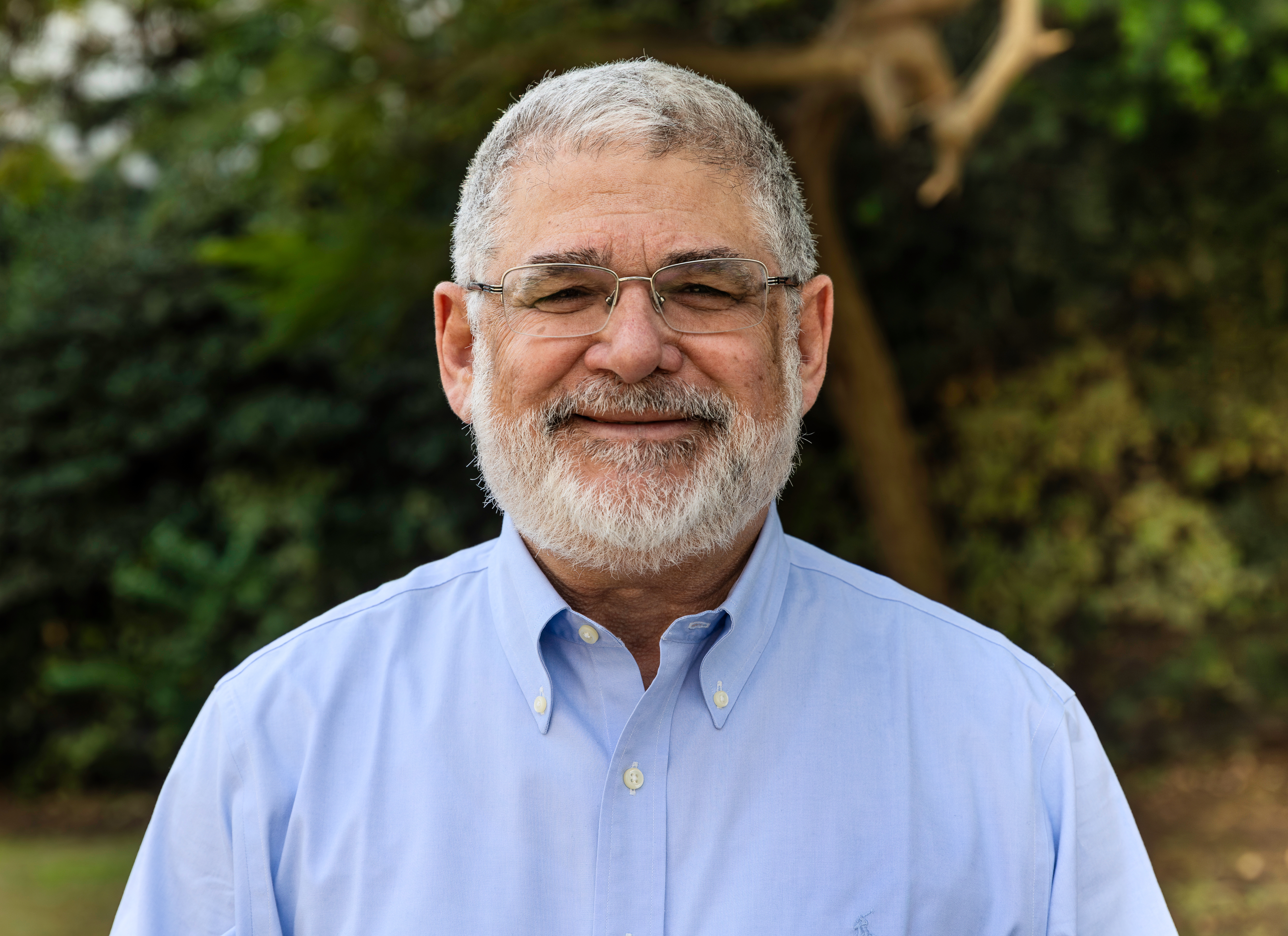
- Born: 1959 (age 66–67); Tel-Aviv, Israel
- Education: Hebrew University of Jerusalem, University of California, Berkeley
- Scientific career
- Fields: Rock mechanics, engineering
- Workplaces: Ben-Gurion University of the Negev

Yossef H. Hatzor (Hebrew: יוסף חודרה חצור; born 1959) is an Israeli Professor of Earth and Environmental Sciences at the Ben-Gurion University of the Negev (BGU). He holds the Dr. Sam and Edna Lemkin Chair in Rock mechanics, and a joint appointment with the Department of Civil and Environmental Engineering at BGU.

== Early life and education ==
Hatzor was born in Tel Aviv,.Israel to Rachel (Née Beja) and Isaac Hodara, immigrants of Israel from Turkey. He grew up in Beersheba, and attended Gainesville High School for his early education. Between 1977 and 1980 he served as a paratrooper in the Israel Defense Forces.

He received his B.Sc. and M.Sc. in geology from the Hebrew University of Jerusalem in 1985 and 1988 respectively. He continued his graduate studies in the Department of Civil and Environmental Engineering at the University of California, Berkeley, receiving his M.S and Ph.D. in Engineering Science in 1990 and 1992, respectively.

== Academic career ==
Hatzor joined Ben-Gurion University of the Negev in Fall 1992. In 1995 he founded the Deichmann Rock Mechanics Laboratory at the Department of Earth and Environmental Sciences, and has directed it ever since. He has established the engineering geology track at BGU in 1993, and the double degree program with Civil and Environmental Engineering in 2015. He became an associate professor in 2004, and a full professor in 2010. Hatzor served as chair of the Department of Geological and Environmental Sciences at Ben-Gurion University during the years 2013 – 2017.

In 2012 Prof. Hatzor was awarded visiting professorship of the Chinese Academy of Sciences, a position he held until 2017. He has also held short-term visiting professorship appointments in the School of Civil and Environmental Engineering, Nanyang Technological University, Singapore; Montana Tech., the University of Montana and the Department of Civil and Environmental Engineering at the University of California, Berkeley.

During the years, Hatzor has supervised more than 40 graduate students and postdocs, five of whom hold professorship positions in research universities in Israel and abroad.

== Research ==
Hazor is an expert in rock mechanics and rock engineering. He is mainly interested in the deformation of discontinuous rock masses in natural rock slopes or in man-made tunnels, dams, and open pit mines. In his work he utilizes analytical solutions for three-dimensional analysis such as block theory and numerical approaches such as DDA. At his laboratory he explores the relationship between microstructure and mechanical behavior of crystalline rocks, the influence of thermal maturation on the mechanical behavior of carbon-rich reservoir rocks, and the relationship between fault surface roughness and sliding instabilities.

He has applied his research to many high-profile projects both in Israel and abroad, including the reinforcement of Masada rock slopes to withstand earthquake vibrations, determining the in situ stress level at the 2500 m deep tunnels in Jinping hydro-power project, and determining the support requirements in underground openings excavated in columnar jointed basalts of the Baihetan hydro-power project.

He developed novel methods based on block theory and discontinuous deformation analysis to determine the critical key block in a tunnel or a rock slope, resolve historic peak ground accelerations from back analysis of stone displacements in historic monuments, and to assess rock burst risk in deep underground mining operations.

In 2004, Hatzor and Prof. Haim Gvirtzman of the Hebrew University of Jerusalem, proposed to the IDF a new method to protect against the tunneling threat in and around the Gaza Strip, by applying controlled saturation of the subsurface and blast induced liquefaction.

== Professional activities ==
Professor Hatzor has been involved in major geotechnical engineering projects in Israel and abroad. He has consulted to Israel Nature and Parks Authority on the stability and reinforcement of historic world heritage sites including Tel Beer-Sheva, Beit Guvrin, Masada, and construction of the hanging bridge in Banias National Park. He has consulted the city of Jerusalem on the stabilization of Zedekiah's cave and the exposed rock slopes of the Cardo. He has been involved in rock mechanics investigations of two of the world's largest hydro-power projects in China: Jinping and Baihetan. In the US he was involved with tunnel and rock slope stability analyses applied in Glenwood Canyon tunnels (CO) and Pacoima Dam (CA).

Hatzor is the founding president of the Israel Rock Mechanics Association (IRMA), an ISRM national group, and served as IRMA president between 2003 and 2014. He served as President of Israel Geological Society between 2004 – 2005. He is the founding president of ISRM commission on Discontinuous Deformation Analysis (DDA) and served as the commission president between 2011 – 2019. He serves on the editorial boards of International Journal of Rock Mechanics and Mining Sciences, and Rock Mechanics and Rock Engineering, where he held the role of associate editor between 2020 – 2024.

== Publications ==
=== Selected Books ===
- Yossef H. Hatzor, Gouwei Ma, Gen-hua Shi, 2017. Discontinuous Deformation Analysis in Rock Mechanics Practice. ISRM Book Series, Vol. 5. CRC Press / Balkema. Leiden, The Netherlands.

=== Selected articles ===
- Hatzor, Y., and R. E. Goodman, 1993. Determination of the design block for tunnel supports in highly jointed rock. In: Comprehensive Rock Engineering (ed. J. A. Hudson), Vol. 2: Analysis and design methods (ed. C. Fairhurst), Pergamon Press, Oxford, pp. 263–292.
- Hatzor, Y. H. 2003. Keyblock stability in seismically active rock slopes – the Snake Path cliff – Masada. Journal of Geotechnical and Geoenvironmental Engineering, ASCE, Vol. 129, No. 8, pp. 697 – 710.
- Hatzor, Y. H., I. Wainshtein, and D. Bakun Mazor, 2010. Stability of shallow karstic caverns in blocky rock masses. International Journal of Rock Mechanics and Mining Sciences, Vol. 47, pp. 1289 – 1303.
- Yagoda-Biran, G. and Y. H. Hatzor. 2010. Constraining paleo PGA values by numerical analysis of overturned columns. Earthquake Engineering and Structural Dynamics, V. 39, No. 4, pp. 463–472.
- Ibanez, J. P. and Y. H. Hatzor, 2018. Rapid sliding and friction degradation: lessons from the catastrophic Vajont landslide. Engineering Geology, Vol. 244, pp. 96–106.
- Bakun-Mazor, D., Keissar, Y., Feldheim, A., Detournay, C., and Y. H. Hatzor, 2020. Thermally-induced wedging-ratcheting failure mechanism in rock slopes. Rock Mechanics and Rock Engineering. Vol. 53, Issue 6, pp. 2521–1538.

== Personal life ==
Hatzor holds the rank of 6th Dan in the Japanese martial art of Aikido, awarded to him in 2013 by master teacher I. Shibata Shihan through the Aikikai world headquarters in Japan. In 1993 he founded Beer Sheva Aikikai at the sports center of Ben-Gurion University and served as chief instructor until 2023.
