= Rockfall protection embankment =

Type of earthwork

A rockfall protection embankment is an earthwork built in elevation with respect to the ground to intercept falling rock fragments before elements at risk such as roads and buildings are reached.

This term is widely used in the rockfall community but the terms bunds and walls are sometimes used as alternatives.

== Comparison with other passive mitigation structures ==
Rockfall protection embankments belong to the family of passive rockfall protection structures, comprising flexible barriers or galleries in particular. They are intended for rockfalls with kinetic energies up to tens of megajoules and are preferred over flexible barriers when the design impact is higher than 5000 kJ. Their declared advantages over other passive rockfall mitigation structures are low maintenance costs and reduced visual impact. Nevertheless, they are not appropriate on steep slopes and their construction generally requires extensive space and accessibility for heavy vehicles.

== History ==
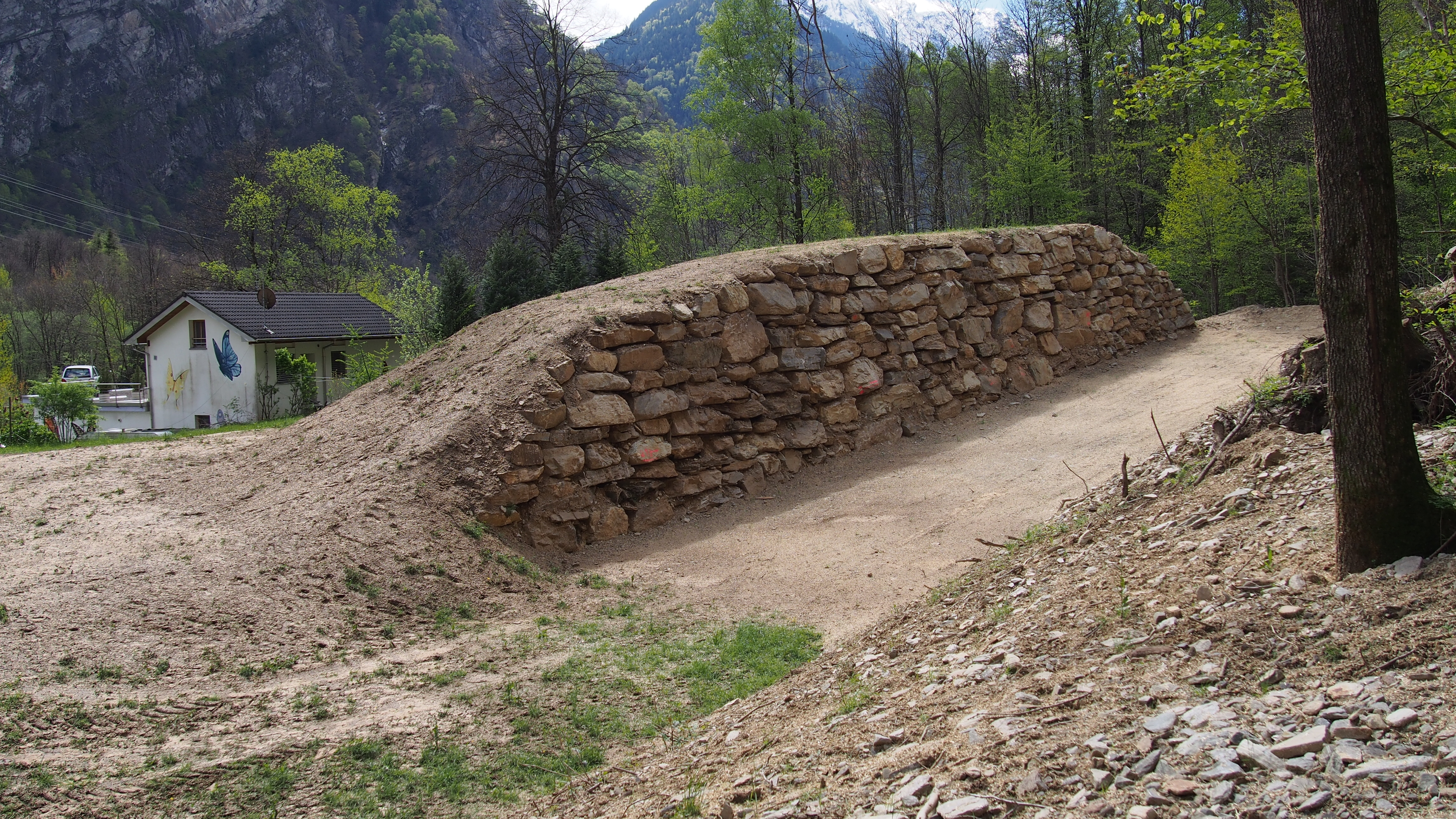
Small rockfall protection embankment; compacted ground and rockery facing. (Soazza, Switzerland)

The very first use of rockfall protection embankments dates back to the 1950s. Originally, embankments were mainly made from compacted natural soil and were designed for rather low-impact-energy events. Most often, embankments were trapezoidal in cross-sectional shape, some-times with a rockery facing. Ground-reinforced embankments were developed in the 1980s in view of increasing the height of embankments as well as their face inclination and impact strength.

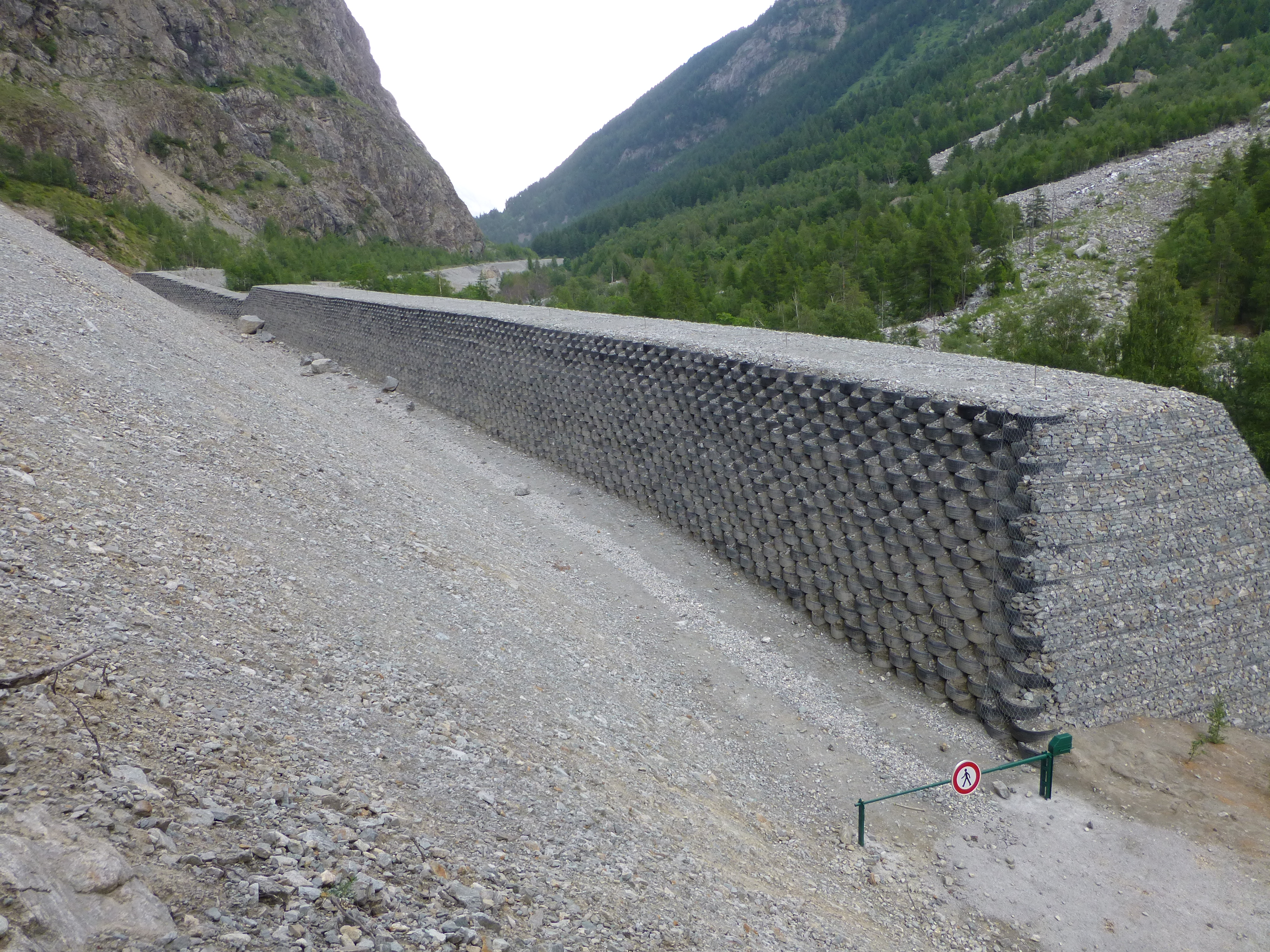
Rockfall protection embankment, 300 metres (1,000 ft) long and 7 metres (20 ft) high. Reinforced-ground and recycled tyres facing. (La Grave, France)

Nowadays, there exist a wide variety of designs. Embankments may in particular differ by their cross-section shape and by their constitutive materials, such as rockery, geotextiles, geogrids, recycled tires, wire mesh or gabion cages. Most common structures are ground compacted embankments with a rockery facing, while more impressive ones consist of earth-reinforced embankments (with height sometimes exceeding 10 meters). A French specificity also consists in using interconnected soil-filled recycled tires as facing material only or as both core and facing materials.

Recent developments concern embankments with reduced foot-print (slenderness ratio higher than 1), or associating different structural components or fills for improving the global structure impact strength and/or energy dissipative capacities.

== Design principles ==
Most often, rockfall protection embankments are erected at the toe of slopes, close to the elements at risk. The typical ranges for their height and length are 2–10 metres (10–30 ft) and 50–300 metres (200–1,000 ft) respectively. In the vast majority of cases, a ditch is associated to the embankment for containing the intercepted rock fragments.

The ability of an embankment in properly acting on rockfall propagation depends on its height and on its uphill face inclination. The embankment height is defined based on the rock block passing height at the embankment location, estimated from trajectory simulation numerical tools. A low vertical batter of the face prevents from block over-rolling.

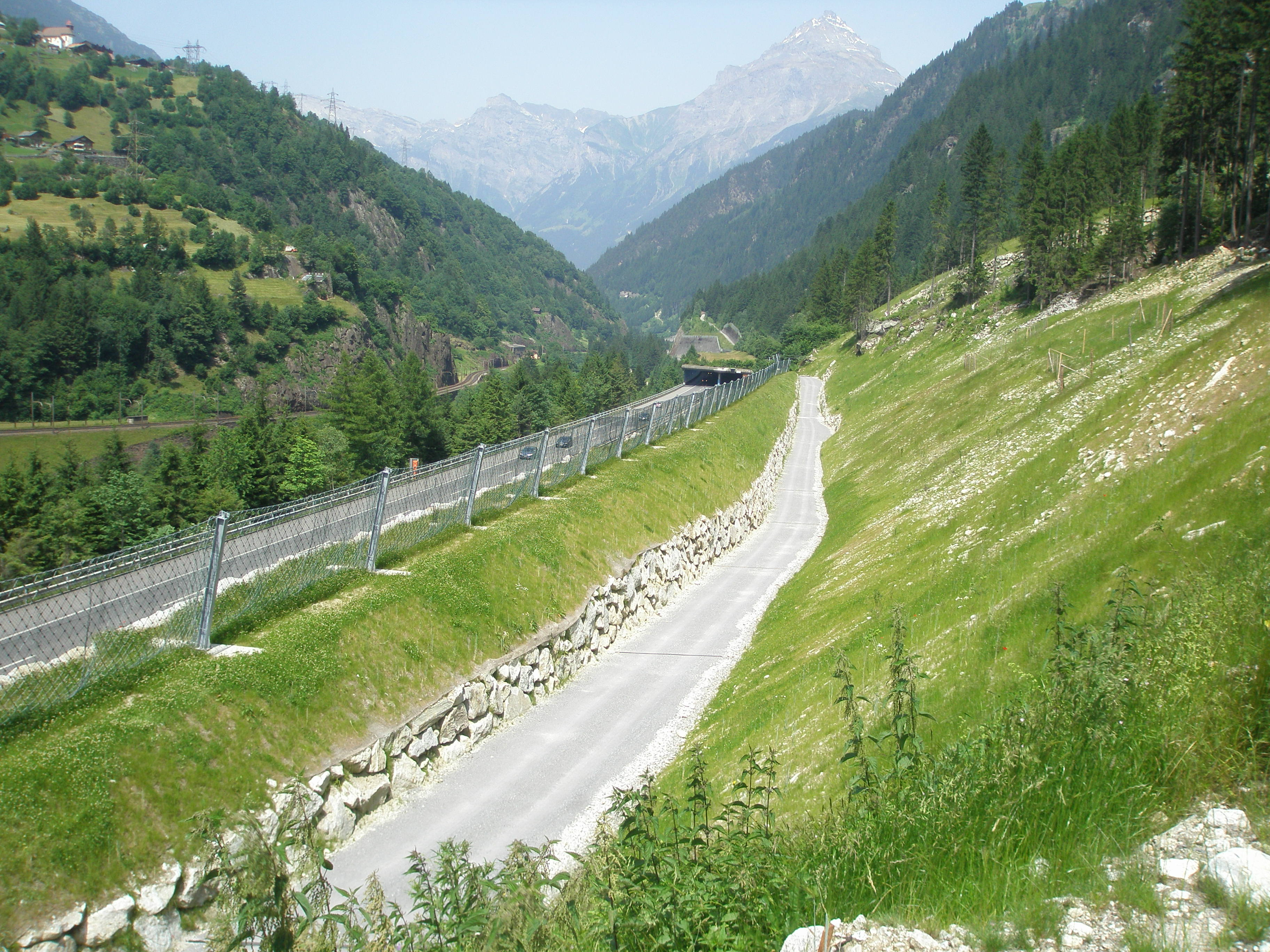
Rockfall protection embankment surmounted by a rockfall barrier (Gotthard Pass, Switzerland)

In addition to issues related to rockfall trajectory control and classical geotechnical issues (e.g. external stability), rockfall protection embankments are designed to withstand the localized dynamic loading resulting from the interception of the fast-moving boulders (rock fragments with up to tens of tons mass sometimes exceeding 30 metres per second (70 mph) in translational velocity). Different approaches may be used to assess their impact strength, including numerical simulations.

== See also ==
- Rockfall
- Slope stability analysis § Rockfall simulators
- Traffic barrier
