= Stabilization (architecture) =

Retrofitting of building foundations to improve stability

In civil and geotechnical engineering, soil stabilization (or ground improvement) refers broadly to methods used to improve the engineering properties of soil, including shear strength, mechanics, consolidation, and permeability. These methods may be applied to natural ground or existing soil beneath structures. In some contexts, such as foundation remediation, stabilization may include retrofitting or underpinning existing foundations to improve bearing capacity and reduce settlement.

== See also ==
- Landslide mitigation
- Foundation (engineering)
