= Flexible debris-resisting barrier =

A flexible debris-resisting barrier is a structure used to mitigate debris flows or to contain flow-entrained woods. These structures mainly consist of interconnected metallic components (cables, posts, shackles...). Flexible debris-resisting barriers are derived from rockfall barriers and were first proposed in the mid-1990s in the USA.

In torrents, flexible debris-resisting barriers constitute a sound alternative to check dams for containing debris flows.

The main components of flexible debris-resisting barriers are:

- An interception structure, made up of a principal net with metallic cables, wires, or bars and additional layers, usually a finer mesh than the principal.
- A support structure made of metal posts, to support the interception structure.
- Connection components (also called brakes), which dissipate energy from the barrier into the ground or foundation.

These barriers are often installed in torrent beds to intercept and contain flow-entrained granular materials or woody debris. In their simplest form, flexible debris-resisting barriers only consist of an interception structure. When installed in larger channels, the barrier also includes a support structure.

== See also ==
- Debris flow
- Check dams
- Rockfall barrier
