= Line of thrust =

Path of resultant forces within a structure

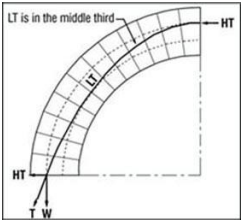
Illustration of a line of thrust

In structural analysis, the line of thrust is a line between the points at which the resultant internal forces act upon adjoining sections of a structure. The concept is usually applied to masonry structures, like arches or retaining walls. In a masonry arch, it represents the transmission of compressive forces through the stonework.

== Masonry structures ==
Thrust-line analysis is primarily a two-dimensional method, suitable for arches, flying buttresses and other structures whose behaviour can be examined through a section. For three-dimensional structures such as vaults, the approach can be extended by finding networks of compressive forces in equilibrium with the applied loads.

The method is related to Robert Hooke's funicular curve, an analogy between a hanging chain and an arch. A uniform chain hanging under its own weight forms a catenary and carries tension; inverting its shape gives the form of an arch carrying the corresponding loads in compression. For an arch, the equilibriumdepends on horizontal thrusts at the supports and therefore multiple thrust lines can be exhibited by arches of the same design.

== Safe theorem ==
The safe theorem declares that the structure is stable as long as the thrust line stays within the stonework. Giovanni Poleni's 1748 report on the state of the dome, written in response to observed cracking, anticipated the safe theorem by stating "explicitly that the stability of a structure can be established unequivocally if it can be shown that the thrust line lies completely within the masonry." According to Jacques Heyman, the masonry is in the theorem is assumed to have no tensile strength, unlimited compressive strength and sufficient friction to prevent sliding between its units. Under these assumptions, finding a thrust line that balances the applied loads and remains wholly within the masonry is sufficient to establish safety against collapse under those loads. The line does not need to correspond to the actual distribution of forces: any statically admissible solution satisfying these conditions is sufficient.

This criterion does not require confinement of the thrust curve to the middle third of the section, any location inside the thickness of the masonry will satisfy the requirement. In the idealized model, contact between the thrust line and an edge of a joint corresponds to the formation of a hinge. Collapse occurs when enough hinges form in the structure to allow it to move as a mechanism.

Application of the theorem to an actual structure requires checking whether its assumptions are appropriate. Crushing and sliding can cause failure even when an analysis that neglects them finds a thrust line within the masonry.

The theorem can be thought of as an application of the lower-bound theorem of limit analysis to masonry structures.

== See also ==
- Catenary arch
- Funicular polygon
- Limit analysis
