= Limit analysis =

Limit analysis is a structural analysis field which is dedicated to the development of efficient methods to directly determine estimates of the collapse load of a given structural model without resorting to iterative or incremental analysis. For this purpose, the field of limit analysis is based on a set of theorems, referred to as limit theorems, which are a set of theorems based on the law of conservation of energy that state properties regarding stresses and strains, lower and upper-bound limits for the collapse load and the exact collapse load.

== Theoretical formulation ==
Consider a structure subjected to loads $f_i$ proportional to a load multiplier $\lambda$ such that

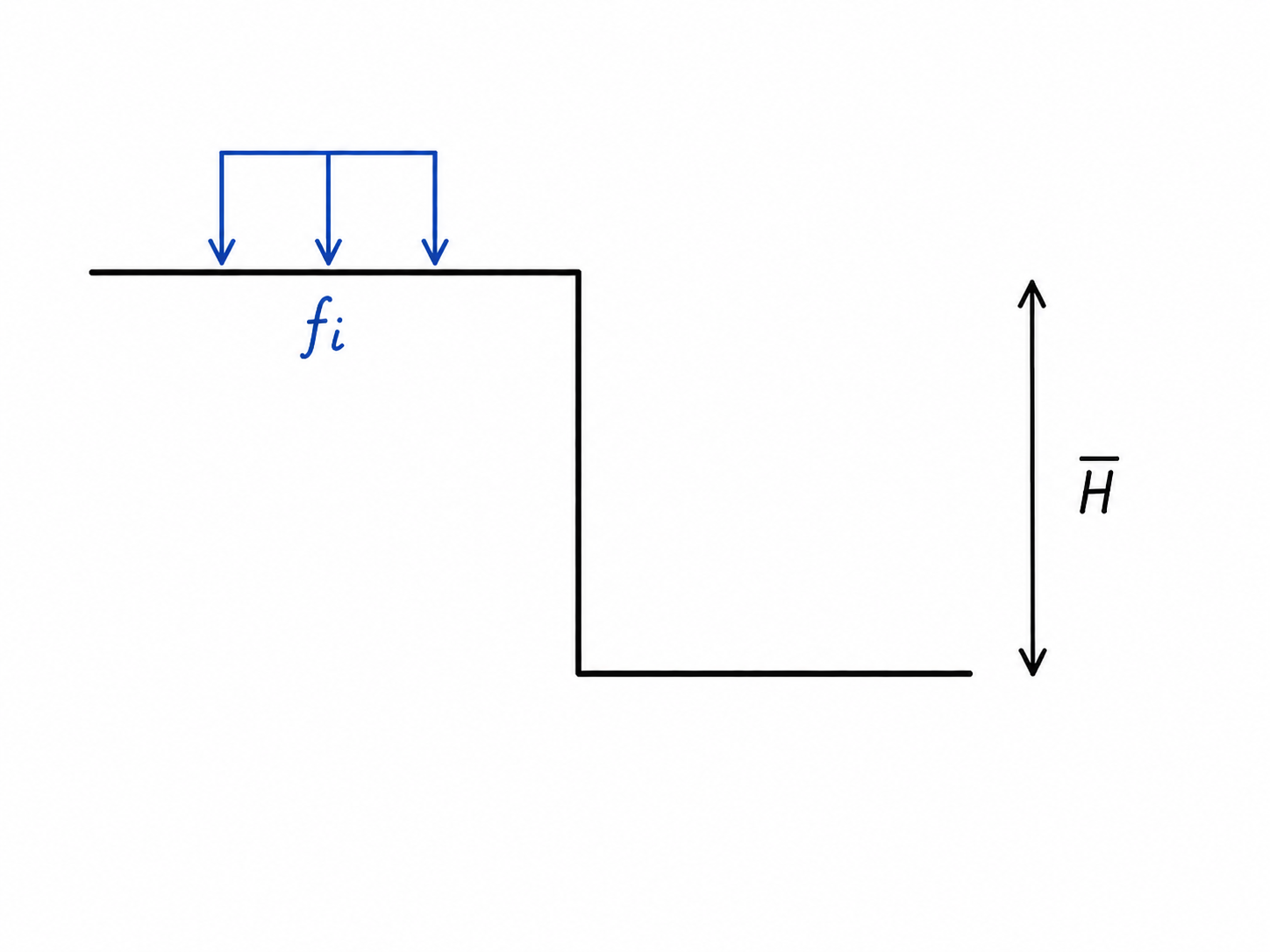
Excavation problem: determination of collapse load for the soil system with limit analysis

$f_i=\lambda f_0$

The basic idea of limit analysis is to determine the value of the load multiplier that brings a structure to the condition of incipient collapse. The problem is therefore to determine the critical value $\lambda=\lambda_c$

at which the system reaches the condition of incipient collapse.

== Assumptions of the limit analysis theorems ==
In its classical formulation, limit analysis is based on several fundamental assumptions:

- the material is assumed to be rigid-perfectly plastic, meaning that elastic deformations are neglected;
- the plastic flow rule is associated, meaning that the plastic potential coincides with the yield function ($F=G$);
- the plasticity function is convex;
- the strains are sufficiently small to allow the equilibrium equations to be written in the undeformed configuration.

== Static theorem ==
Under the assumptions listed above, the static theorem of limit analysis states that, if there exists a statically admissible stress field — that is, a stress field satisfying the equilibrium equations in strong form, namely at every point of the domain, the static boundary conditions, and the strength criterion of the material — then the load associated with this stress distribution will certainly be less than or equal to the limit collapse load.

In other words, the load determined in this way represents a lower bound of the solution

In formula form:

$\lambda^{st}\leq\lambda_c$

where $\lambda^{st}$ represents the load multiplier obtained by the static method.

In summary, in order to identify a lower bound of the solution, the static method requires:

- imposing the equilibrium equations in strong form and the static boundary conditions;
- imposing the constitutive law at failure.

== Kinematic theorem ==
The kinematic theorem states that, under the same assumptions, any kinematically admissible collapse mechanism provides a value of the limit load that is greater than or equal to the actual collapse load. A mechanism is kinematically admissible when the velocity field or virtual displacement field is compatible with the kinematic constraints of the problem and with the plastic deformation conditions imposed by the flow rule.

The load value associated with the mechanism is obtained by imposing stress equilibrium in weak form, that is, in integral form.

In formula form:

$\lambda^{cin}\geq\lambda_c$

where $\lambda^{cin}$ indicates the load multiplier obtained through the kinematic method.

In summary, in order to find an upper bound of the solution, the kinematic method requires:

- imposing equilibrium in weak form, that is, equality between the power of the external loads and the internal plastic dissipation;
- imposing the constitutive law at failure;
- identifying a kinematically admissible failure mechanism.

== Collapse condition ==
In light of the limit analysis theorems, the critical load multiplier which actually brings the system to collapse, lies between a lower bound obtained by the static method and an upper bound obtained by the kinematic method:

$\lambda_{st} \leq \lambda_{c} \leq \lambda_{cin}$

In order to identify the exact solution, it is therefore necessary to maximise $\lambda^{st}$ within the family of statically admissible stress fields and, conversely, to minimise $\lambda^{cin}$ within the family of kinematically admissible mechanisms. In this way, when the two values coincide, the limit load is determined exactly:

$\lambda_c = \lambda_{st} = \lambda_{cin}$

== Software for limit analysis ==
- OPTUM G2 (2014-) General purpose software for geotechnical applications in 2D (also includes elastoplasticity, seepage, consolidation, staged construction, tunneling, and other relevant geotechnical analysis types).
- OPTUM G3 (2018-) General purpose software for geotechnical applications in 3D (also includes other relevant geotechnical analysis types).
- OPTUM CS (Concrete Solutions) (2019-) 3D design and analysis software for both pre-cast and in-situ concrete (also includes elastoplasticity).
- OPTUM MP (2019-) Free 2D concrete slab design and analysis software.
- LimitState:GEO (2008-) General purpose geotechnical software limit analysis application. Uses discontinuity layout optimization.
- LimitState:SLAB (2015-) Limit analysis software application for slabs. Uses discontinuity layout optimization.

== See also ==
- Safe theorem
