= Juan Fernández hotspot =

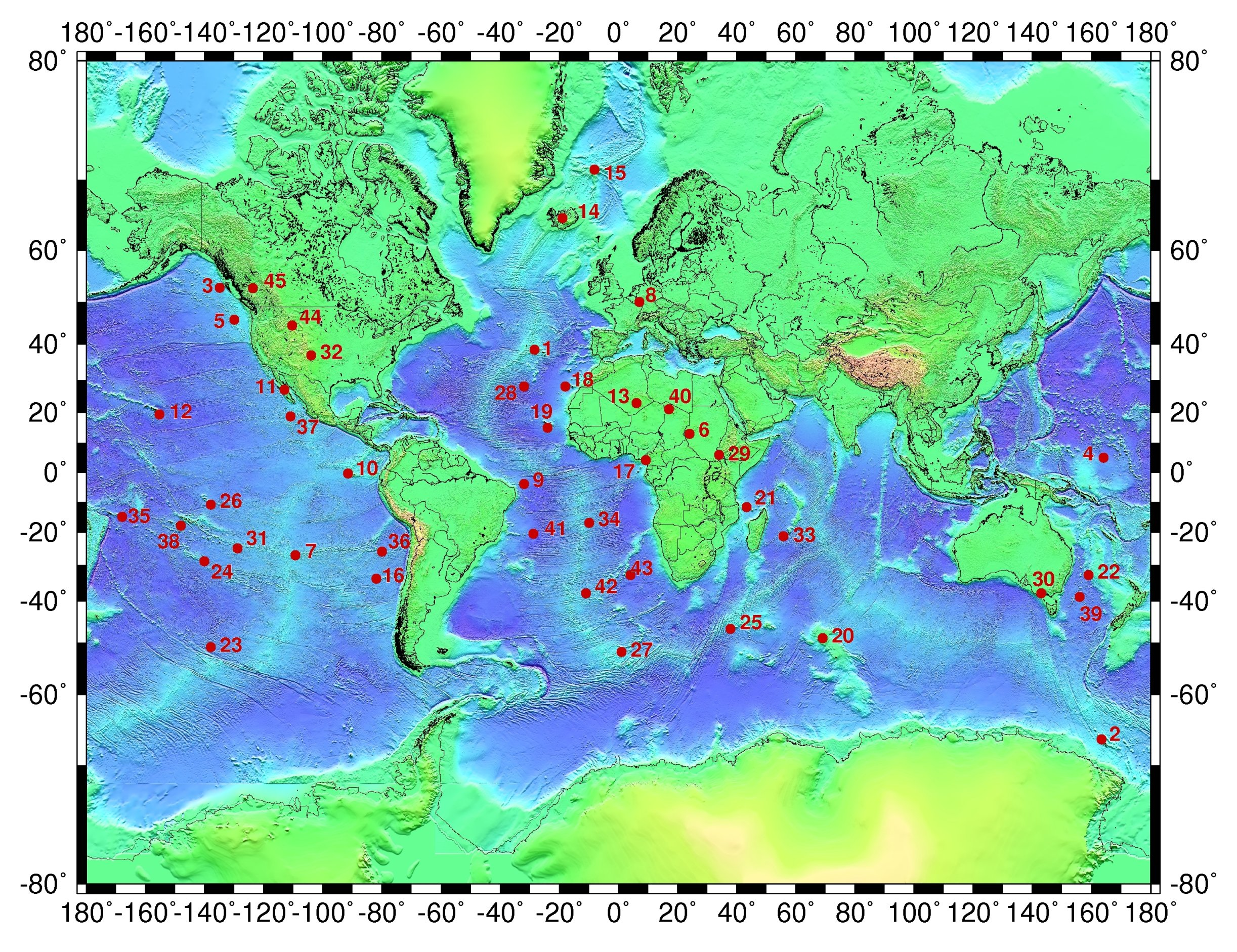
The Juan Fernández hotspot is marked 16 on map.

The Juan Fernández hotspot is a volcanic hotspot located in the southeastern Pacific Ocean. The hotspot created the Juan Fernández Ridge which includes the Juan Fernández Archipelago and a long seamount chain that is being subducted in the Peru–Chile Trench at the site of Papudo giving origin to the Norte Chico Volcanic Gap.

== Location ==
The Juan Fernández hotspot volcano group falls within the Southern Pacific Volcanic Regions. It forms the western end of the Juan Fernández Ridge, a chain of volcanic islands and seamounts on the Nazca plate. The Juan Fernández Ridge runs for about 800 km (500 mi) in a west–east direction from the Juan Fernández hotspot to the Peru–Chile Trench between the latitudes of 32-34° S before subducting beneath the South American plate near Valparaíso.

== Volcanoes ==
The Juan Fernández hotspot volcano group includes three volcanoes which were active during the Pleistocene, namely Robinson Crusoe, Alexander Selkirk and Seamount JF6.

== History ==
The Juan Fernández hotspot volcano group was formed as part of the Juan Fernández Ridge. The ridge was formed by upwelling of a deep plume of hot material from the mantle of the Earth. The ridge forms a deep underwater corridor about 3,900 m (12,800 ft) below sea level, and is made up of four island groups, with multiple summits. The ocean floor around the ridge is estimated to be 22 to 37 million years old.

The last reported eruption on the hotspot was in February 1839 when a submarine eruption occurred on Seamount JF6 at the eastern end of the Juan Fernández Islands. However, the reports have been considered highly suspect by the Global Volcanism Program.

== See also ==
- Easter hotspot
- Liquiñe-Ofqui Fault
- Patagonian Volcanic Gap
