= Jorge G. Zornberg =

Jorge G. Zornberg is Professor and Joe J. King Chair in Engineering in the geotechnical engineering program at the University of Texas at Austin. He has over 35 years' experience in geotechnical and geoenvironmental engineering. He is also one of the pioneers of geosynthetics.

== Biography ==
Jorge G. Zornberg earned his M.S. from PUC-Rio (Rio de Janeiro, Brazil) and his Ph.D. from the University of California at Berkeley.

In 2001, Zornberg received the Presidential Early Career Award for Scientists and Engineers under the National Science Foundation.

Zornberg was president of the International Geosynthetics Society from 2010 to 2014. Also, he chairs the Technical Committee on Geosynthetics of the Geo-Institute of ASCE (2018). Prof. Zornberg has authored over 500 technical publications.

Zornberg participated in the design of retaining walls, transportation facilities, mining lining systems and hazardous water containment facilities as a consulting engineer. He also conducts research on geosynthetics, soil reinforcement, unsaturated soils, liner systems and numerical modeling of geotechnical and geoenvironmental systems as part of his academic experience.

== Awards ==
- Collingwood Prize, American Society of Civil Engineers (ASCE), for the paper “Performance of Geosynthetic Reinforced Slopes at Failure,” by Zornberg, Sitar, and Mitchell, published in the Journal of Geotechnical and Geoenvironmental Engineering. October 2000.
- CAREER Award, National Science Foundation (NSF), for the project “Alternatives in Waste Cover Systems and in Engineering Education.” July 2001.
- IGS Award 2004, International Geosynthetics Society (IGS), awarded in recognition to “Advances in geosynthetic reinforced soil design.” Seoul, South Korea, June 21, 2004.
- Best Paper Award 2010, Geosynthetics International journal, awarded for the paper “Geosynthetic Capillary Barriers: Current State of Knowledge.” Vol. 17, No. 5, pp. 273–300.
- Best Paper Award 2011, Journal of GeoEngineering, awarded for the paper “Location of Failure Plane and Design Considerations for Narrow GRS Wall Systems.” Vol. 6, No. 1, pp. 27–40.
- J. James R. Croes Medal 2012, American Society of Civil Engineers (ASCE), for the paper “Centrifuge Permeameter for Unsaturated Soils I: Theoretical Basis and Experimental Developments,” published in the Journal of Geotechnical and Geoenvironmental Engineering, ASCE, Vol. 136, No. 8, pp. 1051–1063.
- Mercer Lecture Award, 2015–16, International Society of Soil Mechanics and Geotechnical Engineering (ISSMGE) and International Geosynthetics Society (IGS).
- Distinguished Lecturer 2015, 33rd Annual Distinguished Lecture Series, University of California at Berkeley, Berkeley, CA May 1, 2015.
- IGS Service Award, International Geosynthetics Society (IGS), awarded “In recognition to his outstanding commitment and dedication to the IGS, and in acknowledgment of the significant growth of the Society under his leadership,” Seoul, South Korea, 19 September 2018.
- Recognized with the “Zornberg Lecture,” an honorary lecture established in 2019, by the International Geosynthetics Society (IGS) in recognition of Dr. Zornberg's “major contributions to the geosynthetics discipline.”
- Best Paper Award 2019, Geotextiles and Geomembranes Journal, Elsevier. Awarded for the paper “A New Generation of Soil-geosynthetic Interaction Experimentation.” Geotextiles and Geomembranes, Elsevier.
- Best Paper Award 2021, Honorable Mention, Geosynthetics International journal, awarded for the paper “Use of Geosynthetics to Mitigate Problems Associated with Expansive Clay Subgrades.” Vol. 28, No. 3, pp. 279–302.
