= Deep crustal hot zone =

Zone in the lower crust where hot mantle material intrudes

The Deep Crustal Hot Zone (DCHZ), or just deep hot zone, is a zone in the lower crust where hot mantle material intrudes. In a volcanic arc setting, hot, molten material from the mantle may intrude into the lower crust. This hot material generates a new, more evolved melt in this area of the crust, which may collect and migrate upwards towards the upper crust. Here, it would collect in a magma chamber and later erupt.

The upper crust consists mainly of evolved, intermediate to silicic magmatic rocks. These rocks may form from either differentiation of primary, mantle-derived magma, or from partial melting of older crustal rocks. The DCHZ is a place where such evolved magmas may form.

== Dynamics ==
The hot mantle material is intruded in the form of a mafic sill. Sills of molten material are emplaced in the much cooler crust, so it quickly cools down and solidifies. Differentiation of the sill occurs since the more felsic components stay molten for longer. Furthermore, as in the Torres del Paine Sill Complex, the differentiation probably already occurs when the magma is ascending towards the sill and not within the sill itself. At the same time, the crust heats up and starts partially melting. A composite melt is formed, with parts from crustal partial melting and from differentiation of mantle material.

To migrate upwards, enough melt needs to accumulate so it becomes mobile. Whenever there is not enough melt, the rock is more of a crystalline mush, where melt is formed around grain boundaries. Once the melt fraction, the part of the rock which consists of liquid, reaches a certain value, the melt will be mobile enough to migrate upwards. This value is called the Solid-to-Liquid Transition (SLT) and has a value between 0.4 and 0.6.

Melt forms an interconnected network along grain boundaries at melt fractions larger than 0.01. This means that at this point, melt can start to slowly move upwards. It collects in layers on top of the mantle intrusions or just above it. It forms layers here since the overlying portion of the crust is much cooler than the hot zone where hot mantle material is continuously intruded. Thus, the melt cools down on the top of the layer until it approaches its solidus. Once it comes close enough, it cannot move upwards any more and forms a stagnant layer.

Melt keeps gathering in these layers until the solid-to-liquid transition is reached, and the melt migrates upwards again. The melt uses local features like dikes and faults to migrate towards the surface.

From numerical models, it is found that the formation of magma, which can migrate towards the upper crust, occurs at a depth of about 30 km. It takes between 10,000 years and 1 million years to form the magma, depending on the emplacement rate of the mantle material. The emplacement rates in volcanic arc settings can vary between 2 and 20 mm/year.

== Chemistry ==
The melt that is formed will consist partly of crustal material and partly of mantle material. It will have the chemical signatures of both crustal and mantle material. Because the melt consists of reworked mantle material and remelted crustal material, it will be more evolved than the mantle material that intruded. The material that will migrate upwards is expected to be mostly rhyolitic.
