= Laramide orogeny =

Period of mountain building in North America

The Laramide orogeny was a time period of mountain building in western North America, which started in the Late Cretaceous, 80 to 70 million years ago, and ended 55 to 35 million years ago. The exact duration and ages of beginning and end of the orogeny are in dispute. The Laramide orogeny occurred in a series of pulses, with quiescent phases intervening. The major feature that was created by this orogeny was deep-seated, thick-skinned deformation, with evidence of this orogeny found from Canada to northern Mexico, with the easternmost extent of the mountain-building represented by the Black Hills of South Dakota. The phenomenon is named for the Laramie Mountains of eastern Wyoming. The Laramide orogeny is sometimes confused with the Sevier orogeny, which partially overlapped in time and space.

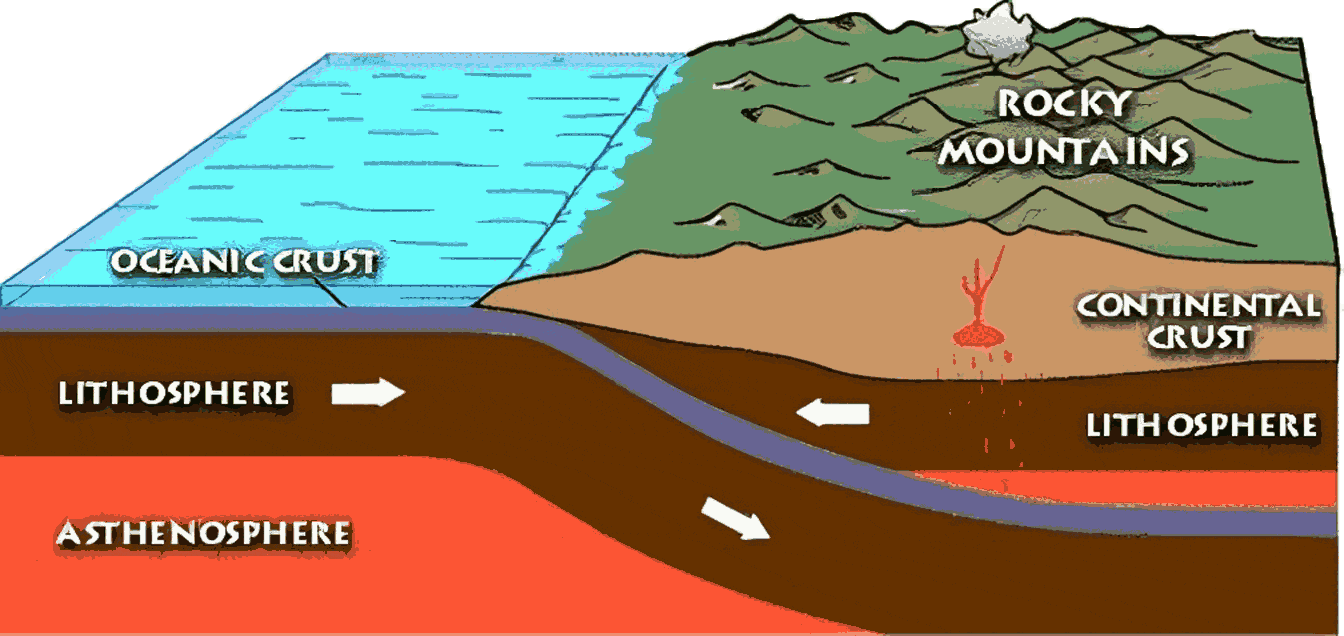
The Laramide orogeny was caused by subduction of a plate at a shallow angle.

The orogeny is commonly attributed to events off the west coast of North America, where the Kula and Farallon Plates were sliding under the North American Plate. Most hypotheses propose that oceanic crust was undergoing flat-slab subduction, that is, subduction at a shallow angle. As a consequence, no magmatism occurred in the central west of the continent, and the underlying oceanic lithosphere actually caused drag on the root of the overlying continental lithosphere. One cause for shallow subduction may have been an increased rate of plate convergence. Another proposed cause was subduction of thickened oceanic crust.

Magmatism associated with subduction occurred not near the plate edges (as in the volcanic arc of the Andes, for example), but far to the east, along the Colorado Mineral Belt. Geologists call such a lack of volcanic activity near a subduction zone a magmatic gap. This particular gap may have occurred because the subducted slab was in contact with relatively cool continental lithosphere, not hotter asthenosphere. One result of shallow angle of subduction and the drag that it caused was a broad belt of mountains, some of which were the progenitors of the Rocky Mountains. Part of the proto-Rocky Mountains would be later modified by extension to become the Basin and Range Province.

== Basins and mountains ==
The Laramide orogeny produced intermontane structural basins and adjacent mountain blocks by means of deformation. This style of deformation is typical of continental plates adjacent to convergent margins of long duration that have not sustained continent/continent collisions. This tectonic setting produces a pattern of compressive uplifts and basins, with most of the deformation confined to block edges. Twelve kilometers of structural relief between basins and adjacent uplifts is not uncommon. The basins contain several thousand meters of Paleozoic and Mesozoic sedimentary rocks that predate the Laramide orogeny. As much as 5,000 meters (16,000 ft) of Cretaceous and Cenozoic sediments filled these orogenically defined basins. Deformed Paleocene and Eocene deposits record continuing orogenic activity.

During the Laramide orogeny, basin floors and mountain summits were much closer to sea level than today. After the seas retreated from the Rocky Mountain region, floodplains, swamps, and vast lakes developed in the basins. Drainage systems imposed at that time persist today. Since the Oligocene, episodic epeirogenic uplift gradually raised the entire region, including the Great Plains, to present elevations. Most of the modern topography is the result of Pliocene and Pleistocene events, including additional uplift, glaciation of the high country, and denudation and dissection of older Cenozoic surfaces in the basin by fluvial processes.

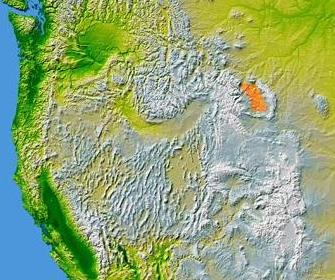
Topographic map of the western United States (and part of Canada) showing the Bighorn Basin (highlighted in orange), formed by the Laramide Orogeny

In the United States, these distinctive intermontane basins occur principally in the central Rocky Mountains from Colorado and Utah (Uinta Basin) to Montana and are best developed in Wyoming, with the Bighorn, Powder River, and Wind River being the largest. Topographically, the basin floors resemble the surface of the western Great Plains, except for vistas of surrounding mountains.

At most boundaries, Paleozoic through Paleogene units dip steeply into the basins off uplifted blocks cored by Precambrian rocks. The eroded steeply dipping units form hogbacks and flatirons. Many of the boundaries are thrust or reverse faults. Although other boundaries appear to be monoclinal flexures, faulting is suspected at depth. Most bounding faults show evidence of at least two episodes of Laramide (Late Cretaceous and Eocene) movement, suggesting both thrust and strike-slip types of displacement.

== Ecological consequences ==
According to paleontologist Thomas M. Lehman, the Laramide orogeny triggered "the most dramatic event that affected Late Cretaceous dinosaur communities in North America prior to their extinction." This turnover event saw the replacement of specialized and highly ornamented centrosaurine and lambeosaurines by more basal upland dinosaurs in the south, while northern biomes became dominated by Triceratops with a greatly reduced hadrosaur community.

== See also ==
- Laramide Belt
- Sevier orogeny, earlier than the Laramide orogeny, in the Cretaceous era
- Nevadan orogeny, still earlier, in the late Jurassic—early Cretaceous era
- Geology of the Rocky Mountains
- Geology of the Pacific Northwest
