= Flat slab subduction =

Subduction characterized by a low subduction angle

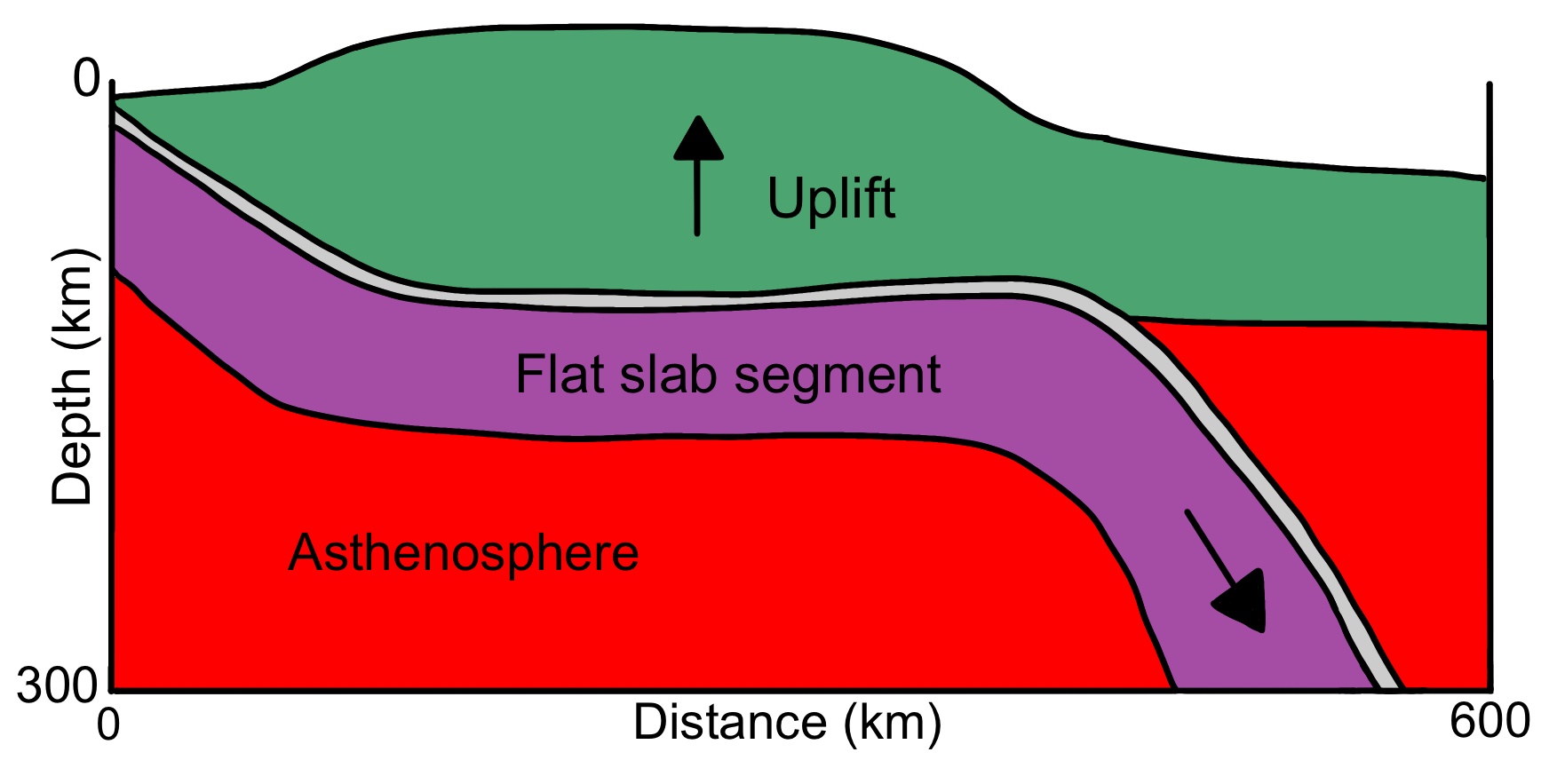
A diagram representing flat slab subduction

Flat slab subduction is a tectonic plate structure in which a continental plate sits above a subducted plate (a slab) sliding beneath it with a low subduction angle (<30 degrees to horizontal) beyond the seismogenic layer, and a resumption of normal subduction far from the trench. In a broader sense, the term may include any shallowly dipping lower plate, as in western Mexico. Flat slab subduction is associated with the pinching out of the asthenosphere under the plates, an inland migration of arc magmatic eruption (magmatic sweep), and an eventual cessation of arc magmatism. The coupling of the flat slab to the upper plate is thought to change the style of deformation occurring on the upper plate's surface and form basement-cored uplifts like the Rocky Mountains. The flat slab also may hydrate the lower continental lithosphere and be involved in the formation of economically important ore deposits. During the subduction, a flat slab itself may deform or buckle, causing sedimentary hiatus in marine sediments on the slab. The failure of a flat slab is associated with ignimbritic volcanism and the reverse migration of arc volcanism. Multiple working hypotheses about the cause of flat slabs are subduction of thick, buoyant oceanic crust (15–20 km) and trench rollback accompanying a rapidly overriding upper plate and enhanced trench suction. The west coast of South America has two of the largest flat slab subduction zones. Flat slab subduction is occurring at 10% of subduction zones.

== History of idea ==
The idea has its beginnings in the late 1970s. Seismic studies of the Andean margin seemed to show a zone of subhorizontal lower plate at a depth of 100 km. The Cornell-Carnegie debate between Cornell University geophysicists and workers at the Carnegie Institute of Washington centered on whether local deployments of seismometers would yield better results than looking at global (teleseismic) data. The Carnegie Institution seemed to have won the day with the local deployment imaging the flat slab where teleseismic data argued for a shallowing dipping slab with no near horizontal zone. The idea was taken up to explain the Laramide orogeny, as the flat slab subduction zones on the Andean margin are associated with more inboard surface deformation and magmatic gaps. Flat slab subduction is an active area of research; the causal mechanisms for its occurrence have not been sorted out.

== Causal mechanisms and consequences of flat slab subduction ==
=== Causal mechanisms ===
There are several working hypotheses for the initiation of flat slab subduction. The buoyant ridge hypothesis seems to be favored at the moment.

==== Subduction of buoyant oceanic crust ====
The subduction of bathymetric highs such as aseismic ridges, oceanic plateaus, and seamounts has been posited as the primary driver of flat slab subduction. The Andean flat slab subduction zones, the Peruvian slab and the Pampean (Chilean) flat slab, are spatially correlated with the subduction of bathymetric highs, the Nazca Ridge and the Juan Fernandéz Ridge, respectively. The thick, buoyant oceanic crust lowers the density of the slab, and the slab fails to sink into the mantle after coming to a shallow depth (~100 km) due to the lessened density contrast. This is supported by the fact that all slabs are under ~50 Ma. However, there are cases where aseismic ridges on the same scale as the Nazca Ridge are subducting normally, and cases where flat slabs are not associated with bathymetric highs. There are few flat slabs in the Western Pacific in areas associated with the subduction of bathymetric highs. Geodynamic modeling has called into question whether buoyant oceanic crust alone can generate flat slab subduction.

==== Trenchward motion of overriding plate with cratonic keel ====
Another explanation for slab flattening is the lateral movement of the overriding plate in a direction opposite to that of the downgoing slab. The overriding plate is often equipped with a cratonic keel of thick continental lithosphere which, if close enough to the trench, can impinge upon the flow in the mantle wedge. Trench suction is included in this causal mechanism. Trench suction is induced by the flow of the asthenosphere in the mantle wedge area; trench suction increases with subduction velocity, a decrease of the mantle wedge thickness, or an increase in the mantle wedge viscosity. Trench retreat is motion of the trench in a direction opposite to that of plate convergence thought to be related to the position of the trench along the larger subduction zone with retreat occurring near the edges of subduction zones. Modeling experiments have shown that if the cratonic lithosphere is thick and the trench retreats, the shutdown of the mantle wedge increases trench suction to an extent that the slab flattens.

=== Consequences ===
==== Delay in the eclogitization ====
Eclogite is a dense (3.5 g/cu. cm), garnet-bearing rock that is formed as the oceanic crust subducts to zones of high pressure and temperature. The reaction that forms eclogite dehydrates the slab and hydrates the mantle wedge above. The now denser slab more effectively sinks. A delay in eclogitization could arise through the subduction of zone thicker oceanic lithosphere without deeply penetrating faults. Oceanic crust is normally faulted at the trench rise by the bending of the plate as it subducts. This may be an effect or a cause of flat slab subduction, but it seems as though it is more likely an effect. A resumption of normally dipping subduction beyond the flat slab portion is associated with the eclogite reaction, and the amount of time needed to accumulate enough eclogite for the slab to start sinking may be what limits temporal scale of flat slab subduction.

==== Magmatic gaps and adakitic volcanism ====
As the subducting plate flattens there is an inboard migration in the magmatic arc that can be tracked. In the Chilean flat slab region (~31–32 degrees S), around 7–5 Ma there was an eastward migration, broadening and gradual shutdown down of the volcanic arc associated with slab flattening. This occurs as the previous magmatic arc position on the upper plate (100–150 km above subducting plate) is no longer aligned with the zone of partial melting above the flattening slab. The magmatic arc migrates to a new location that coincides with the zone of partial melting above the flattening slab. Magmatism before the Laramide orogeny migrated all the way to western South Dakota. Eventually, the magmatic activity above the flat slab may completely cease as the subducting plate and upper plate pinch out the mantle wedge. Upon the failure of the flat slab, the mantle wedge can again start circulating hot asthenosphere (1300 degrees C) in an area that has been heavily hydrated, but that had not produced any melt; this leads to widespread ignimbritic volcanism, which is seen in both the Andean flat slab effected regions and the western United States.

Adakites are dacitic and andesitic magmas that are highly depleted in heavy rare-earth elements and high strontium/yttrium ratios and may be derived of melting of the oceanic crust. Adakites are thought to erupt or be emplaced during the transition from normally dipping subduction to flat subduction as the magmatic arc widens and migrates more inland. Adakitic rocks can be seen in modern Ecuador, a possible incipient flat slab zone, and in central Chile there are 10-5 Ma adakitic rocks. Thus, adakitic rocks could be used as marker of past episodes of flat slab subduction.

== Surface deformation ==
Flat slabs are thought to result in zones of broad, diffuse deformation in the upper plate located far landward from the trench. Flat slab subduction is associated with basement-cored uplifts also known as "thick-skinned" deformation of the overriding plate like the Sierra Pampeanas in South America possibly associated with the subduction of the Juan Fernandéz Ridge. These areas of basement-cored uplifts are visually correlated with flat slab subduction zones. In contrast, "thin-skinned" deformation is the normal mode of upper plate deformation, and does not involve basement rock. Crustal shortening is observed to extend farther inland than in normally dipping subduction zones; the Sierra Pampeanas are over 650 km east of the trench axis. Flat slabs have been used as an explanation for the Laramide Orogeny and the central Altiplano-Puna region. Another interesting feature that may be associated with the flat slab subduction of the Nazca Ridge is the Fitzcarrald arch located in the Amazonian Basin. The Fitzcarrald arch is a long-wavelength, linear topographic feature extending from eastern Peru to western Brazil beyond the Subandean thrust front into an undeformed area and rising ~600 masl. The Fitzcarrald arch has the effect of splitting the Amazonian Basin into three subbasins: northern Amazonian foreland basin, southern Amazonian foreland basin, and the eastern Amazonian foreland basin.

== Seismicity ==
The shape of the flat slab is constrained through earthquakes within the subducting slab and the interface between the upper plate and the subducting slab. Flat slab zones along the Andean margin release 3–5 times more energy through upper plate earthquakes than adjacent, more steeply dipping subduction zones. Upper plate earthquake focal mechanisms indicate that stress is aligned parallel with motion of the plate, and that stress is transmitted high into the upper plate from the lower. The reason for this enhanced seismicity is more effective coupling of the upper and lower plates. In normal subduction zones the coupling interface, the area in which the two plates are in close proximity, between the two plates is ~100–200 km long, but in flat slab subduction zones the coupling interface is much longer, 400–500 km. Although the lower lithosphere of the upper deforms plastically, numerical modeling has shown stress can be transmitted to crustal regions which behave in a brittle fashion. Along the subducting plate seismicity is more variable, especially intermediate-depth earthquakes. The variability may be controlled by the thickness of the crust and how efficiently it can release water. Thick crust that is not as deeply fractured by trench rise normal faulting may not dehydrate rapidly enough to induce intermediate-depth earthquakes. The Peruvian flat slab lacks significant intermediate-depth earthquakes and is associated with the subduction of the ~17 km thick Nazca Ridge.

== Andean flat slabs ==
In the late 1970s early research recognized the unique nature of the two large flat slab subduction zones along the Andean margin of South America. Two large and one smaller current flat slab subduction segments exist along the Andean margin: the Peruvian, Pampean, and the Bucaramanga. Three Cenozoic flat slab segment are also known: Altiplano, Puna, and Payenia.

The Peruvian flat slab is located between the Gulf of Guayaquil (5 degrees S) and Arequipa (14 degrees S), extending ~1500 km along the strike of the subduction zone. The Peruvian flat slab is the largest in the world, and extends ~700 km inboard from the trench axis. The subducting plate starts at a dip of 30 degrees then flattens out at a depth of 100 km under the Eastern Cordillera and Subandean zone. The segment is visually correlated with the subduction of the Nazca Ridge, an aseismic ridge with thickened crust. The second highest zone in the Andes, Cordillera Blanca, is associated with the Peruvian flat slab segment and uplift of basement-cored blocks. Volcanism in the area ceased in the Late Miocene (11-5 Ma). Plate reconstructions time the collision of the Nazca Ridge with the subduction zone at 11.2 Ma at 11 degree S, which implies that the northern extent of the Peruvian flat slab may require some other subducted feature like an oceanic plateau. A putative subducted plateau, the Inca Plateau, has been argued for.

The Pampean or Chilean flat slab segment is located between 27 degrees S and 33 degrees S, extending ~550 km along the strike of the subduction zone. The Pampean flat slab similarly extends ~700 km inboard from the trench axis. The segment is visually correlated with the Juan Fernandez Ridge, and the highest peak in the Andes, the non-volcanic Aconcagua (6961 m). This area has undergone the same "thick-skinned" deformation, leading to the high mountain peaks.

The Bucaramanga segment was recognized in early eighties from limited seismological evidence. The segment is encompassed between 6 and 9 degrees N in Colombia, extending ~350 km along the strike of the subduction zone.

== Other flat slabs ==
There are several other flat slab segments that warrant a mention:

- Alaskan: 145–150 degrees W along the Aleutian Trench associated with the Yakutat microplate
- Costa Rica: 82–84 degrees W associated with the Cocos Ridge
- Mexico: 96–100 degrees W associated with the Tehuantepec Ridge
- Cascadian, United States: 46–49 degrees N associated with the subduction of young oceanic crust

== Economic geology ==
Subduction of thick oceanic crust could be linked with the metallogenesis of copper and gold deposits. The 10 largest young (<18 Ma) gold deposits in South America are associated with flat slab segments. Enhanced metallogenesis may be caused by the cessation of magmatism in the arc allowing the conservation of sulfur-rich volatiles. The failure of the putative flat slab under western North America may have been vital in producing Carlin-type gold deposits.

== Early Earth subduction ==
Early Earth's mantle was hotter and it has been proposed that flat slab subduction was the dominant style. Computer modeling has shown that an increase in oceanic plate buoyancy associated with enhanced oceanic crust production would have been counteracted by decreased mantle viscosity, so flat slab subduction would not have been dominant or non-existent.
