= Magmatic lull =

A magmatic lull is a period of declined magmatic activity in volcanically active regions. They may occur as a result of underthrusting of hinterland lithosphere beneath a volcanic arc, changes in subduction parameters such as relative velocity, direction and slab dip (e.g. flat slab subduction), arc-arc collisions and subduction hinge advance. Individual magmatic lulls may last tens of millions of years between periods of volcanicity.

Magmatic lulls can be related to volcanic gaps, which are regions lacking volcanic activity that separate two distinct volcanic zones. For example, the Andean Volcanic Belt of South America has three major volcanic gaps: the Peruvian flat-slab segment (3 °S–15 °S), the Pampean flat-slab segment (27 °S–33 °S) and the Patagonian Volcanic Gap (46 °S–49 °S).
