= Discrete element method =

Numerical method

A discrete element method (DEM), also called a distinct element method, is any of a family of numerical methods for computing the motion and effect of a large number of small particles. Though DEM is very closely related to molecular dynamics, the method is generally distinguished by its inclusion of rotational degrees-of-freedom as well as stateful contact, particle deformation and often complicated geometries (including polyhedra). With advances in computing power and numerical algorithms for nearest neighbor sorting, it has become possible to numerically simulate millions of particles on a single processor. Today DEM is becoming widely accepted as an effective method of addressing engineering problems in granular and discontinuous materials, especially in granular flows, powder mechanics, ice and rock mechanics. DEM has been extended into the Extended Discrete Element Method taking heat transfer, chemical reaction and coupling to CFD and FEM into account.

Discrete element methods are relatively computationally intensive, which limits either the length of a simulation or the number of particles. Several DEM codes, as do molecular dynamics codes, take advantage of parallel processing capabilities (shared or distributed systems) to scale up the number of particles or length of the simulation. An alternative to treating all particles separately is to average the physics across many particles and thereby treat the material as a continuum. In the case of solid-like granular behavior as in soil mechanics, the continuum approach usually treats the material as elastic or elasto-plastic and models it with the finite element method or a mesh free method. In the case of liquid-like or gas-like granular flow, the continuum approach may treat the material as a fluid and use computational fluid dynamics. Drawbacks to homogenization of the granular scale physics, however, are well-documented and should be considered carefully before attempting to use a continuum approach.

== The DEM family ==
The various branches of the DEM family are the distinct element method proposed by Peter A. Cundall and Otto D. L. Strack in 1979, the generalized discrete element method, the discontinuous deformation analysis (DDA) (Shi 1992) and the finite-discrete element method concurrently developed by several groups (e.g., Munjiza and Owen). The general method was originally developed by Cundall in 1971 to problems in rock mechanics. Williams showed that DEM could be viewed as a generalized finite element method, allowing deformation and fracturing of particles. Its application to geomechanics problems is described in the book Numerical Methods in Rock Mechanics. The 1st, 2nd and 3rd International Conferences on Discrete Element Methods have been a common point for researchers to publish advances in the method and its applications. Journal articles reviewing the state of the art have been published by Williams and O'Connnor, Bicanic, Bobet et al. (see below), and Vetter. A comprehensive treatment of the combined Finite Element-Discrete Element Method is contained in the book The Combined Finite-Discrete Element Method.

Discrete-element simulation with particles arranged after a photo of Peter A. Cundall. As proposed in Cundall and Strack (1979), grains interact with linear-elastic forces and Coulomb friction. Grain kinematics evolve through time by temporal integration of their force and torque balance. The collective behavior is self-organizing with discrete shear zones and angles of repose, as characteristic to cohesionless granular materials.

== Applications ==
The fundamental assumption of the method is that the material consists of separate, discrete particles. These particles may have different shapes and properties that influence inter-particle contact. Some examples are:

- liquids and solutions, for instance of sugar or proteins;
- bulk materials in storage silos, like cereal;
- granular matter, like sand;
- powders, like toner.
- Blocky or jointed rock masses

Typical industries using DEM are:

- Agriculture and food handling
- Chemical
- Detergents
- Oil and gas
- Mining
- Mineral processing
- Pharmaceutical industry
- Powder metallurgy

== Outline of the method ==
A DEM-simulation is started by first generating a model, which results in spatially orienting all particles and assigning an initial velocity. The forces which act on each particle are computed from the initial data and the relevant physical laws and contact models. Generally, a simulation consists of three parts: the initialization, explicit time-stepping, and post-processing. The time-stepping usually requires a nearest neighbor sorting step to reduce the number of possible contact pairs and decrease the computational requirements; this is often only performed periodically.

The following forces may have to be considered in macroscopic simulations:

- friction, when two particles touch each other;
- contact plasticity, or recoil, when two particles collide;
- gravity, the force of attraction between particles due to their mass, which is only relevant in astronomical simulations.
- attractive potentials, such as cohesion, adhesion, liquid bridging, electrostatic attraction. Note that, because of the overhead from determining nearest neighbor pairs, exact resolution of long-range, compared with particle size, forces can increase computational cost or require specialized algorithms to resolve these interactions.

On a molecular level, we may consider:

- the Coulomb force, the electrostatic attraction or repulsion of particles carrying electric charge;
- Pauli repulsion, when two atoms approach each other closely;
- van der Waals force.

All these forces are added up to find the total force acting on each particle. An integration method is employed to compute the change in the position and the velocity of each particle during a certain time step from Newton's laws of motion. Then, the new positions are used to compute the forces during the next step, and this loop is repeated until the simulation ends.

Typical integration methods used in a discrete element method are:

- the Verlet algorithm,
- velocity Verlet,
- symplectic integrators,
- the leapfrog method.

== Thermal DEM ==
The discrete element method is widely applied for the consideration of mechanical interactions in many-body problems, particularly granular materials. Among the various extensions to DEM, the consideration of heat flow is particularly useful. Generally speaking in Thermal DEM methods, the thermo-mechanical coupling is considered, whereby the thermal properties of an individual element are considered in order to model heat flow through a macroscopic granular or multi-element medium subject to a mechanical loading. Interparticle forces, computed as a part of classical DEM, are used to determined areas of true interparticle contact and thus model the conductive transfer of heat from one solid element to another. A further aspect that is considered in DEM is the gas phase conduction, radiation and convection of heat in the interparticle spaces. To facilitate this, properties of the inter-element gaseous phase need to be considered in terms of pressure, gas conductivity and the mean-free path of gas molecules.

== Long-range forces ==
When long-range forces (typically gravity or the Coulomb force) are taken into account, then the interaction between each pair of particles needs to be computed. Both the number of interactions and cost of computation increase quadratically with the number of particles. This is not acceptable for simulations with large number of particles. A possible way to avoid this problem is to combine some particles, which are far away from the particle under consideration, into one pseudoparticle. Consider as an example the interaction between a star and a distant galaxy: The error arising from combining all the stars in the distant galaxy into one point mass is negligible. So-called tree algorithms are used to decide which particles can be combined into one pseudoparticle. These algorithms arrange all particles in a tree, a quadtree in the two-dimensional case and an octree in the three-dimensional case.

However, simulations in molecular dynamics divide the space in which the simulation take place into cells. Particles leaving through one side of a cell are simply inserted at the other side (periodic boundary conditions); the same goes for the forces. The force is no longer taken into account after the so-called cut-off distance (usually half the length of a cell), so that a particle is not influenced by the mirror image of the same particle in the other side of the cell. One can now increase the number of particles by simply copying the cells.

Algorithms to deal with long-range force include:

- Barnes–Hut simulation,
- the fast multipole method.

== Combined finite-discrete element method ==
Following the work by Munjiza and Owen, the combined finite-discrete element method has been further developed to various irregular and deformable particles in many applications including pharmaceutical tableting, packaging and flow simulations, and impact analysis.

== Advantages and limitations ==
Advantages

- DEM can be used to simulate a wide variety of granular flow and rock mechanics situations. Several research groups have independently developed simulation software that agrees well with experimental findings in a wide range of engineering applications, including adhesive powders, granular flow, and jointed rock masses.
- DEM allows a more detailed study of the micro-dynamics of powder flows than is often possible using physical experiments. For example, the force networks formed in a granular media can be visualized using DEM. Such measurements are nearly impossible in experiments with small and many particles.
- The general characteristics of force-transmitting contacts in granular assemblies under external loading environments agree with experimental studies using Photo-stress analysis (PSA).

Disadvantages

- The maximum number of particles, and duration of a virtual simulation is limited by computational power. Typical flows contain billions of particles, but contemporary DEM simulations on large cluster computing resources have only recently been able to approach this scale for sufficiently long time (simulated time, not actual program execution time).
- DEM is computationally demanding, which is the reason why it has not been so readily and widely adopted as continuum approaches in computational engineering sciences and industry. However, the actual program execution times can be reduced significantly when graphical processing units (GPUs) are utilized to conduct DEM simulations, due to the large number of computing cores on typical GPUs. In addition GPUs tend to be significantly more energy efficient than conventional computing clusters when conducting DEM simulations i.e. a DEM simulation solved on GPUs requires less energy than when it is solved on a conventional computing cluster.

== See also ==
- Compaction simulation
- Movable Cellular Automata

== Bibliography ==
Book

- Bicanic, Ninad (2004). "Discrete Element Methods". In Stein, Erwin; De Borst; Hughes, Thomas J.R. (eds.). Encyclopedia of Computational Mechanics. Vol. 1. Wiley. ISBN 978-0-470-84699-5.
- Griebel, Michael; et al. (2003). Numerische Simulation in der Moleküldynamik. Berlin: Springer. ISBN 978-3-540-41856-6.
- Williams, J. R.; Hocking, G.; Mustoe, G. G. W. (January 1985). "The Theoretical Basis of the Discrete Element Method". NUMETA 1985, Numerical Methods of Engineering, Theory and Applications. Rotterdam: A.A. Balkema.
- Williams, J. R.; Pande, G.; Beer, J.R. (1990). Numerical Methods in Rock Mechanics. Chichester: Wiley. ISBN 978-0-471-92021-2.
- Radjai, Farang; Dubois, Frédéric, eds. (2011). Discrete-element modeling of granular materials. London: Wiley-ISTE. ISBN 978-1-84821-260-2.
- Pöschel, Thorsten; Schwager, Thoms (2005). Computational Granular Dynamics: Models and Algorithms. Berlin: Springer. ISBN 978-3-540-21485-4.

Periodical

- Bobet, A.; Fakhimi, A.; Johnson, S.; Morris, J.; Tonon, F.; Yeung, M. Ronald (November 2009). "Numerical Models in Discontinuous Media: Review of Advances for Rock Mechanics Applications". Journal of Geotechnical and Geoenvironmental Engineering. 135 (11): 1547–1561. doi:10.1061/(ASCE)GT.1943-5606.0000133.
- Cundall, P. A.; Strack, O. D. L. (March 1979). "A discrete numerical model for granular assemblies". Géotechnique. 29 (1): 47–65. doi:10.1680/geot.1979.29.1.47.
- Kafashan, J.; Wiącek, J.; Abd Rahman, N.; Gan, J. (2019). "Two-dimensional particle shapes modelling for DEM simulations in engineering: a review". Granular Matter. 21 (3): 80. doi:10.1007/s10035-019-0935-1. S2CID 199383188.
- Kawaguchi, T.; Tanaka, T.; Tsuji, Y. (May 1998). "Numerical simulation of two-dimensional fluidized beds using the discrete element method (comparison between the two- and three-dimensional models)". Powder Technology. 96 (2): 129–138. doi:10.1016/S0032-5910(97)03366-4. Archived from the original on 2007-09-30.
- Williams, J. R.; O'Connor, R. (December 1999). "Discrete element simulation and the contact problem". Archives of Computational Methods in Engineering. 6 (4): 279–304. doi:10.1007/BF02818917. S2CID 16642399.
- Zhu, H.P.; Zhou, Z.Y.; Yang, R.Y.; Yu, A.B. (July 2007). "Discrete particle simulation of particulate systems: Theoretical developments". Chemical Engineering Science. 62 (13): 3378–3396. Bibcode:2007ChEnS..62.3378Z. doi:10.1016/j.ces.2006.12.089.
- Zhu, HP; Zhou, ZY; Yang, RY; Yu, AB (2008). "Discrete particle simulation of particulate systems: A review of major applications and findings". Chemical Engineering Science. 63 (23): 5728–5770. Bibcode:2008ChEnS..63.5728Z. doi:10.1016/j.ces.2008.08.006.

Proceedings

- Shi, Gen-Hua (February 1992). "Discontinuous Deformation Analysis: A New Numerical Model For The Statics And Dynamics of Deformable Block Structures". Engineering Computations. 9 (2): 157–168. doi:10.1108/eb023855.
- Williams, John R.; Pentland, Alex P. (February 1992). "Superquadrics and Modal Dynamics For Discrete Elements in Interactive Design". Engineering Computations. 9 (2): 115–127. doi:10.1108/eb023852.
- Williams, John R.; Mustoe, Graham G. W., eds. (1993). Proceedings of the 2nd International Conference on Discrete Element Methods (DEM) (2nd ed.). Cambridge, MA: IESL Publications. ISBN 978-0-918062-88-8.
