= Peter A. Cundall =

British engineer

Peter Alan Cundall is an engineer and one of the founders of the Itasca Consulting Group. Together with Otto D. L. Strack, he introduced the Discrete Element Method.

He studied for a PhD in Rock Mechanics at Imperial College London, graduating in 1971 with a thesis titled "The measurement and analysis of accelerations in rock slopes". In 1979, he published "A discrete numerical model for granular assemblies", with Otto Strack, which was the most-widely cited paper in the journal Géotechnique, and which set the ground for the development of the DEM method. He served as Faculty member at the University of Minnesota for some time and then he went on to form Itasca Consulting Group.

In 2008, Cundall was elected as a member into the National Academy of Engineering for fundamental contributions to understanding of rock deformation and failure processes, and development of innovative computational procedures in rock mechanics.
