= Compaction simulation =

Compaction simulation is the modelling of granular matter when compressed into a dense state that is achieved through the reduction of the air void. The term is also commonly used to mean compaction using a compaction simulator. This is a high performance programmable servo-controlled press for simulating production presses, typically in the pharmaceutical, catalyst, battery and magnet industries.

Three stages are included in the compaction process those are filling or packing, compaction and ejection. During the compaction process, if the loading pressure is increasing straightly, the powder assembly will experience three stages. First of all, particles are filling the voids and set up contacts with the adjacent particles. This stage is termed rearrangement stage. After most contacts are set up, the initial compaction started. Elastic deformation and plastic deformation happens and the loading pressure increases sharply. The third stage is breakage where the particles breaks into fragments.

Discrete element method (DEM) is an explicit numerical model capable of tracking the motion and interaction of individual modeled particles. DEM has enhanced rapidly our understanding of granular system by producing quantitative predictions rather than only qualitative description, increased our insight into particle assemblies by providing both microscopic and macroscopic information. DEM has been proved to be of great potential in scientific tasks and industries, including chemical and mechanical engineering, food industry, geo-sciences and agriculture.

The translational and rotational movement of each particle can be calculated by Newton's second law of motion. Forces involved are normally particle gravity and inter-particle contact forces including normal and tangential force. Other forces are van der Waals force and capillary force for fine and wet particles system respectively.

The whole simulation process includes compaction and breakage, involves four stages: packing, compaction, relaxation and crushing. At the beginning of packing stage, modeled particles were generated randomly in a square space and allowed to fall under gravity with a small initial velocity to form a packing. There are no overlaps between the particles, and the walls. Then the packing bed is compressed by a modeled plane at a low speed, most of the time, it is set to 10d/s. When the compact density reaches the set value, for example 0.75, the loading process stops and the plane goes up with the speed 5d/s. The compaction stage is ended when the top plane leaves the highest particle. In the recently research, periodical boundaries are used during the packing and compaction stages to exclude the effect of wall.
