= Pampean flat-slab =

Geologic zone in Argentina

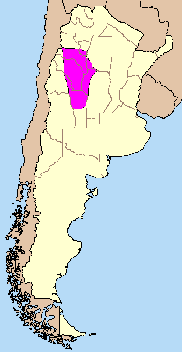
Sierras Pampeanas, extra-Andean mountains uplifted by the Pampean flat-slab in the Neogene and Quaternary epochs.

The Pampean flat-slab is the low angle subduction of oceanic lithosphere beneath Northern Argentina. The Pampean flat-slab is one of three flat slabs in South America, the other being the Peruvian flat-slab and the Bucaramanga flat-slab.

It is thought that the subduction of the Juan Fernández Ridge, a chain of extinct volcanoes on the Nazca Plate, is the underlying cause of the Pampean flat-slab.

== Effects ==
The shallowing of subducted slab beneath north-central Chile and Argentina is linked to a series of changes in volcanism and tectonics.

=== Deformation of crust ===
The flat-slab has caused an uplift of Sierras Pampeanas which begun first in the north and then moved southwards over millions of years. The oldest noted uplift episode associated with Pampean flat-slab is that of Sierra de Aconquija (27 °S) from 7.6 to 6 million years ago (Ma) in the Late Miocene epoch. This was followed by the uplift of massifs further south such as Sierra de Famatina (29 °S) that rose 4.5 to 4.19 Ma ago. Next to rise was Sierra de Pocho (31 °S) 5.5 to 4.7 Ma ago followed by Sierra de San Luis (33 °S) 2.6 Ma ago.

At latitude 33 °S deformation of the Andes proper has changed as the slab underneath has gradually shallowed. Thrust front propagation of the Principal Cordillera has increased five-fold in from 15-9 Ma ago to the Pliocene and Early Quaternary. Slightly east the Frontal Cordillera was greatly uplifted 9 million years ago.

=== Volcanic gap ===
The Pampean flat-slab has also caused a lull in the volcanism in the Andes seen in the lack of modern volcanoes between the Central Andean Volcanic Zone and the Southern Andean Volcanic Zone. As the flat slab migrated from west to east under South America, so did volcanic activity, until it vanished 1.9 Ma ago, about 750 kilometres (470 mi) from the Pacific, far to the east of ordinary subduction volcanism. Migration of the volcanic activity to the east meant that in the Principal Cordillera magmatic activity ended as early as 8.6 Ma ago.
