= Subduction =

Geological process at tectonic plate boundaries

Diagram of the geological process of subduction

Subduction is a geological process in which the oceanic lithosphere and some continental lithosphere is recycled into the Earth's mantle at the convergent boundaries between tectonic plates. Where one tectonic plate converges with a second plate, the heavier plate dives beneath the other and sinks into the mantle. A region where this process occurs is known as a subduction zone, and its surface expression is known as an arc-trench complex. The process of subduction has created most of the Earth's continental crust. Rates of subduction are typically measured in centimeters per year, with rates of convergence as high as 11 cm/year.

Subduction is possible because the cold and rigid oceanic lithosphere is slightly denser than the underlying asthenosphere, the hot, ductile layer in the upper mantle. Once initiated, stable subduction is driven mostly by the negative buoyancy of the dense subducting lithosphere. The down-going slab sinks into the mantle largely under its own weight.

Earthquakes are common along subduction zones, and fluids released by the subducting plate trigger volcanism in the overriding plate. If the subducting plate sinks at a shallow angle, the overriding plate develops a belt of deformation characterized by crustal thickening, mountain building, and metamorphism. Subduction at a steeper angle is characterized by the formation of back-arc basins.

== Subduction and plate tectonics ==
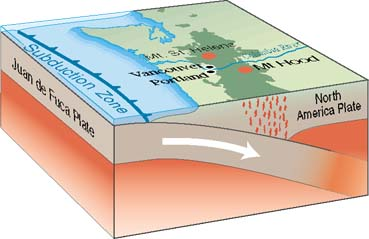
The Juan de Fuca plate sinks below the North America plate at the Cascadia subduction zone

The simplified model of mantle convection: Oceanic plates are subducted creating oceanic trenches.

According to the theory of plate tectonics, the Earth's lithosphere, its rigid outer shell, is broken into sixteen larger tectonic plates and several smaller plates. These plates are in slow motion, due mostly to the pull force of subducting lithosphere. Sinking lithosphere at subduction zones is a part of convection cells in the underlying ductile mantle. This process of convection allows heat generated by radioactive decay to escape from the Earth's interior.

The lithosphere consists of the outermost light crust plus the uppermost rigid portion of the mantle. Oceanic lithosphere ranges in thickness from just a few km for young lithosphere created at mid-ocean ridges to around 100 km (62 mi) for the oldest oceanic lithosphere. Continental lithosphere is up to 200 km (120 mi) thick. The lithosphere is relatively cold and rigid compared with the underlying asthenosphere, and so tectonic plates move as solid bodies atop the asthenosphere. Individual plates often include both regions of the oceanic lithosphere and continental lithosphere.

Subduction zones are where cold oceanic lithosphere sinks back into the mantle and is recycled. They are found at convergent plate boundaries, where the heavier oceanic lithosphere of one plate is overridden by the leading edge of another, less-dense plate. The overridden plate (the slab) sinks at an angle most commonly between 25 and 75 degrees to the Earth's surface. This sinking is driven by the temperature difference between the slab and the surrounding asthenosphere, as the colder oceanic lithosphere is, on average, more dense. Sediments and some trapped water are carried downwards by the slab and recycled into the deep mantle.

So far, Earth is the only planet where subduction is known to occur, and subduction zones are its most important tectonic feature. Subduction is the driving force behind plate tectonics, and without it, plate tectonics could not occur. Oceanic subduction zones are located along 55,000 km (34,000 mi) of convergent plate margins, almost equal to the cumulative plate formation rate of 60,000 km (37,000 mi) of mid-ocean ridges.

Sea water seeps into oceanic lithosphere through fractures and pores, and reacts with minerals in the crust and mantle to form hydrous minerals (such as serpentine) that store water in their crystal structures. Water is transported into the deep mantle via hydrous minerals in subducting slabs. During subduction, a series of minerals in these slabs such as serpentine can be stable at different pressures within the slab geotherms, and may transport a significant amount of water into the Earth's interior. As plates sink and heat up, released fluids can trigger seismicity and induce melting within the subducted plate and in the overlying mantle wedge. This type of melting selectively concentrates volatiles and transports them into the overlying plate. If an eruption occurs, the cycle then returns the volatiles into the oceans and atmosphere.

== Structure of subduction zones ==
=== Arc-trench complex ===
The surface expressions of subduction zones are arc-trench complexes. On the ocean side of the complex, where the subducting plate first approaches the subduction zone, there is often an outer trench high or outer trench swell. Here the plate shallows slightly before plunging downwards, as a consequence of the rigidity of the plate. The point where the slab begins to plunge downwards is marked by an oceanic trench. Oceanic trenches are the deepest parts of the ocean floor.

Beyond the trench is the forearc portion of the overriding plate. Depending on sedimentation rates, the forearc may include an accretionary wedge of sediments scraped off the subducting slab and accreted to the overriding plate. However, not all arc-trench complexes have an accretionary wedge. Accretionary arcs have a well-developed forearc basin behind the accretionary wedge, while the forearc basin is poorly developed in non-accretionary arcs.

Beyond the forearc basin, volcanoes are found in long chains called volcanic arcs. The subducting basalt and sediment are normally rich in hydrous minerals and clays. Additionally, large quantities of water are introduced into cracks and fractures created as the subducting slab bends downward. During the transition from basalt to eclogite, these hydrous materials break down, producing copious quantities of water, which at such great pressure and temperature exists as a supercritical fluid. The supercritical water, which is hot and more buoyant than the surrounding rock, rises into the overlying mantle, where it lowers the melting temperature of the mantle rock, generating magma via flux melting. The magmas, in turn, rise as diapirs because they are less dense than the rocks of the mantle. The mantle-derived magmas (which are initially basaltic in composition) can ultimately reach the Earth's surface, resulting in volcanic eruptions. The chemical composition of the erupting lava depends upon the degree to which the mantle-derived basalt interacts with (melts) Earth's crust or undergoes fractional crystallization. Arc volcanoes tend to produce dangerous eruptions because they are rich in water (from the slab and sediments) and tend to be extremely explosive. Krakatoa, Nevado del Ruiz, and Mount Vesuvius are all examples of arc volcanoes. Arcs are also associated with most ore deposits.

Beyond the volcanic arc is a back-arc region whose character depends strongly on the angle of subduction of the subducting slab. Where this angle is shallow, the subducting slab drags the overlying continental crust partially with it, which produces a zone of shortening and crustal thickening in which there may be extensive folding and thrust faulting. If the angle of subduction steepens or rolls back, the upper plate lithosphere will be put in tension instead, often producing a back-arc basin.

=== Deep structure ===
The arc-trench complex is the surface expression of a much deeper structure. Though not directly accessible, the deeper portions can be studied using geophysics and geochemistry. Subduction zones are defined by an inclined zone of earthquakes, the Wadati–Benioff zone, that dips away from the trench and extends down below the volcanic arc to the 660-kilometer discontinuity. Subduction zone earthquakes occur at greater depths (up to 600 km (370 mi)) than elsewhere on Earth (typically less than 20 km (12 mi) depth); such deep earthquakes may be driven by deep phase transformations, thermal runaway, or dehydration embrittlement. Seismic tomography shows that some slabs can penetrate the lower mantle and sink clear to the core–mantle boundary. Here the residue of the slabs may eventually heat enough to rise back to the surface as mantle plumes.

=== Subduction angle ===
Subduction typically occurs at a moderately steep angle by the time it is beneath the volcanic arc. However, anomalous shallower angles of subduction are known to exist as well as some that are extremely steep.

- Flat slab subduction (subduction angle less than 30°) occurs when the slab subducts nearly horizontally. The relatively flat slab can extend for hundreds of kilometers under the upper plate. This geometry is commonly caused by the subduction of buoyant lithosphere due to thickened crust or warmer lithosphere. Recent studies have also shown a strong correlation that older and wider subduction zones are related to flatter subduction dips. This provides an explanation as to why flat subduction only presently occurs in the eastern pacific as only these regions were old and wide enough to support flat slab subduction and why the Laramide flat slab subduction and South China flat slab subduction were possible. Hu ultimately proposes that a combination of subduction age and slab characteristics provide the strongest controls over subduction dips. Because subduction of slabs to depth is necessary to drive subduction zone volcanism, flat-slab subduction can be invoked to explain volcanic gaps.

Flat-slab subduction is ongoing beneath part of the Andes, causing segmentation of the Andean Volcanic Belt into four zones. The flat-slab subduction in northern Peru and the Norte Chico region of Chile is believed to be the result of the subduction of two buoyant aseismic ridges, the Nazca Ridge and the Juan Fernández Ridge, respectively. Around Taitao Peninsula flat-slab subduction is attributed to the subduction of the Chile Rise, a spreading ridge.

The Laramide Orogeny in the Rocky Mountains of the United States is attributed to flat-slab subduction. During this orogeny, a broad volcanic gap appeared at the southwestern margin of North America, and deformation occurred much farther inland; it was during this time that the basement-cored mountain ranges of Colorado, Utah, Wyoming, South Dakota, and New Mexico came into being. The most massive subduction zone earthquakes, so-called "megaquakes", have been found to occur in flat-slab subduction zones.

- Steep-angle subduction (subduction angle greater than 70°) occurs in subduction zones where Earth's oceanic crust and lithosphere are cold and thick and have, therefore, lost buoyancy. Recent studies have also correlated steep angled subduction zones with younger and less extensive subduction zones. This would explain why most modern subduction zones are relatively steep. The steepest dipping subduction zone lies in the Mariana Trench, which is also where the oceanic lithosphere of Jurassic age is the oldest on Earth exempting ophiolites. Steep-angle subduction is, in contrast to flat-slab subduction, associated with back-arc extension of the upper plate, creating volcanic arcs and pulling fragments of continental crust away from continents to leave behind a marginal sea.

== Life cycle of subduction zones ==
=== Initiation of subduction ===
Although stable subduction is fairly well understood, the process by which subduction is initiated remains a matter of discussion and continuing study. Subduction can begin spontaneously if the denser oceanic lithosphere can founder and sink beneath the adjacent oceanic or continental lithosphere through vertical forcing only; alternatively, existing plate motions can induce new subduction zones by horizontally forcing the oceanic lithosphere to rupture and sink into the asthenosphere. Both models can eventually yield self-sustaining subduction zones, as the oceanic crust is metamorphosed at great depth and becomes denser than the surrounding mantle rocks. The compilation of subduction zone initiation events back to 100 Ma suggests horizontally-forced subduction zone initiation for most modern subduction zones, which is supported by results from numerical models and geologic studies. Some analogue modeling shows, however, the possibility of spontaneous subduction from inherent density differences between two plates at specific locations like passive margins and along transform faults. There is evidence this has taken place in the Izu-Bonin-Mariana subduction system. Earlier in Earth's history, subduction is likely to have initiated without horizontal forcing due to the lack of relative plate motion, though a proposal by A. Yin suggests that meteorite impacts may have contributed to subduction initiation on early Earth.

Though the idea of subduction initiation at passive margins is popular, there is no modern day example for this type of subduction nucleation. This is likely due to the strength of the oceanic or transitional crust at the continental passive margins, suggesting that if the crust did not break in its first 20 million years of life, it is unlikely to break in the future under normal sedimentation loads. Only with additional weaking of the crust, through hotspot magmatism or extensional rifting, would the crust be able to break from its continent and begin subduction.

=== End of subduction ===
Subduction can continue as long as the oceanic lithosphere moves into the subduction zone. However, the arrival of buoyant continental lithosphere at a subduction zone can result in increased coupling at the trench and cause plate boundary reorganization. The arrival of continental crust results in continental collision or terrane accretion that may disrupt subduction. Continental crust can subduct to depths of 250 km (160 mi) where it can reach a point of no return. Sections of crustal or intraoceanic arc crust greater than 15 km (9.3 mi) in thickness or oceanic plateau greater than 30 km (19 mi) in thickness can disrupt subduction. However, island arcs subducted end-on may cause only local disruption, while an arc arriving parallel to the zone can shut it down. This has happened with the Ontong Java Plateau and the Vitiaz Trench.

== Characteristics and effects ==
=== Metamorphism ===
Subduction zones host a unique variety of rock types created by the high-pressure, low-temperature conditions a subducting slab encounters during its descent. The metamorphic conditions the slab passes through in this process create and destroy water bearing (hydrous) mineral phases, releasing water into the mantle. This water lowers the melting point of mantle rock, initiating melting. Understanding the timing and conditions in which these dehydration reactions occur is key to interpreting mantle melting, volcanic arc magmatism, and the formation of continental crust.

A metamorphic facies is characterized by a stable mineral assemblage specific to a pressure-temperature range and specific starting material. Subduction zone metamorphism is characterized by a low temperature, high-ultrahigh pressure metamorphic path through the zeolite, prehnite-pumpellyite, blueschist, and eclogite facies stability zones of subducted oceanic crust. Zeolite and prehnite-pumpellyite facies assemblages may or may not be present, thus the onset of metamorphism may only be marked by blueschist facies conditions. The temperature and pressure conditions in some subduction zones deviate from the common low-temperature, high-ultrahigh pressure path, showing a very "warm" path (high temperature compared to pressure) at shallow depth below 45 km, and a switch to "cold" conditions (low temperature compared to pressure) at great depth above 90 km.

Subducting slabs are composed of basaltic crust topped with pelagic sediments; however, the pelagic sediments may be accreted onto the forearc-hanging wall and not subducted. Most metamorphic phase transitions that occur within the subducting slab are prompted by the dehydration of hydrous mineral phases. The breakdown of hydrous mineral phases typically occurs at depths greater than 10 km (6.2 mi). Each of these metamorphic facies is marked by the presence of a specific stable mineral assemblage, recording the metamorphic conditions undergone but the subducting slab. Transitions between facies cause hydrous minerals to dehydrate at certain pressure-temperature conditions and can therefore be tracked to melting events in the mantle beneath a volcanic arc.

=== Arc magmatism ===
Two kinds of arcs are generally observed on Earth: island arcs that form on the oceanic lithosphere (for example, the Mariana and the Tonga island arcs), and continental arcs such as the Cascade Volcanic Arc, that form along the coast of continents. Island arcs (intraoceanic or primitive arcs) are produced by the subduction of oceanic lithosphere beneath another oceanic lithosphere (ocean-ocean subduction) while continental arcs (Andean arcs) form during the subduction of oceanic lithosphere beneath a continental lithosphere (ocean-continent subduction). An example of a volcanic arc having both island and continental arc sections is found behind the Aleutian Trench subduction zone in Alaska.

Volcanoes that occur above subduction zones, such as Mount St. Helens, Mount Etna, and Mount Fuji, lie approximately one hundred kilometers from the trench in arcuate chains called volcanic arcs. Plutons, like Half Dome in Yosemite National Park, generally form 10–50 km (6–31 mi) below the volcanoes within the volcanic arcs and are only visible on the surface once the volcanoes have weathered away. The volcanism and plutonism occur as a consequence of the subducting oceanic slab dehydrating as it reaches higher pressures and temperatures. Once the oceanic slab reaches about 100 km (62 mi) in depth, hydrous minerals become unstable and release fluids into the asthenosphere. The fluids act as a flux for the rock within the asthenosphere and cause it to partially melt. The partially melted material is more buoyant and as a result will rise into the lithosphere, where it forms large magma chambers called diapirs. Some of the magma will make it to the surface of the crust where it will form volcanoes and, if eruptive on earth's surface, will produce andesitic lava. Magma that remains in the lithosphere long enough will cool and form plutonic rocks such as diorite, granodiorite, and sometimes granite.

The arc magmatism occurs one hundred to two hundred kilometers from the trench and approximately one hundred kilometers above the subducting slab. Arcs produce about 10% of the total volume of magma produced each year on Earth (approximately 0.75 cubic kilometers), much less than the volume produced at mid-ocean ridges, but they have formed most continental crust. Arc volcanism has the greatest impact on humans because many arc volcanoes lie above sea level and erupt violently. Aerosols injected into the stratosphere during violent eruptions can cause rapid cooling of Earth's climate and affect air travel.

Arc-magmatism plays a role in Earth's carbon cycle by releasing subducted carbon through volcanic processes. Older theory states that the carbon from the subducting plate is made available in overlying magmatic systems via decarbonation, where CO_{2} is released through silicate-carbonate metamorphism. However, evidence from thermodynamic modeling has shown that the pressures and temperatures necessary for this type of metamorphism are much higher than what is observed in most subduction zones. Frezzoti et al. (2011) propose a different mechanism for carbon transport into the overriding plate via dissolution (release of carbon from carbon-bearing minerals into an aqueous solution) instead of decarbonation. Their evidence comes from the close examination of mineral and fluid inclusions in low-temperature (<600 °C) diamonds and garnets found in an eclogite facies in the Alps. The chemistry of the inclusions supports the existence of a carbon-rich fluid in that environment, and additional chemical measurements of lower pressure and temperature facies in the same tectonic complex support a model for carbon dissolution (rather than decarbonation) as a means of carbon transport.

=== Earthquakes and tsunamis ===
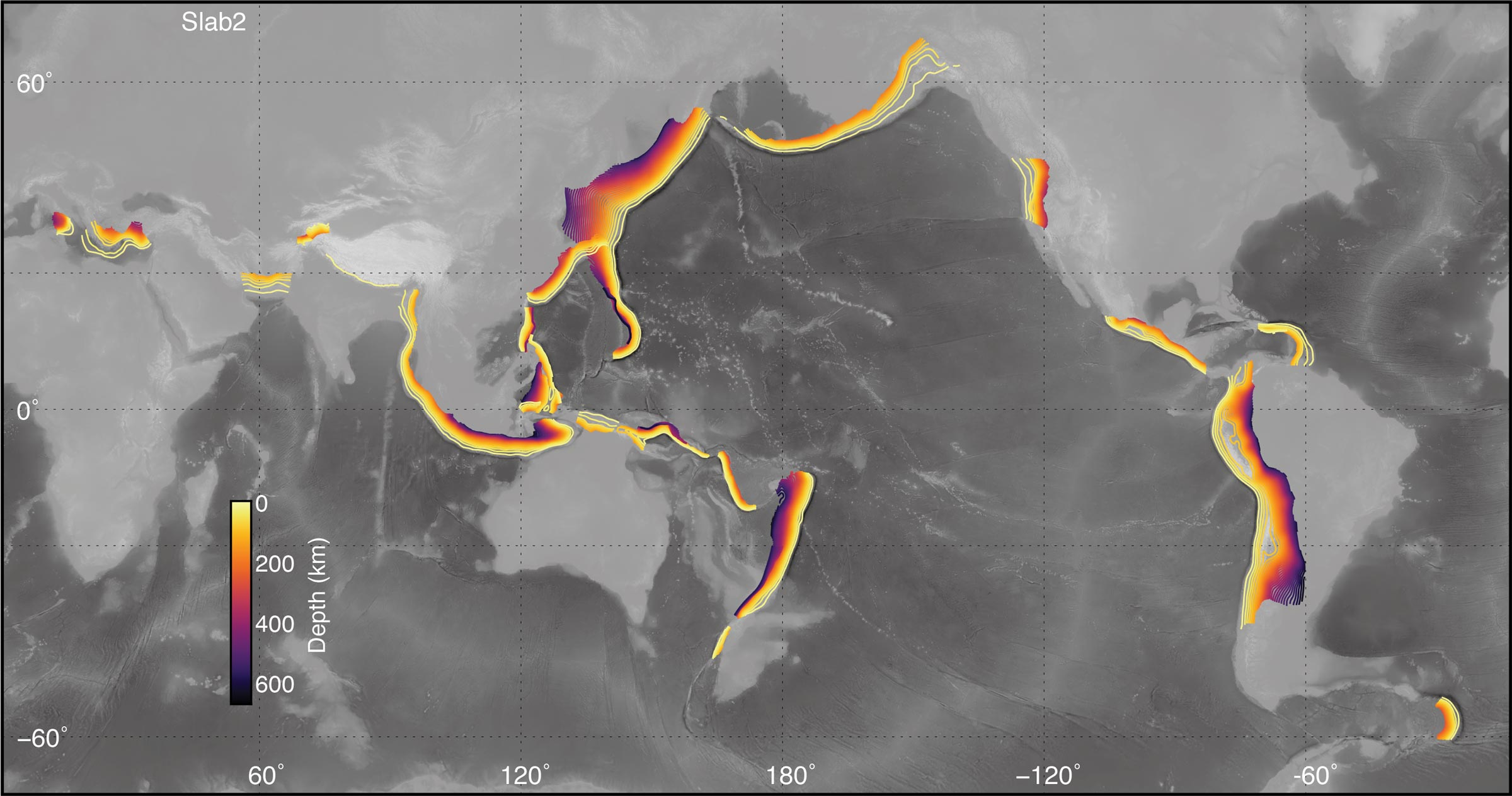
Global map of subduction zones, with subducted slabs contoured by depth

Elastic strain caused by plate convergence in subduction zones produces at least three types of earthquakes. These are deep earthquakes, megathrust earthquakes, and outer rise earthquakes. Deep earthquakes happen within the crust, megathrust earthquakes on the subduction interface near the trench, and outer rise earthquakes on the subducting lower plate as it bends near the trench.

Anomalously deep events are a characteristic of subduction zones, which produce the deepest quakes on the planet. Earthquakes are generally restricted to the shallow, brittle parts of the crust, generally at depths of less than twenty kilometers. However, in subduction zones quakes occur at depths as great as 700 km (430 mi). These quakes define inclined zones of seismicity known as Wadati–Benioff zones which trace the descending slab.

Nine of the ten largest earthquakes of the last 100 years were subduction zone megathrust earthquakes. These included the 1960 Great Chilean earthquake which at M 9.5 was the largest earthquake ever recorded, the 2004 Indian Ocean earthquake and tsunami, and the 2011 Tōhoku earthquake and tsunami. The subduction of cold oceanic lithosphere into the mantle depresses the local geothermal gradient and causes a larger portion of Earth's crust to deform in a more brittle fashion than it would in a normal geothermal gradient setting. Because earthquakes can occur only when a rock is deforming in a brittle fashion, subduction zones can cause large earthquakes. If such a quake causes rapid deformation of the sea floor, there is potential for tsunamis. The largest earthquake generated tsunami ever recorded happened due to a mega-thrust earthquake on December 26, 2004. The earthquake was caused by subduction of the Indo-Australian plate under the Eurasian plate, but the tsunami spread over most of the planet and devastated the areas around the Indian Ocean. Small tremors which cause small, nondamaging tsunamis, also occur frequently.

A study published in 2016 suggested a new parameter to determine a subduction zone's ability to generate mega-earthquakes. By examining subduction zone geometry and comparing the degree of lower plate curvature of the subducting plate in great historical earthquakes such as the 2004 Sumatra-Andaman and the 2011 Tōhoku earthquake, it was determined that the magnitude of earthquakes in subduction zones is inversely proportional to the angle of subduction near the trench, meaning that "the flatter the contact between the two plates, the more likely it is that mega-earthquakes will occur".

Outer rise earthquakes on the lower plate occur when normal faults oceanward of the subduction zone are activated by flexure of the plate as it bends into the subduction zone. The 2009 Samoa earthquake is an example of this type of event. Displacement of the sea floor caused by this event generated a six-meter tsunami in nearby Samoa.

Seismic tomography has helped detect subducted lithospheric slabs deep in the mantle where no earthquakes occur. About one hundred slabs have been described in terms of depth and their timing and location of subduction. The great seismic discontinuities in the mantle, at 410 km (250 mi) depth and 670 km (420 mi), are disrupted by the descent of cold slabs in deep subduction zones. Some subducted slabs seem to have difficulty penetrating the major discontinuity that marks the boundary between the upper mantle and lower mantle at a depth of about 670 km (420 mi). Other subducted oceanic plates have sunk to the core–mantle boundary at 2,890 km (1,800 mi) depth. Generally, slabs decelerate during their descent into the mantle, from typically several cm/yr (up to ~10 cm/yr in some cases) at the subduction zone and in the uppermost mantle, to ~1 cm/yr in the lower mantle. This leads to either folding or stacking of slabs at those depths, visible as thickened slabs in seismic tomography. Below ~1700 km, there might be a limited acceleration of slabs due to lower viscosity as a result of inferred mineral phase changes until they approach and finally stall at the core–mantle boundary. Here the slabs are heated up by the ambient heat and are not detected anymore ~300 Myr after subduction.

=== Orogeny ===
Orogeny is the process of mountain building. Subducting plates can lead to orogeny by bringing oceanic islands, oceanic plateaus, sediments and passive continental margins to convergent margins. The material often does not subduct with the rest of the plate but instead is accreted to (scraped off) the continent, resulting in exotic terranes. The collision of this oceanic material causes crustal thickening and mountain-building. The accreted material is often referred to as an accretionary wedge or prism. These accretionary wedges can be associated with ophiolites (uplifted ocean crust consisting of sediments, pillow basalts, sheeted dykes, gabbro, and peridotite).

Subduction may also cause orogeny without bringing in oceanic material that accretes to the overriding continent. When the lower plate subducts at a shallow angle underneath a continent (something called "flat-slab subduction"), the subducting plate may have enough traction on the bottom of the continental plate to cause the upper plate to contract by folding, faulting, crustal thickening, and mountain building. Flat-slab subduction causes mountain building and volcanism moving into the continent, away from the trench, and has been described in western North America (i.e. Laramide orogeny, and currently in Alaska, South America, and East Asia.

The processes described above allow subduction to continue while mountain building happens concurrently, which is in contrast to continent-continent collision orogeny, which often leads to the termination of subduction.

=== Subduction of continental lithosphere ===
Continents are pulled into subduction zones by the sinking oceanic plate they are attached to. Where continents are attached to oceanic plates with no subduction, there is a deep basin that accumulates thick suites of sedimentary and volcanic rocks known as a passive margin. Some passive margins have up to 10 km (6.2 mi) of sedimentary and volcanic rocks covering the continental crust. As a passive margin is pulled into a subduction zone by the attached and negatively buoyant oceanic lithosphere, the sedimentary and volcanic cover is mostly scraped off to form an orogenic wedge. An orogenic wedge is larger than most accretionary wedges due to the volume of material there is to accrete. The continental basement rocks beneath the weak cover suites are strong and mostly cold, and can be underlain by a >200 km thick layer of dense mantle. After shedding the low density cover units, the continental plate, especially if it is old, goes down the subduction zone. As this happens, metamorphic reactions increase the density of the continental crustal rocks, which leads to less buoyancy.

One study of the active Banda arc-continent collision claims that by unstacking the layers of rock that once covered the continental basement, but are now thrust over one another in the orogenic wedge, and measuring how long they are, can provide a minimum estimate of how far the continent has subducted. The results show at least a minimum of 229 km (142 mi) of subduction of the northern Australian continental plate. Another example may be the continued northward motion of India, which is subducting beneath Asia. The collision between the two continents initiated around 50 my ago, but is still active.

=== Intra-oceanic: ocean/ocean plate subduction ===
Oceanic-Oceanic plate subduction zones comprise roughly 40% of all subduction zone margins on the planet. The ocean-ocean plate relationship can lead to subduction zones between oceanic and continental plates, therefore highlighting how important it is to understand this subduction setting. Although it is not fully understood what causes the initiation of subduction of an oceanic plate under another oceanic plate, there are three main models put forth by Baitsch-Ghirardello et al. that explain the different regimes present in this setting.

The models are as follows:

1. retreating subduction: caused by weak coupling between the lower and upper plate which leads to the opening of a back arc basin and the subduction zone being moved by slab rollback.
2. stable subduction: caused by intermediate coupling between the lower and upper plate. The subduction zone generally stays in the same place and the subduction plate subducts at a consistent angle.
3. advancing subduction: caused by strong coupling between the upper and lower plate. The subducting sediments thicken causing partially molten plumes to be on top of subducting plate.

=== Arc-continent collision and global climate ===
In their 2019 study, Macdonald et al. proposed that arc-continent collision zones and the subsequent obduction of oceanic lithosphere was at least partially responsible for controlling global climate. Their model relies on arc-continent collision in tropical zones, where exposed ophiolites composed mainly of mafic material increase "global weatherability" and result in the storage of carbon through silicate weathering processes. This storage represents a carbon sink, removing carbon from the atmosphere and resulting in global cooling. Their study correlates several Phanerozoic ophiolite complexes, including active arc-continent subduction, with known global cooling and glaciation periods. This study does not discuss Milankovitch cycles as a driver of global climate cyclicity.

== Beginnings of subduction on Earth ==
Modern-style subduction is characterized by low geothermal gradients and the associated formation of high-pressure low-temperature rocks such as eclogite and blueschist. Likewise, rock assemblages called ophiolites, associated with modern-style subduction, also indicate such conditions. Eclogite xenoliths found in the North China Craton provide evidence that modern-style subduction occurred at least as early as 1.8 Ga ago in the Paleoproterozoic Era. The eclogite itself was produced by oceanic subduction during the assembly of supercontinents at about 1.9–2.0 Ga.

Blueschist is a rock typical for present-day subduction settings. The absence of blueschist older than Neoproterozoic reflects more magnesium-rich compositions of Earth's oceanic crust during that period. These more magnesium-rich rocks metamorphose into greenschist at conditions when modern oceanic crust rocks metamorphose into blueschist. The ancient magnesium-rich rocks mean that Earth's mantle was once hotter, but not that subduction conditions were hotter. Previously, the lack of pre-Neoproterozoic blueschist was thought to indicate a different type of subduction. Both lines of evidence refute previous conceptions of modern-style subduction having been initiated in the Neoproterozoic Era 1.0 Ga ago.

== History of investigation ==
Harry Hammond Hess, who during World War II served in the United States Navy Reserve and became fascinated with the ocean floor, studied the Mid-Atlantic Ridge, and proposed that hot molten rock was added to the crust at the ridge and expanded the seafloor outward. This theory was to become known as seafloor spreading. Since the Earth's circumference has not changed over geologic time, Hess concluded that older seafloor has to be consumed somewhere else, and suggested that this process takes place at oceanic trenches, where the crust would be melted and recycled into the Earth's mantle.

In 1964, George Plafker researched the Good Friday earthquake in Alaska. He concluded that the cause of the earthquake was a megathrust reaction in the Aleutian Trench, a result of the Alaskan continental crust overlapping the Pacific oceanic crust. This meant that the Pacific crust was being forced downward, or subducted, beneath the Alaskan crust. The concept of subduction would play a role in the development of the plate tectonics theory.

First geologic attestations of the "subduct" words date to 1970, In ordinary English to subduct, or to subduce (from Latin subducere, "to lead away") are transitive verbs requiring a subject to perform an action on an object not itself, here the lower plate, which has then been subducted ("removed"). The geological term is "consumed", which happens the geological moment the lower plate slips under, even though it may persist for some time until its remelting and dissipation. In this conceptual model, plate is continually being used up. The identity of the subject, the consumer, or agent of consumption, is left unstated. Some sources accept this subject-object construct.

Geology makes to subduct into an intransitive verb and a reflexive verb. The lower plate itself is the subject. It subducts, in the sense of retreat, or removes itself, and while doing so, is the "subducting plate". Moreover, the word slab is specifically attached to the "subducting plate", even though in English the upper plate is just as much of a slab. The upper plate is left hanging, so to speak. To express it geology must switch to a different verb, typically to override. The upper plate, the subject, performs the action of overriding the object, the lower plate, which is overridden.

== Importance ==
Subduction zones are important for several reasons:

- Subduction zone physics: Sinking of the oceanic lithosphere (sediments, crust, mantle), by the contrast of density between the cold and old lithosphere and the hot asthenospheric mantle wedge, is the strongest force (but not the only one) needed to drive plate motion and is the dominant mode of mantle convection.
- Subduction zone chemistry: The subducted sediments and crust dehydrate and release water-rich (aqueous) fluids into the overlying mantle, causing mantle melting and fractionation of elements between the surface and deep mantle reservoirs, producing island arcs and continental crust. Hot fluids in subduction zones also alter the mineral compositions of the subducting sediments and potentially the habitability of the sediments for microorganisms.
- Subduction zones drag down subducted oceanic sediments, oceanic crust, and mantle lithosphere that interact with the hot asthenospheric mantle from the over-riding plate to produce calc-alkaline series melts, ore deposits, and continental crust.
- Subduction zones pose significant threats to lives, property, economic vitality, cultural and natural resources, and quality of life. The tremendous magnitudes of earthquakes and volcanic eruptions can also have knock-on effects with global impact.

Subduction zones have also been considered as possible disposal sites for nuclear waste in which the action of subduction itself would carry the material into the planetary mantle, safely away from any possible influence on humanity or the surface environment. However, that method of disposal is currently banned by international agreement. Furthermore, plate subduction zones are associated with very large megathrust earthquakes, making the effects of using any specific site for disposal unpredictable and possibly adverse to the safety of long-term disposal.

== See also ==
- Compaction simulation
- Divergent boundary – Linear feature between two tectonic plates
- Divergent double subduction – Type of plate tectonic process
- List of tectonic plate interactions#Convergent boundaries (subduction zones) – Types of plate boundaries
- Obduction – Geological process at tectonic plate boundaries
- Paired metamorphic belts – Parallel linear rock units
- Ring of Fire – Tectonic belt of earthquakes and volcanoes
- Slab window – Type of gap in a subducted oceanic plate
- Wilson Cycle – Geophysical model of the opening and closing of rifts

== Additional reading ==
- Stern, R.J. (1998). "A Subduction Primer for Instructors of Introductory Geology Courses and Authors of Introductory Geology Textbooks". Journal of Geoscience Education. 46 (3): 221–228. Bibcode:1998JGeEd..46..221S. doi:10.5408/1089-9995-46.3.221.
- Tatsumi, Y. (2005). "The Subduction Factory: How it operates on Earth". GSA Today. 15 (7): 4–10. doi:10.1130/1052-5173(2005)015[4:TSFHIO]2.0.CO;2.
