= Juan Fernández Ridge =

Volcanic island and seamount chain on the Nazca plate

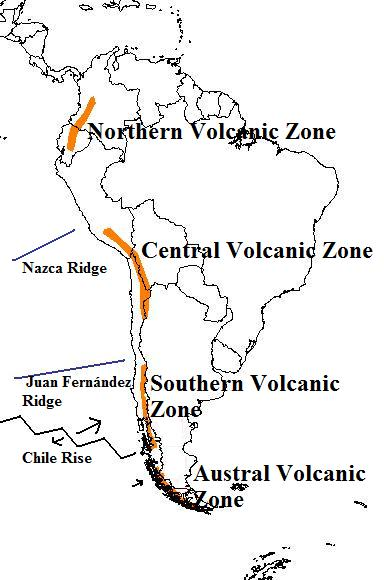
Map of the volcanic arcs in the Andes and subducted structures affecting volcanism.

The Juan Fernández Ridge is a volcanic island and seamount chain on the Nazca plate. It runs for about 800 km (500 mi) in a west–east direction from the Juan Fernández hotspot to the Peru–Chile Trench between the latitudes of 32-34° S before subducting beneath the South American plate near Valparaíso. The ridge forms a deep underwater corridor about 3,900 m (12,800 ft) below sea level, and was formed by upwelling of hot material from deep underground more than 22 million years ago. The ridge affects the geology of the region, and causes volcanic activity and earthquakes.

== Location ==
Juan Fernández Ridge is a chain of volcanic islands and seamounts on the Nazca plate. It runs for about 800 km (500 mi) in a west–east direction from the Juan Fernández hotspot to the Peru–Chile Trench between the latitudes of 32-34° S before subducting beneath the South American plate near Valparaíso.

== Geology ==
The ridge was formed by upwelling of a deep plume of hot material from the mantle of the Earth. The ridge forms a deep underwater corridor about 3,900 m (12,800 ft) below sea level, and is made up of four island groups, with multiple summits. The ocean floor around the ridge is estimated to be 22 to 37 million years old.

The Juan Fernández Ridge which normally runs east-west, bends northeast near the O'Higgins seamounts. This results in the ridge subducting against the southern edge of the Valparaíso Basin, resulting in pushing the continental plate. The ridge acts like a wall trapping sediments behind it. On the upper side, the slope is worn away, while building up sediments further south, where the ridge has not worn yet. These surface changes influence volcanic activity in the region and might be connected to earlier tectonic events that helped shape the Andes mountains.

Earthquake data from seismic studies have resulted in the discovery of a double seismic zone inside the subducting Nazca Plate. The lower layer of earthquakes happens about 20–25 km (12–16 mi) below the upper layer, which starts about 50 km (31 mi) from the surface to meet the lower layer at a depth of 120 km (75 mi). The stress is caused mainly by the collision of tectonic plates and the thickness of the continental crust. In the upper layers, it is squeezed horizontally, while in the lower layers, it is being stretched in the same direction as the plate movement due to the weight of the crust above it. The cold temperature and water released from minerals deep in the earth helps weaken the rock and allows earthquakes to happen, while the stress direction controls how those earthquakes rupture.
