= Department of Civil and Environmental Engineering, Imperial College London =

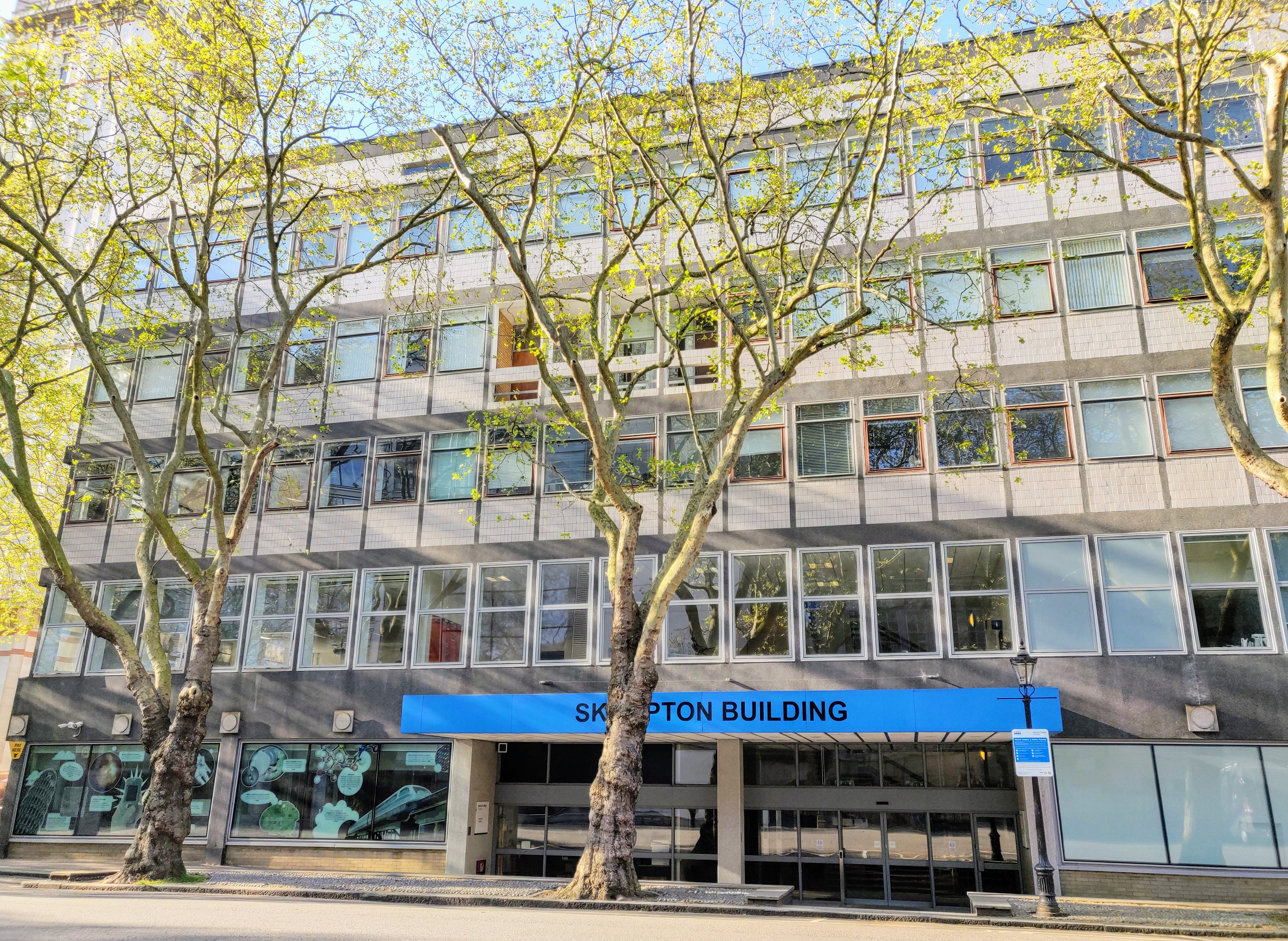
- Skempton Building, Imperial College Road
- Established: 1913; 113 years ago
- Head of Department: Professor Washington Yotto Ochieng
- Faculty: Imperial College Faculty of Engineering
- Students: 778
- Location: Imperial College Road, London, United Kingdom; 51.498389°N 0.175806°W
- Campus: South Kensington
- Website: www.imperial.ac.uk/civil-engineering

Map
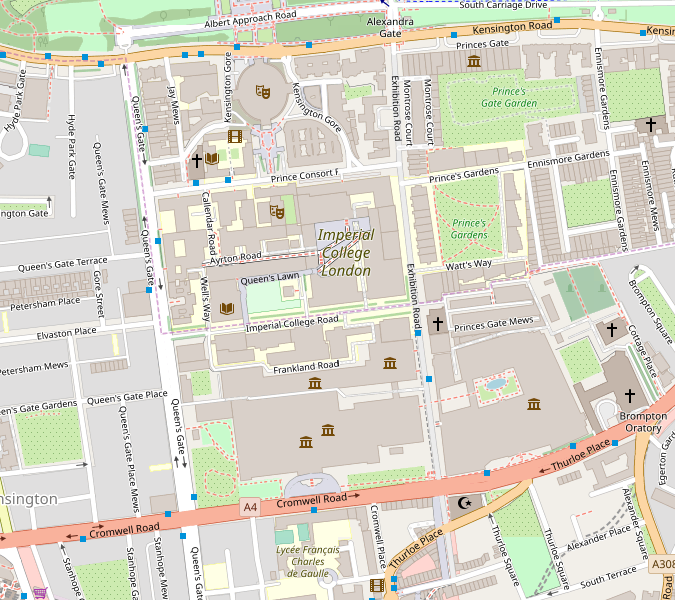
- Location within Albertopolis, South Kensington

The Department of Civil and Environmental Engineering is an academic department of the Faculty of Engineering at Imperial College London in England, United Kingdom.

It is located at the South Kensington Campus in London, along Imperial College Road. The department is currently a part of the college's Faculty of Engineering, which was formed in 2001 when Imperial College restructured.

The department is housed in the Skempton Building, named after the English civil engineer Sir Alec Skempton, the former head of the department. The departmental building changed its name from Civil Engineering Building to its current name in 2004, a short time after Skempton's death in 2001.

== History ==
In 1884 the Central Institution of the City & Guilds of London Institute, later the City & Guilds College, appointed a professor, William Unwin, to teach civil and mechanical Engineering, the first teaching in the subject at the predecessors to Imperial College. In 1904, the department was taken over by William Dalby, who held the position until a separate civil engineering department was formed.

From 1913 when the Department of Civil Engineering was separated, the Heads were:

- 1913–1933: Stephen M. Dixon – (Railways and Bridges)
- 1933–1956: Alfred Pippard – (Structural Analysis and Aeronautical Structures)
- 1957–1976: Sir Alec Skempton – (Soil Mechanics)
- 1976–1982: Bernard George Neal – (Engineering Structures)
- 1982–1985: John Ian Munro – (Civil Engineering Systems)
- 1986–1994: Patrick J. Dowling – (Structural Engineering)
- 1994–1997: Roger E. Hobbs – (Structural Engineering)
- 1997–1999: Tony M. Ridley – (Transport)
- 1999–2011: David A. Nethercot – (Structural Engineering)
- 2011–2021: Nick Buenfeld – (Concrete Structures)
- 2021–Now: Washington Yotto Ochieng – (Transport)

== Academics ==
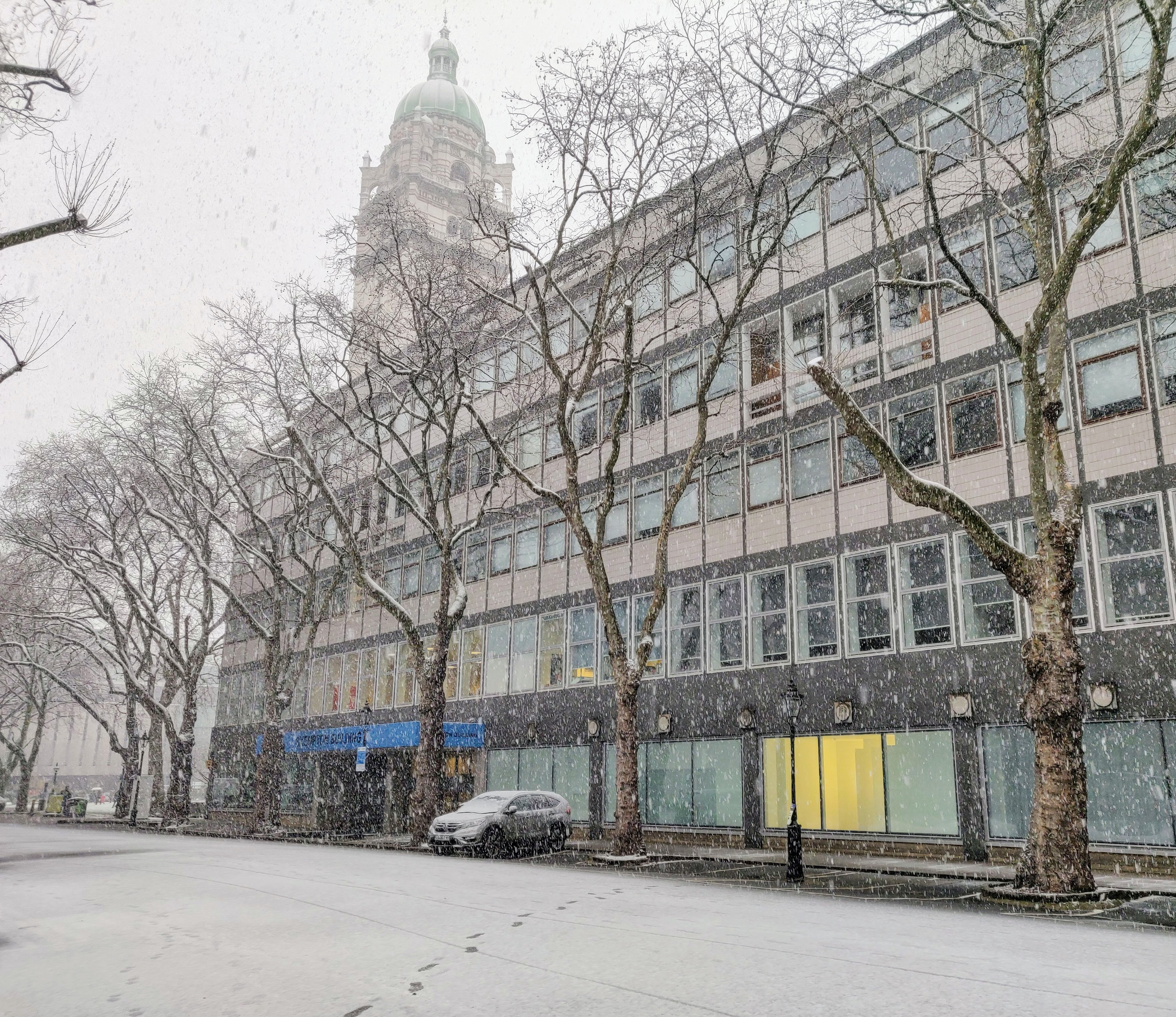
Skempton Building in snow

The department currently consists of 6 main Sections:

- Environmental & Water Resource Engineering
- Fluid Mechanics
- Geotechnics
- Transport
- Structural Engineering
- Materials

Each section has its own head and laboratories. Research carried out in the department covers experimental, analytical, computational and theoretical work. Additionally, field research is conducted, especially in the Environmental and Geotechnical Engineering sections. Each section is responsible for their postgraduate courses, taught and non-taught. The department also houses the Laing O'Rourke Centre for Systems Engineering and Innovation.

=== Rankings ===
The college ranked 10th in the world for engineering in the 2018 Times Higher Education subject rankings, and the department in particular ranked 3rd in the world, and 2nd in the UK after Cambridge, in the 2018 QS World University Rankings. Domestically, the department ranked 2nd on the Complete University Guide's 2019 civil engineering table, and 1st on The Guardian's 2019 civil engineering university subject rankings.

=== Study ===
The department offers both undergraduate and postgraduate level studies, as well as a number of short courses for practising engineers.

==== Undergraduate ====
The department offers an undergraduate Master of Engineering course which last four years. The department has study-abroad arrangements with universities in Europe, including ETH Zurich, TU-Delft, École des ponts ParisTech and ENSHM Grenoble, as well as in America, Australia and Hong Kong. All students graduating with the MEng degree are also awarded the Associateship of the City & Guilds Institute, ACGI.

==== Postgraduate ====
Taught postgraduate courses last for one year lead to a MSc. The department also offers research degrees, leading to either a PhD or EngD. The former are designed to last normally for 3–4 years whereas the latter are normally designed to last for 4 years. All students graduating with any of the postgraduate degrees (MSc, PhD or EngD) are also awarded the Diploma of Imperial College, DIC.

==== Short courses ====
The department also organises some short courses which involve modules from the taught Master's programme. These courses lead to a certificate of attendance, rather than a degree proper.

== Library ==
The department has a departmental library located on the fourth floor in the Skempton Building. It used to be part of the Imperial College Library, but from 2009 it is a part of the Institution of Civil Engineers (ICE) library. It covers mainly standard reference textbooks, academic journals, proceedings of conferences, geological maps, theses, electronic information resources and a collection of old historic books, some of which date back to the 19th century.

== Alumni ==
From the department's academics, two have been knighted, several others have received other classes of the Order of the British Empire, five people received the Institution of Structural Engineers Gold Medal, nine people delivered the British Geotechnical Association Rankine Lecture and several have been Fellows of the Royal Society and the Royal Academy of Engineering and have delivered the Geotechnique Lecture.

Several notable people have passed from it and some of them are (in alphabetical order):

- Nicholas Ambraseys, Geotechnical Engineer & Engineering Seismologist – Founder of Engineering Seismology at Imperial College London
- Louis Attrill, Civil Engineer – Olympic Rowing Gold Medalist
- Cecil Balmond, Structural Engineer – Founder of Arup's Advanced Geometry Unit
- Alan W. Bishop, Geotechnical Engineer – Founder of the Bishop's method of analysing soil slopes
- John Burland, Geotechnical Engineer – The person who stabilised the Tower of Pisa
- Stephen Glaister, Professor of Transport Economics
- Rudolph Glossop, Engineering Geologist
- Richard Jardine, Geomechanics
- Cyrus Mistry, Civil Engineer – Chairman-elect of Tata Group
- David Nethercot, Structural Engineer – Involved in the development of Eurocode 3
- Alfred Pippard, Structural Engineer
- Peter Rice, Structural Engineer
- Sarada K. Sarma, Geotechnical Engineer – Founder of the Sarma method of analysing the seismic stability of earth slopes and dams
- Sir Alec Skempton, Geotechnical Engineer – Founding father of Soil mechanics
- Peter Rolfe Vaughan, Geotechnical Engineer – Significant work on embankments and dams
- Chris Wise, Structural Engineer – Designer of the Millennium Bridge and founder of Expedition Engineering
- Peter Wolf, Civil Engineer, Hydrologist – Founding Professor and Head of Civil Engineering Department at City University London
- Olgierd Zienkiewicz, Civil Engineer – one of the pioneers of the Finite Element Method and its applications

=== Links ===
Past President of the Institution of Civil Engineers, (ICE) Paul Jowitt is an alumnus of the department. The previous Head, David A. Nethercot is a past President of the Institution of Structural Engineers (IStructE), whereas the current President of the Society for Earthquake and Civil Engineering Dynamics (SECED) is the Head of the Structural Engineering Section, Ahmed Elghazouli, who is also the UK's national delegate for international committees for Earthquake Engineering. The current Director of the RAC Foundation is the Department's Professor of Transport Economics, Stephen Glaister who is also Partnership Director of Tube Lines and has also been a board member of Transport for London (TfL). The current Head of the Civil & Environmental Engineering at Massachusetts Institute of Technology, (MIT), Andrew J. Whittle is also a graduate of the department.

The department collaborates with the outside academic and professional world through professional bodies and association. Examples are the British Geotechnical Association's Rankine Lecture which is hosted every March at Imperial College, the organisation of the Centre for Transport Studies (a collaboration between Imperial College and University College London), several seminars organised by the Institution of Structural Engineers (such as IStructE Gold Medal awards), and seminars organised by the Institution of Civil Engineers and its associated societies such as SECED.
