= Nicholas Ambraseys =

Greek seismologist (1929-2012)

Nicholas N. Ambraseys
- Born: 19 January 1929; Athens, Greece
- Died: December 28, 2012 (aged 83); England
- Citizenship: British, Greek
- Education: Imperial College London; National Technical University of Athens
- Known for: Historical Seismicity, Calculation of seismic displacements of dams
- Awards: 44th Rankine Lecture (2004); Legend of Earthquake Engineering
- Scientific career
- Fields: Engineering Seismology; Soil Mechanics
- Institutions: Imperial College London
- Thesis: The seismic stability of earth dams (1958)
- Doctoral advisor: Alec Skempton; Alan W. Bishop
- Doctoral students: Sarada K. Sarma

Nicholas Neocles Ambraseys (19 January 1929 – 28 December 2012) was a Greek engineering seismologist. He was emeritus professor of engineering seismology and senior research fellow at Imperial College London. For many years Ambraseys was considered the leading figure and an authority in earthquake engineering and seismology in Europe.

== Curriculum ==
Ambraseys studied rural and surveying engineering at the National Technical University of Athens (Diploma in 1952) and then civil engineering at Imperial College, specialising in soil mechanics and engineering seismology. He worked with Professors Alec Skempton and Alan W. Bishop and obtained his PhD degree in 1958; his thesis title was "The seismic stability of earth dams". He joined the staff in 1958 as a lecturer and he was appointed a reader in engineering seismology in 1968 and full professor of engineering seismology in 1974.

In 1968 he established the Engineering Seismology Section (ESEE) (now part of the Geotechnics Section) in the Department of Civil and Environmental Engineering of Imperial College and served as its first head from 1971 to 1994, until he retired and was reappointed as senior research investigator. He founded and became the first chairman of the British National Committee of Earthquake Engineering.

== Scientific work ==
His major research focused on engineering seismology and geotechnical earthquake engineering. He specialised in earthquake hazard assessment, the earthquake resistant design of geotechnical structures (dams and foundations) and strong-motion seismology; on which he published widely (more than 300 publications, of which several papers appeared in highly cited journals), provided consulting services and edited work of other colleagues in numerous journals. He was co-founder of the Journal of Earthquake Engineering and one of the early creators of the European Association for Earthquake Engineering. He is among the most widely cited authors in the diverse fields of civil engineering and earthquake engineering, and one of the most cited authors in the field of engineering seismology to which he is considered by many to be a founding father.

=== Seismic dam and slope stability ===
His doctoral work on the seismic stability of dams (1958) dealt, among other issues, with the prediction of permanent displacements in earth dams after earthquakes and formed the basis of what is today known as the Newmark's sliding block analysis method (1965). Newmark himself acknowledged Ambraseys' contribution to this method through "... the comments and suggestions... of his colleague for several months, while he was visiting the University of Illinois...". Moreover, Harry Bolton Seed, the founding father of the diverse academic field geotechnical earthquake engineering, in the 19th Rankine Lecture acknowledged the influence of Ambraseys, "... who introduced him to the problems of earthquakes and encouraged him to become involved in this new area pointing out the enormous field laboratory that existed in California..." Ambraseys' early work on the seismic stability of earth dams set the foundations of a new method of analysis which was later further developed by other researchers, the "shear beam" method; which was an early attempt to consider the dynamic behavior of an earth dam due to seismic wave propagation.

His early work on seismic stability of dams attracted the attention and inspired numerous young researchers in that field. The most notable example is his first PhD student Sarada K. Sarma whose research led to the development of the Sarma method of seismic slope stability. Extensions of that work and on the calculation of seismic displacements led to new developments regarding earthquake induced ground displacements.

Ambraseys had also in his early days researched in the aspect of theoretical ground response analysis. In fact, his pioneering work on the seismic response of dam was based on those early considerations of ground response and was their extension by considering the geometry of an earth dam as a truncated wedge.

=== Earthquake records and historical seismicity ===
He was extensively involved in the European Strong Motion Database project. He led a European effort to collect and process various strong motion data from the European region. Finally, a huge amount of data was published providing access to seismic researchers and practitioners in Europe.

Many people argue that Ambraseys's greatest contribution is in the field of historical seismicity. He personally searched, found and collected an enormous amount of information about earthquakes which existed in various libraries, manuscripts and other forms of written communication around the world. In 1985 he applied historical seismology to make an influential prediction about the maximum magnitude of earthquakes in the UK:

"The seismicity of the UK is clearly different from that of eastern USA or W Africa in that either (i) no earthquakes of M ≥ 6.0 occur or (ii) 700 years is not long enough to reveal such events in the UK, whereas 100 years is more than adequate in the eastern USA and W Africa ... Is there anywhere on the continents seismically quieter than the UK?"

His ability to speak fluently a number of languages allowed his direct involvement in the search for the original sources of earthquake information. Finally, he was in a good position to identify several erroneous information about earthquake events, and therefore he was able to develop new correct catalogues of earthquake history with updated and corrected information.

=== Other contributions ===
He also worked on hydrodynamics and investigated how to calculate hydrodynamic forces on various types of structures. Moreover, his contribution to tsunamis has been significant, and there is an intensity scale named after him (Sieberg-Ambraseys Tsunami Intensity Scale).

== Earthquake engineering educator ==
Ambraseys was one of the early academics who worked on Earthquake Engineering in Europe. In addition to his research activities, he established a strong academic training at Imperial College, with relevant modules both in the undergraduate and postgraduate curriculums. Regarding the latter, he introduced MSc courses in Earthquake Engineering, Structural Dynamics and Engineering Seismology which were very popular and attracted gifted students from around the world (e.g. Sarada K. Sarma). Through his engaging lectures Ambraseys inspired and educated generations of engineers and many of them are now eminent academics or practising engineers around the world.

== Recognition & awards ==
He was a fellow of the Royal Academy of Engineering, of the European Academy, of the Academy of Athens and the medallist of a number of UK and European learned societies. Ambraseys was invited in 1987 to deliver the first Mallet–Milne Lecture for the Society for Earthquake and Civil Engineering Dynamics (SECED), and in 2004 to deliver the 44th Rankine Lecture of the British Geotechnical Association, titled "Engineering, seismology and soil mechanics".

In 2005 Ambraseys received the Harry Fielding Reid Medal of the Seismological Society of America. This medal is the highest honor granted by the SSA and it is awarded no more than once a year for outstanding contributions in seismology and earthquake engineering. The list of previous recipients of this award includes Charles Richter and C. Allin Cornell.

The European Association for Earthquake Engineering has established the "Prof. Nicholas Ambraseys Distinguished Lecture Award" in recognition of Ambraseys's huge contribution in the field of Earthquake Engineering.

In the 14th World Conference in Earthquake Engineering that took place in Beijing in October 2008, he was voted as one of the 13 Legends of the Field – the only European on the list. Only five living persons received this rare distinction: (in alphabetical order) Nicholas Ambraseys, Ray W. Clough, George W. Housner, Thomas Paulay and Joseph Penzien.

In 2014, the Department of Civil Engineering at Imperial College, SECED and the British Geotechnical Association (BGA) organised a pre-Rankine seminar (an annual half-day seminar held at Imperial College before the prestigious Rankine Lecture) to honour and commemorate Professor Ambraseys's great contribution to the field of Earthquake Engineering, called "Nicholas Ambraseys Memorial Symposium". A special issue of the Bulletin of Earthquake Engineering, the official journal of the European Association for Earthquake Engineering, was published in 2014 in memory of Professor Ambraseys. An obituary written by two of Professor Ambraseys's former students (John Douglas and Sarada K. Sarma) was published in the soil mechanics journal Geotechnique in 2013.

== Books ==
- Ambraseys, N., Melville, C. (1982). A history of Persian earthquakes, Cambridge University Press.
- Ambraseys, N., Melville, C., Adams R. (1994) Seismicity of Egypt, Arabia and the Red Sea, Cambridge University Press.
- Ambraseys, N., Finkel C. (1995) The seismicity of Turkey, Eren Press.
- Ambraseys N., Sigbjörnsson R. (1999) Reappraisal of Seismicity of Iceland, Polytechnica Pub., Reykjavik.
- Ambraseys N., Adams R. (2000) The seismicity of Central America, Imperial College Press.
- Ambraseys N. (2009) Earthquakes in the eastern Mediterranean and the Middle East: a multidisciplinary study of seismicity up to 1900, Cambridge University Press. (ISBN 9780521872928)

== Bibliography ==
- Ambraseys N. N. (1958), The seismic stability of earth dams. PhD Thesis, Imperial College, University of London
- Harry Fielding Reid Medal Citation for Nicholas Ambraseys
- Bibliographic list of 320 articles and 7 books
