= M4 bus lane =

Former bus lane in London, England

Coordinates: 51.49257°N 0.3598°W

Interactive route map

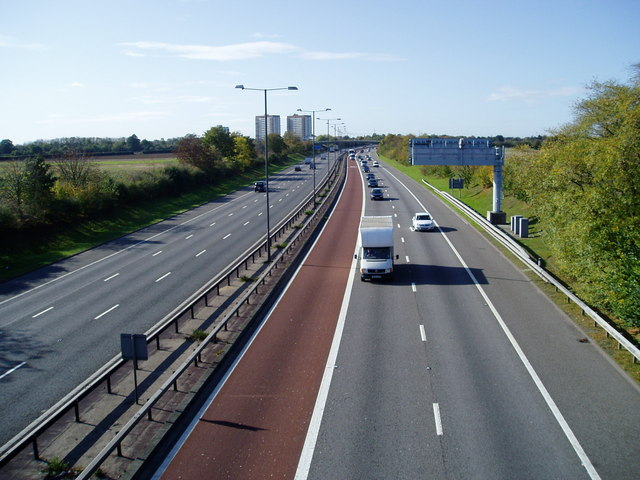
M4 bus lane near Norwood Green, Ealing

The M4 bus lane was a 3.5-mile (5.6 km) bus lane on the eastbound (London-bound) carriageway of the M4 motorway between Heathrow Airport and central London. It operated between junction 3 (A312) to the start of the elevated 2-lane section near Brentford. The lane, which had no intermediate junctions, was reserved for buses, coaches, motorbikes, emergency vehicles and licensed taxis (but not minicabs).

It was positioned in Lane 3 on the motorway, causing bus drivers to switch lanes between 1 mile and 500 yards before the lane started.

The lane opened as a pilot in June 1999 and was made permanent in 2001. It was suspended during December 2010 using an 18-month Experimental Traffic Order after which it was reinstated temporarily for the 2012 London Olympics. It has since been scrapped permanently.

== History ==
The M4 is mostly a 3-lane motorway, but between Junctions 2 and 3, it narrows down to 2 lanes and the hard shoulder disappears. As a result, the point where the 3 lanes narrowed to two lanes proved a significant bottleneck. The original intention was to replace the bottleneck with a lane drop at Junction 3, meaning that the road stretch between Junctions 2 and 3 would be narrowed to two lanes. The redundant tarmac was then converted into the bus lane

The lane, replacing the original offside lane (the lane nearest to the central reservation) of the motorway, was opened as a pilot by the then Deputy Prime Minister, John Prescott on 7 June 1999 and was made permanent in 2001. A speed limit of 50 mph was created when the bus lane opened, which was then raised to 60 mph in 2002 when motorcycles were also allowed to use the lane.

Research into the effect of the lane was undertaken by the Transport Research Laboratory in 2000 and 2003. (see below)

On 1 October 2010 it was reported that the transport secretary, Philip Hammond, was likely to announce at the Conservative Party conference that the lane would be suspended for 18 months from 24 December 2010 to be brought back for the 2012 Summer Olympics after which it would be scrapped.

During his speech to the Conservative Party conference Philip Hammond explained that removing the bus lane would result in 'shortening average journey times; reducing congestion; restoring a sense of fairness. Seven Freedom of information requests were made the following day to various organisations (see below).

A section of the bus lane was removed and the lane reverted to all-traffic use on 16 November 2010. By the end of December 2010 the entire lane had been removed and the full road width reverted to all-traffic use.

However, the 60 mph speed limit is still imposed on the stretch from junction 3.

== Research ==
A study by the Transport Research Laboratory 'Monitoring of the M4 bus lane: the first year' was produced in 2000 reported that the £1.9m scheme had reduced rush hour journey times by 3.5 minutes for buses and one minute for cars. Off-peak car journey times were a minute longer due to a reduced speed limit which was cut from 70 miles per hour (110 km/h) to 50 miles per hour (80 km/h) and overall journey times had increased by 1.8%. CO_{2} emissions were cut by 16%, fuel consumption had improved by 16% and that noise levels were down by one decibel.

Transport for London reported that the 7% of M4 traffic that used the bus lane carried 21% of the people.

TRL produced a further report in 2003 'Monitoring of the M4 bus lane: 2000 to 2002'.

A 2005 literature review of research into high-occupancy lanes produced for the Highways Agency reported that the lane was used about 3700 vehicles a day (3100 taxis, 500 buses or coaches and 100 minibuses) and that there was an overall benefit was 200 person-hours per weekday and a dis-benefit of 350 person-hours per weekend day; the dis-benefit being the result of the reduced speed-limit.

== Freedom of information requests ==
A number of freedom of information requests have been made in relation to the M4 bus lane:

- 14 August 2009—Highways Agency which revealed that a total of 20 Penalty Charge Notices had been issued since January 2008 for misuse of the bus lane.
- 29 October 2009 Public Carriage Office which revealed that 192 complaints had been made about private hire vehicles using the bus lane.
- 2 October 2010—Seven FOI requests were received by agencies following the announcement that the lane was to be removed:
  - Highways Agency (two requests), the first requested details of data held relating to the operation of the bus lane, in particular reports produced by the Transport Research Laboratory and around the decision to remove the lane. The Response was delayed with the reason given as "The complexity and volume of the requested information and the current position surrounding the issues of the M4 bus lane mean that it is impracticable for us to give a full response within the original 20 days". The second requested details of the changes, communications relating to the changes and analysis.
  - Department for Transport requesting details of data held and correspondence relating to the bus lane. No response had been received by 13 November 2010.
  - Transport for London who responded saying that they had not been part of any discussion.
  - Borough Councils traversed by the bus lane Hillingdon Borough Council, Ealing Borough Council, and Hounslow Borough Council responded saying that they had not been part of any discussion.
- 13 October 2010—Prime Minister's Office requesting details of correspondence regarding the removal of the M4 Bus Lane. The response was that no information was held by that office.

== Controversy ==
The lane has been controversial since it was first introduced; In 2001 the Automobile Association suggested that it could only be deemed a success if 'significant numbers of drivers switched from their cars to public transport' and Jeremy Clarkson of Top Gear said he would 'vote for anyone who promised to tear up that stupid pinko bus lane'. When John Prescott appeared as a guest on Top Gear on 27 February 2011, the bus lane was the first topic raised by Clarkson. Citing independent research, Prescott maintained that reducing the motorway to two general lanes, had improved traffic flow and raised the average speed and lowered journey times for all users, while also improving safety. Countering this theory, Clarkson asked why the government had agreed to widen other motorways, which Prescott justified on the rise in number of cars on the roads (7 million new cars).

In 2009 The AA described it as an underused white elephant. When announcing the suspension of the scheme in 2010 Philip Hammond said that 'Nothing is more symbolic of Labour's war on the motorist', the RAC Foundation supported the move with director Stephen Glaister commenting that 'Most drivers on the M4 will wonder why this decision has taken so long'. A Freedom of Information request in 2009 revealed that the bus lane was barely enforced, with only 20 fixed penalty notices being issued in the preceding 18 months and that private drivers were able to get away with regularly driving in it.
