= Newmark =

Newmark is a surname. Notable people with the surname include:

- Andy Newmark, American musician
- Bobby Newmark, fictional character in novel
- Brooks Newmark (born 1958), British politician, Member of Parliament for Braintree
- Craig Newmark, founder of Craigslist
- Dave Newmark, former basketball player
- Harris Newmark, former businessman and historian
- Joseph Newmark (1799–1881), Prussian-born American rabbi.
- Nathan M. Newmark, structural engineer
- Peter Newmark (1916–2011), an English professor of translation

== See also ==
- Newmark-beta method, numerical integration method
- Newmark Group, a commercial real estate company
- Newmark's influence chart, method of showing soil pressure
- Newmark's sliding block, a calculation method in engineering
- Newmark Theatre in Portland, Oregon
- CUNY Newmark Journalism School in New York, NY
- Newmark Ground Water Contamination Site in San Bernardino, California
