= Emily So =

Civil engineer

Emily Kwok Mei So
- Education: Imperial College London; University of Cambridge
- Scientific career
- Workplaces: United States Geological Survey; University of Cambridge; Arup Group
- Thesis: The assessment of casualties for earthquake loss estimation (2009)

Emily So is a British civil engineer who is professor of Architectural Engineering and Head of the Cambridge University Department of Architecture. Her research considers the seismic resilience of buildings. So worked on the 2017 World Building of the Year.

== Early life and education ==
So studied civil engineering at Imperial College London. After graduating, So worked at Arup Group as a geotechnical engineer. She returned to academia in 2005, when she embarked on a PhD at the University of Cambridge. Her doctoral research developed strategies to assess for casualties during earthquakes.

== Research and career ==
In 2009, So joined the United States Geological Survey, where she worked as a Mendenhall Fellow and was responsible for assessing and managing urban risk. She has worked to improve seismic safety for communities impacted by earthquakes. In 2010 she was awarded the Shah Family Innovation Prize. She was part of the One University One Village (1U1V) team who designed the World Building of the Year in 2017, which incorporated traditional building methods to provide anti-seismic capabilities for people living in Yunnan. The area had endured the 2014 Ludian earthquake, which left hundreds of people dead and thousands of people homeless.

So is part of the Earthquake Engineering Field Investigation Team (EEFIT), a collaborative effort between the University of Cambridge. In 2023, she visited the Turkey–Syria earthquake zones to assess building damage and learn best practise for the response to future seismic disasters. The earthquake caused substantial damage to buildings, with costs of around $84 billion. Working alongside structural engineers from Turkey, So found the concrete from collapsed buildings had been bulked out with stones, which can compromise the strength of the concrete. They reported that reinforced concrete was responsible for the number of casualties.

She serves on the Scientific Advisory Group for Emergencies.

== Selected publications ==
- Emily So; Robin Spence (2012). "Estimating shaking-induced casualties and building damage for global earthquake events: a proposed modelling approach". Bulletin of Earthquake Engineering. 11 (1): 347–363. doi:10.1007/s10518-012-9373-8. Wikidata Q57865985.
- Stephen Platt; Emily So (2016). "Speed or deliberation: a comparison of post-disaster recovery in Japan, Turkey, and Chile". Disasters. 41 (4): 696–727. doi:10.1111/disa.12219. PMID 27982457. Wikidata Q39162627.
- Katsuichiro Goda; Grace Campbell; Laura Hulme; et al. (2016). "The 2016 Kumamoto Earthquakes: Cascading Geological Hazards and Compounding Risks". Frontiers in Built Environment. 2. doi:10.3389/fbuil.2016.00019. Wikidata Q57896053.
