= RAC 124 =

Stimulation drink

The RAC 124 was a stimulation drink with a lightly peach flavor, sold in a silver 250ml can. It was designed by the RAC Foundation and the makers of the drink Sprite to help get tired motorists home safely if they felt sleepy at the wheel. It was intended to give the drinker a 15-30 minute boost at most. It was sold in the early 2000s at garages and convenience stores only.

== Stats ==
Nutritional information per 100 ml (8 US fl. oz.) serving of RAC 124 Regular
	RAC 124
Calories	42 kj per 100 ml of fluid
Total Fat	N/A
Total Carbohydrates	N/A
Sugars	N/A
Protein	Trace
Caffeine	30 mg per 100 ml of fluid
Niacin (B_{3})	19 mg
Vitamin B_{6}	1.9 mg
Vitamin B_{12}	0.47 μg
Pantothenic acid	N/A
