= Sieberg =

Sieberg is a surname. Notable people with the surname include:

- August Heinrich Sieberg (1875-1945), German geophysicist
  - Mercalli-Cancani-Sieberg scale, for earthquakes
- Marcel Sieberg (born 1982), German cyclist
