= Adam Doneger =

American lacrosse player

Personal information
- Born: December 5, 1980 (age 45) Hewlett, New York, U.S.
- Height: 6 ft 1 in (185 cm)
- Weight: 220 lb (100 kg; 15 st 10 lb)

Sport
- Position: Midfield
- NLL draft: 306th overall (3rd to last), 2003; Buffalo Bandits
- MLL teams: New Jersey Pride
- NCAA team: Johns Hopkins University
- Pro career: 2003–2007

Adam Doneger (born December 5, 1980, in Hewlett, New York) is a former professional lacrosse player. He attended and played his college lacrosse at Johns Hopkins University where he was team Captain as a senior and a two-time First Team All-American.

== International career ==
Doneger played for the 2002 U.S. Men's National Team in World Lacrosse Championship that won the Gold Medal.

== Professional career ==
Adam Doneger was a midfielder with the New Jersey Pride in Major League Lacrosse. He won the Major League Lacrosse Rookie of the Year Award in 2003. He retired prior to the 2008 season.

Doneger currently serves as Executive Vice Chairman of U.S. Capital Markets at Newmark. He joined the firm in February 2023 after spending more than six years at Cushman & Wakefield. Over the course of his career, Doneger has worked on over $150 billion of transactions across all asset classes, including multifamily, office, retail, industrial, self-storage and hotel.

Prior to Cushman & Wakefield, Doneger worked at Eastdil Secured where he served as Managing Director and Brookfield Asset Management in their Real Estate Debt Fund. He began his career at Morgan Stanley in their real estate group.

== Statistics ==
=== MLL ===
		Regular Season
Season	Team	GP	G	2ptG	A	Pts	LB	PIM
2003	Rochester	12	26	2	2	30	19	4
2004	New Jersey	11	25	3	6	34	9	2
2005	New Jersey	12	22	3	4	29	11	4
2006	New Jersey	12	22	5	8	35	11	1
2007	New Jersey	11	11	1	6	18	5	3
MLL Totals		58	106	14	26	146	71	17

=== NCAA (Division I) ===
Season	Team	GP	G	A	Pts	PPG
2000	Johns Hopkins	--	21	7	28	--
2001	Johns Hopkins	--	18	12	30	--
2002	Johns Hopkins	14	24	4	28	--
2003	Johns Hopkins	16	28	7	35	--
NCAA Totals		--	91	30	121	--

== Awards ==
Preceded by Conor Gill	MLL Rookie of the Year; 2003	Succeeded by Ryan Boyle

== See also ==
- Johns Hopkins Blue Jays lacrosse
