= Nigel Priestley =

New Zealand earthquake engineer

Nigel Priestley ONZM
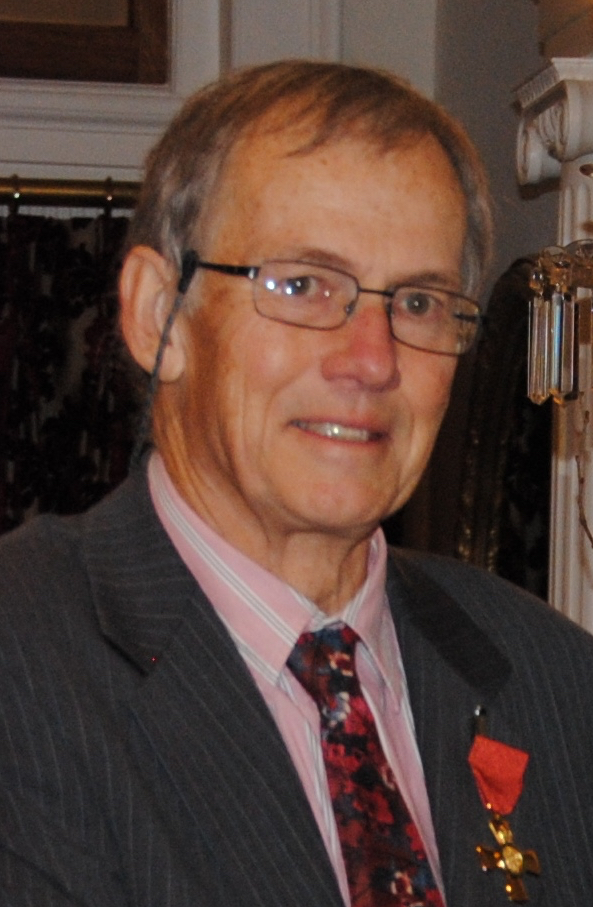
- Priestley in September 2014
- Born: Michael John Nigel Priestley; 21 July 1943; Wellington, New Zealand
- Died: 23 December 2014 (aged 71); Christchurch, New Zealand
- Education: University of Canterbury
- Awards: IPENZ Fulton Gold Medal (1973); ACI Raymond C. Reese Award (1983, 1989) fib Freyssinet Medal (2010); ONZM (2014)
- Scientific career
- Fields: Earthquake engineering
- Workplaces: Ministry of Works and Development; University of Canterbury; University of California, San Diego; ROSE School, Pavia
- Thesis: Moment redistribution in prestressed concrete continuous beams (1966)

Michael John Nigel Priestley ONZM (21 July 1943 – 23 December 2014) was a New Zealand earthquake engineer. He made significant contributions to the design and retrofit of concrete structures, and developed the first displacement-based method of seismic design.

== Early life and education ==
Born in Wellington in 1943, Priestley was educated at Wellington Technical College from 1956 to 1959. When aged 16, he began studying civil engineering at the University of Canterbury, completing a Bachelor of Engineering with first-class honours and, in 1966, a PhD. His thesis was titled Moment redistribution in prestressed concrete continuous beams.

== Professional and academic career ==
From 1967 to 1975, Priestley was the head of the structures laboratory at the Ministry of Works and Development central laboratories in Lower Hutt, where he led structural studies of bridges and buildings. In 1976 he returned to the University of Canterbury where he was a senior lecturer and then reader in the Department of Civil Engineering. Over the next 10 years he conducted research into the seismic behaviour of masonry structures in collaboration with Tom Paulay, and reinforced concrete columns in collaboration with Bob Park. He was also the consulting proof engineer for many major rail bridges and industrial buildings in New Zealand. He served as president of the New Zealand Society for Earthquake Engineering, from 1985 to 1986.

Priestley was then professor of structural engineering at the University of California, San Diego (UCSD) from 1987 until 2000. During this time his research focused on the seismic design of concrete bridges. In the wake of the 1989 Loma Prieta earthquake and the 1994 Northridge earthquake he was a member of various California Department of Transportation (Caltrans) committees and commissions reviewing the design of damaged bridges, and was also a member or chair of a number of Caltrans committees investigating the seismic strengthening of existing structures. He became professor emeritus of structural engineering at UCSD in 2001.

He co-founded the European School for Advanced Studies in Reduction of Seismic Risk (ROSE School) in Pavia, Italy, with Gian Michele Calvi, and served as its co-director from 2002 to 2008, and emeritus co-director from 2009.

Following the 2010 Canterbury earthquake and 2011 Christchurch earthquake, Priestley was an expert witness before the Royal Commission of Inquiry into Building Failure Caused by the Canterbury Earthquakes, and chaired a panel that investigated the collapse of the CTV Building and PGC Building, and damage to the Hotel Grand Chancellor and Forsyth Barr Building.

Priestley died in Christchurch of cancer on 23 December 2014.

== Legacy ==
Priestley was author or co-author of over 450 scientific papers and 250 research reports, and was the primary advisor for more than 25 doctoral students. His three books are regarded as canonical texts in their particular areas:

- Seismic Design of Concrete and Masonry Buildings with Tom Paulay (1992)
- Seismic Design and Retrofit of Bridges with Frieder Seible and Gian Michele Calvi (1996)
- Displacement-Based Seismic Design of Structures with Gian Michele Calvi and Mervyn Kowalsky (2007)

His research at UCSD with Frieder Seible following the 1989 Loma Prieta earthquake into structural deficiencies in reinforced concrete columns supported bridges in California led to the development of an economical retrofit solution involving the installation of a metal jacket to reduce the risk of column failure in seismic events. The method has been widely adopted, particularly on the west coast of the United States.

A team led by Priestley developed PRESSS (precast seismic structural system), a design methodology for earthquake-resistant buildings in which the building is designed as a collection of rocking blocks able to move independently of each other during a seismic event but are pulled back into their original position by unbonded post-tensioning cables within the precast concrete structure.

Priestley eschewed force-based design methods for earthquake-resistant buildings and developed the first method for displacement-based design, an approach that has been described as revolutionary. Traditional force-based methods could not adequately describe the expected damage, or performance, of a building subjected to seismic forces, whereas Priestley's displacement-based approach allows engineers to dictate the behaviour of a building in an earthquake.

== Honours and awards ==
Priestley was conferred honorary doctorates by ETH Zurich and the National University of Cuyo, Argentina. He was a Fellow of the Institution of Professional Engineers New Zealand (IPENZ), the American Concrete Institute (ACI), and the New Zealand Society for Earthquake Engineering. In 1999 he was elected an honorary Fellow of the Royal Society of New Zealand. He won over 30 national and international awards for his research and technical papers, including the Fulton Gold Medal from IPENZ in 1973, the Raymond C. Reese Award from the ACI in 1984 and 1989, and the Freyssinet Medal from the fib in 2010.

In the 2014 Queen's Birthday Honours, Priestley was appointed an Officer of the New Zealand Order of Merit, for services to structural engineering.
