= Bruce Bolt =

Seismologist and academic

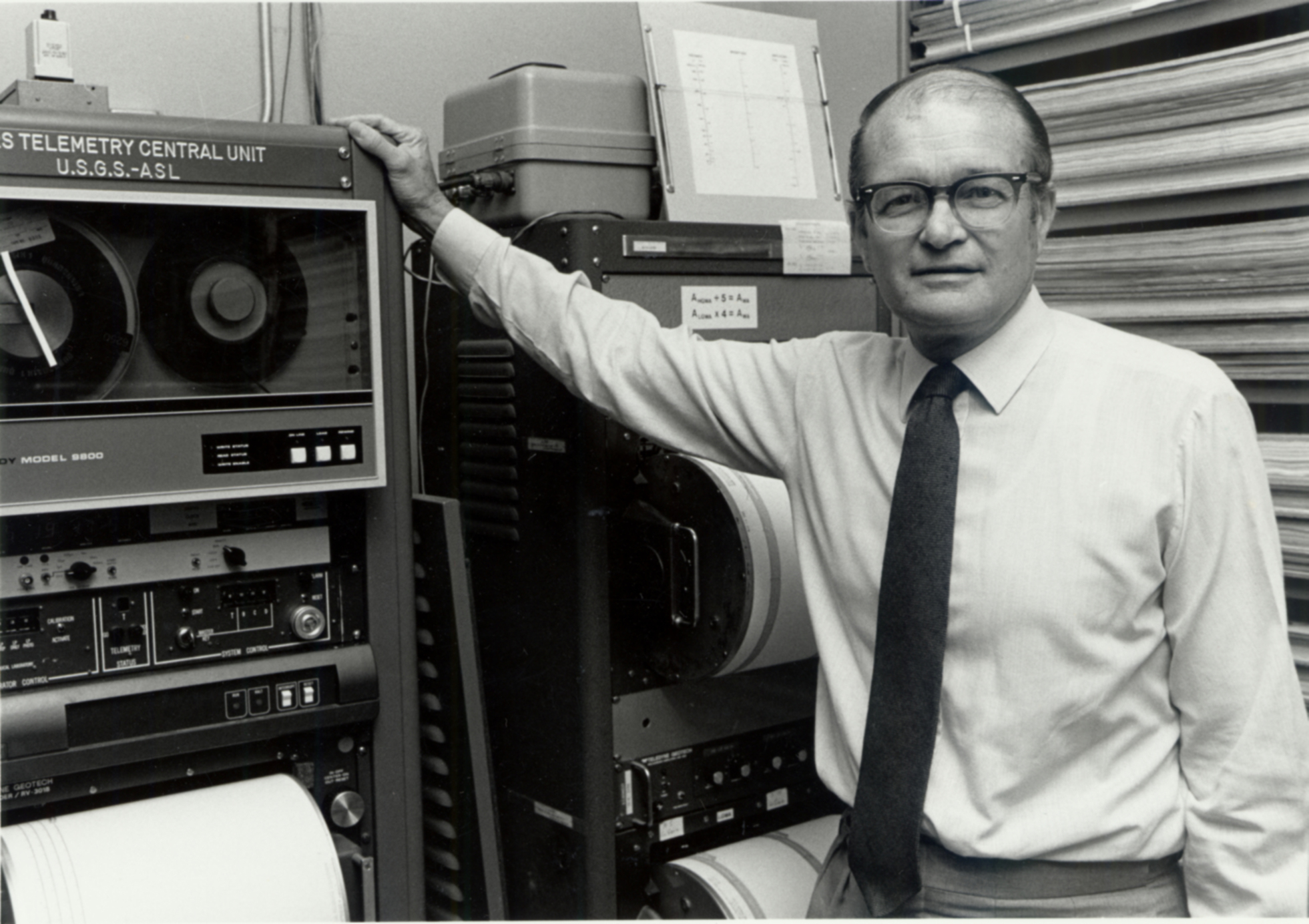
- Bruce Bolt at 1986
- Born: February 15, 1930; Largs, New South Wales, Australia
- Died: July 21, 2005 (aged 75); Oakland, California, US
- Citizenship: United States
- Education: University of Sydney
- Children: 4
- Awards: George W. Housner Medal (1990); Alfred E. Alquist Medal (1995)
- Scientific career
- Fields: Seismology
- Workplaces: University of California, Berkeley

Bruce Bolt (February 15, 1930 – July 21, 2005) was an Australian-born American seismologist and a professor of earth and planetary science at the University of California, Berkeley. Professor Bolt was known as a pioneer of seismic engineering. He served for 15 years on the California Seismic Safety Commission leading public debate on earthquake safety in that state, and acted as a consultant on major projects throughout the world. As well, Bolt published a number of popular and technical books on seismology.

His research led to construction of earthquake resilient bridges and buildings. Bolt was elected to the National Academy of Engineering "for application of the principles of seismology and applied mathematics to engineering decisions and public policy".

Since 2006, there is an award with his name, the Bruce A. Bolt Medal, to recognize individuals worldwide whose accomplishments involve the promotion and use of strong-motion earthquake data and whose leadership in the transfer of scientific and engineering knowledge into practice or policy has led to improved seismic safety.

== Early life and career ==
Bolt was born in Largs, New South Wales just north of Maitland in 1930. He studied at the University of Sydney obtaining his bachelor's degree in 1952, a master's degree in 1955 and a doctorate in applied mathematics in 1959. He also lectured at Sydney University in mathematics but developed an interest in mathematical modelling of the Earth's interior. He obtained a D.Sc. from Sydney University in 1972 while working at Berkeley. After visiting the Lamont Geological Observatory in New York, he visited the Department of Geodesy and Geophysics at Cambridge University where he met Professors Perry Byerly and John Verhoogen of UC Berkeley who invited him there.

== Career at Berkeley and consultant on seismology ==
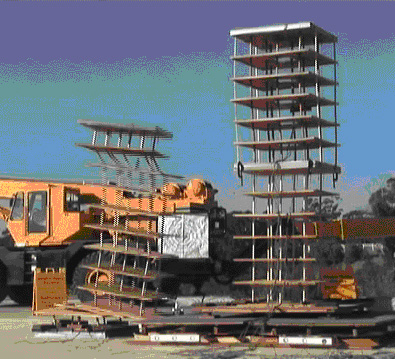
Crash testing of a regular building model (left) and a base-isolated building model (right) at UCSD

Bolt started as director of the Berkeley Seismological Stations (now the Berkeley Seismological Laboratory) in 1963 and served in that position until 1991. In that position, he was at the forefront of seismology especially as a pioneer of engineering seismology. He identified the impact of near-fault effects of earthquakes as well as the "fling" where the fault slips during an earthquake which has a strong impact on structures near the quake. Professor Bolt was elected to the US National Academy of Engineering in 1978 as recognition for his contribution to that profession. As director of the Berkeley Seismology Center, Bolt pioneered the use of digital recordings rather than paper readouts to read data.

Bolt identified that the epicenter of the 1906 San Francisco earthquake was near Daly City, California not near Olema, California in Marin County as had been previously thought. He also helped to design a simulation of the 1906 quake at the California Academy of Sciences museum in Golden Gate Park which has been seen by millions of people. He has written a number of works including Earthquakes: a Primer in 1978 and Inside the Earth: Evidence from Earthquakes in 1982.

Professor Bolt served on the California Seismic Safety Commission for 15 years including a year as chairman in 1986. In that position, he had a significant impact on California's earthquake safety legislation and helped to create that states mandatory system of earthquake hazard mapping.

Bruce retired from teaching in 1993 and became professor emeritus of seismology, thus continuing his academic activities until his death. He was a consultant on seismology for every major earthquake engineering project including on the Diablo Canyon Power Plant as well as international projects including the Aswan Dam, the Trans-Alaska Pipeline System and BART tube under the San Francisco Bay.

After the 2004 Indian Ocean earthquake and tsunami, he started to work on characterizing the seismic sources and assessing tsunami risk. This probably was his last work as consultant on seismology.

Bolt died of pancreatic cancer in July 2005 at the Kaiser Permanente Medical Center in Oakland. He was a citizen of the US at the time of his death.

== Scientific and academic positions and recognitions ==
During his career, professor Bolt served as a member of a number of important scientific and academic organizations, including:

- President of the California Academy of Sciences between 1982 and 1985;
- Member of the board of trustees for the California Academy of Sciences between 1981–92 and again in 1999;
- President of the Academic Senate at Berkeley in 1992–93; and
- President of the Faculty Club at Berkeley between 1994 and 2004;
- President of the Seismological Society of America in 1974;
- Bulletin editor of the Seismological Society of America between 1965 and 1972; and
- President of the International Association of Seismology and Physics of the Earth's Interior between 1980 and 1983.
- Chairman of the California Seismic Safety Commission.

Bruce Bolt received many awards for his scientific achievements, among them:

- The Berkeley Citation in 1993.
- Alfred E. Alquist Special Recognition Medal, in 1994.
- Distinguished Lecture Award of the Earthquake Engineering Research Institute, in 1998.
- George W. Housner Medal, in 2000.

In 1995, Bolt delivered the fifth Mallet-Milne memorial lecture (entitled From Earthquake Acceleration to Seismic Displacement) for the Society for Earthquake and Civil Engineering Dynamics, in London.

In 2006, the Earthquake Engineering Research Institute jointly with the Seismological Society of America established an award in his name, The Bruce A. Bolt Medal, to recognize individuals worldwide whose accomplishments involve the promotion and use of strong-motion earthquake data and whose leadership in the transfer of scientific and engineering knowledge into practice or policy has led to improved seismic safety.

== Written works ==
Professor Bolt wrote six textbooks and edited eight book on earthquakes, geology and computers among other topics.

- Geophysics Editor Academic Press New York 1973 ISBN 0-12-460813-2
- Geological Hazards: Earthquakes, Tsunamis, Volcanoes, Avalanches, Landslides, Floods editor 1975 and 1977 Springer-Verlag New York ISBN 0-387-90254-6
- Nuclear Explosions and Earthquakes: the Parted Veil W.H. Freeman San Francisco 1976 ISBN 0-7167-0276-2
- Earthquakes: A Primer W.H. Freeman San Francisco 1978 ISBN 0-7167-0094-8.
- Inside the Earth: Evidence from Earthquakes W.H. Freeman San Francisco 1982 ISBN 0-7167-1359-4
- Earthquakes 5 editions 1987–2003, 2003 edition published by W. H. Freeman New York ISBN 0-7167-5618-8
- Earthquakes: 2006 Centennial Update W. H. Freeman; Fifth Edition (August 5, 2005) ISBN 0-7167-7548-4 and ISBN 978-0-7167-7548-5
- Earthquakes and Geological Discovery Scientific American Library New York 1993 ISBN 0-7167-5040-6

He also wrote almost 200 research papers, including:

- Bolt, B.; Qamar, A. (10 October 1970). "An upper bound to the density jump at the boundary of the Earth's inner core". Nature. 228 (5267): 148–150. Bibcode:1970Natur.228..148B. doi:10.1038/228148a0. PMID 16058450. S2CID 4222492.
- Shi, Y.; Bolt, B. (1982). "The standard error of the magnitude-frequency b value". Bulletin of the Seismological Society of America. 72 (5): 1677–1687. Bibcode:1982BuSSA..72.1677S. doi:10.1785/BSSA0720051677. Archived from the original on 23 September 2015.
- Bolt, Bruce A. (1987). "50 years of studies on the inner core". EOS. 68 (6): 73, 80–81. Bibcode:1987EOSTr..68Q..73B. doi:10.1029/EO068i006p00073-01.
- Bolt, Bruce A. (1997). "Inge Lehmann". Biographical Memoirs of Fellows of the Royal Society. 43: 285–301. doi:10.1098/rsbm.1997.0016.
