= Andrew J. Whittle =

British geotechnical engineer

Andrew John Whittle
- Education: Imperial College
- Known for: MIT-E3 soil model
- Awards: Casagrande Award (1994); Croes Medal (1994); Middlebrooks Prize (1997, 2002, and 2005); Huber Research Award (1998); US National Academy of Engineering (2010); Karl Terzaghi Lecture (2024)
- Scientific career
- Fields: Geotechnical engineering Soil constitutive modelling
- Workplaces: Imperial College; Massachusetts Institute of Technology
- Thesis: A constitutive model for overconsolidated clays with application to the cyclic loading of friction piles (1987)
- Doctoral advisor: Mohsen M. Baligh
- Website: cee.mit.edu/whittle

Andrew John Whittle is Edmund K. Turner Professor of Civil and Environmental Engineering and former Head of the Department of Civil & Environmental Engineering at the Massachusetts Institute of Technology. He specializes in Geotechnical Engineering and more particularly in numerical and constitutive modelling.

== Education ==
Andrew J. Whittle studied Civil Engineering at Imperial College London, graduating with a first class BSc (Hons) in 1981. While at Imperial College, he carried out research in Geotechnical Engineering under the advisory of Professor David Hight. He continued his studies at the Massachusetts Institute of Technology, working on a range of problems on soil anisotropy, from both experimental and numerical perspectives, under the advisory of Professor Mohsen M. Baligh, which led to the award of a Sc.D. (The MIT's PhD) degree in 1987 with his thesis titled "A constitutive model for overconsolidated clays with application to the cyclic loading of friction piles". His research formed the basis of the MIT-E3 anisotropic soil constitutive model for overconsolidated clays.

== Academic work and research ==
Dr. Whittle joined the MIT faculty as an assistant professor in 1988, became a full professor in 2000, and served as the head of the MIT's Department of Civil and Environmental Engineering, 2009–2013.

Dr. Whittle is an expert in geotechnical engineering, whose research deals principally with formulation of constitutive models for representing the complex mechanical properties of soils and their application in predicting the performance of foundations and underground construction projects. His research has been widely used in the design of foundation systems for deepwater oil production facilities and in major urban excavation and tunneling projects including the Central Artery-Third Harbor Tunnel ('Big Dig') in Boston, and Tren Urbano in San Juan, Puerto Rico. Most recently he has led research efforts in the application of wireless sensor networks for monitoring underground water distribution systems and construction projects.

Dr. Whittle is a Co-Editor of the "International Journal for Numerical and Analytical Methods in Geomechanics" (since 1999). He is an active consultant who has worked on more than 30 major onshore and offshore construction projects and was an expert involved in the investigations into the collapse of the Nicoll Highway in Singapore (2004–2006). He has also served on a series of major review panels: for the National Research Council and National Academy of Engineering (NRC/NAE) investigating the performance of hurricane protection systems in New Orleans; for the Governor of Massachusetts on a 'stem-to-stern' safety review of the Big Dig tunnels in Boston; for the Chief Executive of Hong Kong investigating the delay in the works of the Hong- Kong section of the Guangzhou-Shenzhen-Hong Kong Express rail link (XRL); and as a member of the board of directors for the Massachusetts Department of Transportation (2009–2015).

Dr. Whittle has published more than 190 papers in refereed journals and conferences, and received several awards for his work from the American Society of Civil Engineers, including the Casagrande Award (1994), the Croes Medal (1994), Middlebrooks Prize (1997, 2002, and 2005), Huber Research Award (1998) and Karl Terzaghi Lecture (2024). He is a licensed professional engineer in New York State. In 2010, he was elected to the National Academy of Engineering.

== See also ==
- Imperial College Civil & Environmental Engineering
