= Xavier Le Pichon =

French geophysicist (1937–2025)

- Born: 18 June 1937; Qui Nhơn, Annam, French Indochina
- Died: 22 March 2025 (aged 87); Sisteron, France
- Citizenship: France
- Education: University of Caen Normandy; Ecole et Observatoire des Sciences de la Terre
- Known for: Comprehensive model of plate tectonics
- Awards: CNRS Silver Medal, member of the French Academy of Sciences; knight of the Legion of Honour; Wollaston Medal; foreign associate of the United States National Academy of Sciences;Balzan Prize
- Scientific career
- Fields: Geophysics
- Workplaces: Columbia University, Collège de France, oceanological centre of Brittany, Pierre and Marie Curie University, École Normale Supérieure

Xavier Le Pichon (French pronunciation: [ɡzavje lə piʃɔ̃]; 18 June 1937 – 22 March 2025) was a French geophysicist. Among many other contributions, he was known for his comprehensive model of plate tectonics (1968), helping create the field of plate tectonics. In 1968, he combined the kinematic ideas of W. J. Morgan, D. McKenzie and R. L. Parker with the large data sets collected by Lamont, and especially with the respective magnetic profiles, show that Plate Tectonics could accurately describe the evolution of the major ocean basins. He was a professor at the Collège de France, holder of the Chair of Geodynamics (1986–2008). He was a lifelong fervent Catholic and came to think of caring attention to others' weaknesses as an essential quality that allowed humanity to evolve. He lived with his wife and had six children and eleven grandchildren. He died in Sisteron on 22 March 2025, at the age of 87.

== Timeline ==
Le Pichon held a doctorate in physics. Professional career:

- 1963: He began his scientific career as a scientific assistant at Columbia University, New York, United States.
- In 1969, he became head of the marine geology department of the oceanology center of Brittany in Brest, France.
- In 1978, he became professor at Université P. et M. Curie (University of Paris VI).
- In 1984, he was head of the geology department at the École Normale Supérieure.
- In 1986, he became a professor at the Collège de France.

== Prizes and memberships of learned societies ==
- In 1973, he won the CNRS Silver Medal.
- 1984: Maurice Ewing Medal from the American Geophysical Union
- 1985: member of the French Academy of Sciences; made knight of the Legion of Honour
- 1990: Japan Prize; made officer of the National Order of Merit
- 1991: Wollaston Medal, Geological Society of London
- 1995: foreign associate of the United States National Academy of Sciences
- 2002: Balzan Prize

== Works ==
- Riffaud, Claude; Le Pichon, Xavier (1976). Expédition 'Famous' à 3000 m sous l'Atlantique. Paris: Albin Michel.
- Le Pichon, Xavier (1986). Kaiko, voyage aux extrémités de la mer. Le Seuil: Odile Jacob. ISBN 978-2020092333.
- Yijie, Tang; Le Pichon, Xavier (1999). La mort. Paris: Desclée de Brouwer. ISBN 978-2220044026.
- Le Pichon, Xavier; Francheteau, Jean; Bonnin, Jean (2013). Plate Tectonics (revised ed.). Elsevier. ISBN 9781483257273.
