= Society for Earthquake and Civil Engineering Dynamics =

- Abbreviation: SECED
- Formation: 1969
- Type: NGO
- Purpose: Professional association
- Coordinates: 51.5011°N 0.1290°W
- Website: www.seced.org.uk

The Society for Earthquake and Civil Engineering Dynamics (SECED) was founded in 1969 to promote the study and practice of earthquake engineering and structural dynamics, including blast, impact and other vibration problems. It also supports study of societal and economic ramifications of major earthquakes.

It is the British branch of both the International Association (IAEE) and the European Association of Earthquake Engineering (EAEE). It is an Associated Society of the Institution of Civil Engineers (ICE), and is sponsored by the Institution of Mechanical Engineers (IMechE), the Institution of Structural Engineers (IStructE) and the Geological Society.

SECED has organised conferences and lectures (see below). It hosted a 2002 European conference on earthquake engineering in London, and in July 2015 hosted a two-day conference at Homerton College, Cambridge titled Earthquake Risk and Engineering towards a Resilient World. It also organises regular meetings and has published a newsletter since 1987.

== Mallet–Milne lectures ==
It organises the biennial Mallet–Milne Lecture, named after Robert Mallet and John Milne, regarded as the founding fathers of engineering seismology. The inaugural lecture was given at the ICE in London on 27 May 1987.

No	YEAR	LECTURER	SUBJECT	AFFILIATION
1	1987	Professor Nicholas Ambraseys	Engineering Seismology	Imperial College
2	1989	Professor George W. Housner	Coping With Natural Disasters	California Institute of Technology
3	1991	Professor Geoffrey Warburton	Reduction of Vibrations	University of Nottingham
4	1993	Professor Thomas Paulay	Simplicity and Confidence in Seismic Design	University of Canterbury, Christchurch, New Zealand
5	1995	Professor Bruce Bolt	From Earthquake Acceleration to Seismic Displacement	University of California, Berkeley
6	1997	Professor Roy Severn	Structural Response Prediction Using Experimental Data	University of Bristol
7	1999	Professor Cinna Lomnitz	The Road to Total Earthquake Safety	National Autonomous University of Mexico
8	2001	Dr James A. Jackson	Living with Earthquakes: Know Your Faults	University of Cambridge
9	2003	Professor Nigel Priestley	Revisiting Myths and Fallacies in Earthquake Engineering	University of California, San Diego & Rose School, Italy
10	2005	W.D Liam Finn	A Study of Piles during Earthquakes: Issues of Design and Analysis	Kagawa University & University of British Columbia
11	2007	Professor Robin Spence	Saving Lives in Earthquakes: Successes and Failures in Seismic Protection from 1960	University of Cambridge
12	2009	Dr. Roger Bilham	The Seismic Future of Cities	University of Colorado, Boulder
13	2011	Lloyd Cluff	The Practice of Earthquake Geology: Career-Changing Events and Life Stories	Pacific Gas and Electric Company, California
14	2013	Roger Musson	A History of British Seismology	British Geological Survey
15	2015	Professor Sudhir K. Jain	Earthquake Safety in India: Achievements, Challenges and Opportunities	Indian Institute of Technology Gandhinagar
16	2017	Edmund Booth	Dealing with Earthquakes: Earthquake engineering as if people mattered	Edmund Booth Associates
17	2019			

== See also ==
- Named lectures
