= Sarada K. Sarma =

British academic

Sarada Kanta Sarma
- Born: India
- Citizenship: British, Indian
- Education: Imperial College London; Indian Institute of Technology
- Known for: Sarma method of Slope stability analysis (static & seismic)
- Scientific career
- Fields: Engineering Seismology, Soil Mechanics
- Workplaces: Imperial College London
- Thesis: Response characteristics and stability of earth dams during strong earthquakes (1968)
- Doctoral advisor: Nicholas Ambraseys

Sarada Kanta Sarma is a geotechnical engineer, emeritus reader of engineering seismology and senior research investigator at Imperial College London. He has developed a method of seismic slope stability analysis which is named after him, the Sarma method.

== Curriculum ==
Sarma was initially educated in India, studying civil engineering at the Indian Institute of Technology in Kharagpur and then geotechnical engineering at Imperial College specialising in earthquake engineering and engineering seismology. He worked under the supervision of professor Nicholas Ambraseys and obtained his PhD degree in 1968; being the first PhD degree awarded by the Imperial College Engineering Seismology Section (followed by Dimitri Papastamatiou in 1971). His thesis title was "Response characteristics and stability of earth dams during strong earthquakes". He joined the staff in 1967 as a lecturer in Engineering Seismology.

== Scientific work ==
His major research focused on engineering seismology and geotechnical engineering. He specialised in seismic analysis and performance of soil slopes, earth dams and the earthquake resistant design of foundations and design code development and evaluation.

He developed a new method of analysing the stability of slopes and dams in seismic conditions and calculating the permanent displacements due to strong shaking. This method, published in the 1970s (several publications of this method are found in 1973, 1975 and 1979) is named after him (Sarma method) and it is a special case of a Limit Equilibrium method of geotechnical analysis. It has been extensively used in seismic analysis software for many years, although nowadays modern finite element analysis software are more widely used for special case studies.

The Sarma method is called an advanced and rigorous method of static and seismic slope stability analysis. It is called advanced, because it can take account of non-circular failure surfaces. Also, the multi-wedge approach allows for non-vertical slices and irregular slope geometry. It is called a rigorous method, because it can satisfy all the three conditions of equilibrium, horizontal and vertical forces and moments. The Sarma method is nowadays used as a verification to finite element programs (also FE limit analysis) and it is the standard method used for seismic analysis.

In recognition of his contribution to earthquake engineering, he has been awarded a number of awards and has been invited to give lectures, serve the academic advisory board of several conferences and provide consulting work and advice for various dam projects. Sarma retired from Imperial College in 2004.

== See also ==
- Slope stability
- Imperial College Civil & Environmental Engineering
