= Ecole et Observatoire des Sciences de la Terre =

Research lab in Strasbourg, France

Coordinates: 48°34′47″N 7°45′43″E

- Other names: School and Observatory for Earth Sciences
- Established: 1997 (before, École de Physique du Globe, c. 1830)
- Affiliations: University of Strasbourg, Alsace Tech
- Students: approx. 145
- Location: Strasbourg, France
- Campus: Esplanade

The École et Observatoire des Sciences de la Terre ('School and Observatory for Earth Sciences') is a French institution under the supervisory authority of the University of Strasbourg and the CNRS-INSU (National Center for Scientific Research, National Institute of Science of Universe) in charge of education, research, observation in Earth Science and its diffusion. Situated in two buildings located on the central campus of the University of Strasbourg, EOST consists of more than 150 permanent employees among its staff.

== History ==
The School and Observatory for Earth Sciences was created by decree in 1997 from the fusion of the Geology and Earth Physics institutes of the Faculty of Sciences of the University of Strasbourg. Interests in Earth Physics arose around 1880 in Germany with the birth of seismology and meteorology. The origin of the Geology Institute is even older and is linked to the French development of the University during the first half of the 19th century. After the annexation of Alsace by Germany, the Imperial University pursued a policy of elitism, basing its excellence on fundamental research as practiced at the University of Wilhelm von Humboldt (early 19th century). The same model was used when the French Grandes Ecoles were built. Since 1920, the IPGS and the IPGP (Institut de Physique du Globe de Paris) conducted research and geophysical observations non-stop, without interruption during the War. Between 1939 and 1945, the IPGS was relocated in Clermont-Ferrand, were the Diplômes d'Ingénieurs were signed by Louis Cagnard, a famous French geophysicist.

== The school ==
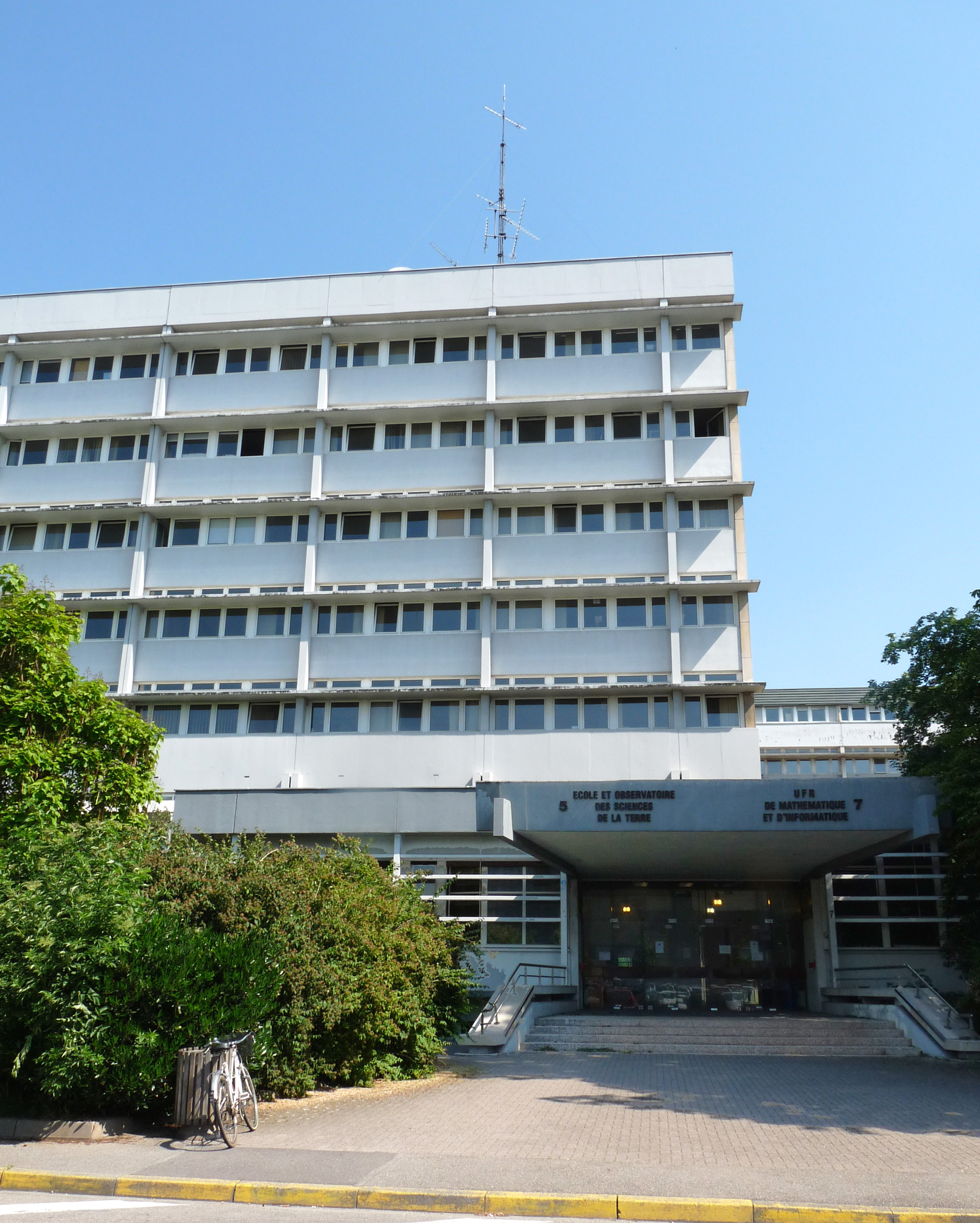
Main building of the EOST and the IPGS

The EOST engineering school is a French Grande École specialized in Earth sciences and accredited to deliver European University degrees, such as the Licence/Master/Doctorat, but also the French Diplôme d'Ingénieur. The school is a component of the University of Strasbourg. Professors and researchers of the EOST are affiliated with the Institut Terre et Environnement de Strasbourg (ITES). External keynote speakers from the industry and various research organisms also contribute extensively to teaching at the EOST.

=== Application process ===
After two years of Classes Préparatoires aux Grandes Ecoles, students take part into a national competitive examination. According to their results and ranking, they may apply to the EOST:

- 11 places for students majoring in Mathematics and Physics
- 12 places for students majoring in Physics and Chemistry
- 2 places for students majoring in Physics and Engineering Sciences
- 8 places for students majoring in Biology, Chemistry, Physics and Earth Sciences
- 8 places for students coming from the university system, majoring either in Mathematics, Physics or Earth Sciences

=== Curriculum ===
The school delivers the Diplôme d'Ingénieur de l'Ecole et Observatoire des Sciences de la Terre de l'Université de Strasbourg, which is equivalent to a master's degree in Geophysical Engineering.

The classes are distributed as follows (as of 2011/2012):

1. First year: Mathematics, Computer Science, Continuum Mechanics, Earth Physics, Electromagnetism, Tectonics, Signal Processing, Seismic Waves, Physical Geodesy, Fracturation of Rocks, Fluid Mechanics, Sedimentary Petrology, Introduction to GIS, Field Work in the Alps, Computer Science project, Geophysics Laboratory, Industrial Economics, English, Second language (optional)
2. Second year: Signal Processing, Numerical Analysis, Seismology (Earth models), Spatial Geodesy, Rock Physics, Dynamics of the Earth, Tectonics and Sedimentation, Inverse Methods, Seismology (earthquakes), Potential Fields, Seismic Imaging, Hydrology, Geomagnetism, Geophysics Laboratory, Geophysical Research Project, Well-logging, Seismic Acquisition and Geostatistics, Borehole Geophysics Field Camp, Sustainable development and Quality-Health-Security Environment, Accounting and Finance, Intellectual Property, Business Choices and Management, English, Second language (optional)
3. Third year: Geophysics Field Camp, English, Economics of Energy, Business Organization and Strategy + choice between two different options:
- Geophysics applied to exploration and production of natural resources: Seismic Reservoir Characterization, Reservoir Hydrodynamics, Petrophysics for Reservoir Simulation, Seismic Processing and Inversion, Potentials Fields, Seismic Stratigraphy
- Geophysics applied to civil engineering and environmental studies: Geotechnics, Strength of Materials applied to Civil Engineering, Geomechanics, Hydrogeophysics, Electromagnetic Methods, Seismic Hazards

After the first semester of their third year, students need to complete an internship in the industry or in a research organism in order to obtain their degree. In parallel, the top students who want to pursue in the academy can enroll in a master's degree - one in Earth Sciences (delivered by the University of Strasbourg), and one in Environmental Sciences and Engineering (co-delivered by the University of Strasbourg and the Ecole Nationale du Génie de l'Eau et de l'Environnement).

=== National and international partnerships ===
The EOST can deliver two different double degrees in partnership with

- the Ecole Nationale Supérieure de Géologie (ENSG) in Nancy, France

Moreover, student exchanges are highly encouraged and partnerships with the following universities have been established through the Erasmus student exchange program

- Imperial College, London, UK
- LMU Munich, Germany
- Norwegian University of Science and Technology (NTNU), Trondheim, Norway
- University of Bergen, Bergen, Norway
- Universidad Complutense, Madrid, Spain
- University of Oslo, Oslo, Norway
- University of Trieste, Italy

=== Student organizations ===
Several organizations are based in the EOST buildings:

- the Bureau des Elèves de l'EOST (BDE, literally "Board of Students"), organizing student life and cultural events
- the Bureau des Sports de l'EOST (BDS, literally "Board of Sports"), organizing sport events against teams from other engineering schools
- the Strasbourg University Geophysical Society (SUGS), French student component of the SEG, organizing geophysical and archeological campaigns in Alsace
- Geophyse, the Alumni association

The EOST is also a member of

- the Poly, an association of the Engineering students of Strasbourg
- the Alsace Tech network, the network of Engineering and Management Grandes Ecoles of Alsace
- the BNEI, the National Board of Engineering Students

=== Notable alumni and professors ===
- Philippe Louis Voltz (1785–1840), founder of the Société d'Histoire Naturelle de Strasbourg (Strasbourg Society of Natural History).
- Auguste Daubrée (1814–1896), Chair of Mineralogy and Geology (1838).
- Guillaume Philippe Schimper (1808–1880), botanist and paleontologist. Chair of Mineralogy and Geology (1862). Author of the first treatise of paleobotany.
- Ernst Wilhelm Benecke (1838–1917), Chair of Geology and Paleontology.
- Paul Groth (1843–1927), Chair of Mineralogy and Petrography.
- Georg Gerland (1833–1919), founder of the first journal of geophysics in 1887 ("Beiträge zur Geophysik"). Creator of both the German Central Station of Seismology and the International Central Bureau of Seismology.
- Oskar Hecker (1864–1938), seismologist.
- August Heinrich Sieberg (1875–1945), seismologist.
- Beno Gutenberg (1889–1960), seismologist. Creator and first director (1947) of the Seismological Laboratory of the California Institute of Technology.
- Georg Friedel (1865–1933), crystallographer.
- Jacques de Lapparent (1883–1948), author of the first treatise of petrography in French.
- Maurice Gignoux (1881–1955), alpine geologists and stratigrapher.
- Léon Moret (1890–1970), paleontologist.
- Georges Dubois (1890–1953), palynologist.
- Emmanuel de Margerie (1862–1953), Director of the Service de la Carte Géologique d'Alsace et de Lorraine (Alsace-Lorraine Geological Survey).
- Edmond Rothé (1873–1942), Director of both the Institute and the Bureau Central Sismologique pour la France et ses Colonies (Seismological Central Bureau of France and its Colonies)
- Xavier Le Pichon (1937-), Chair of Geodynamics at the Collège de France, pioneer of plate tectonics for which he proposed a model in 1968.

A more extensive list of alumni can be found on.

== Research unit ==
EOST hosts one research unit: the Institut Terre et Environnement de Strasbourg.

Research at ITES is currently focused on the comprehension of geological and geophysical phenomenon as well as applied sciences: environment, natural resources (energy, water) and hazards (seismic risks, landslides); but also to the analysis and the understanding of hydrological and geochemical phenomenon in natural environments.

EOST is the leader of the "laboratory of excellence" G-eau-thermie profonde project aiming to initiate a new research center for deep geothermal energy. Improving the knowledge of deep geothermal reservoirs and developing techniques are the main goals for the exploitation of this sustainable resource.

EOST is involved in the REALISE network (Réseau Alsacien des Laboratoires en Ingénierie et Sciences de l’Environnement) and also provides leadership and administration. This network sets out to structure regional environmental research.

== Observatories ==
EOST is an Observatory of Universe Sciences (Observatoire des Sciences de l'Univers - OSU) () under the supervisory authority of the CNRS - INSU (Institut National des Sciences de l'Univers - French national center for scientific research) and the University of Strasbourg. Its missions are to contribute to the monitoring of natural phenomenon and to provide the scientific community with data. Earthquakes, magnetic fields, gravity force, water chemical composition, gravitational instability are some examples of the natural phenomenon observed by EOST. To understand operational mechanisms at different time and space scales require human and instrumental resources. Observation is based on measuring devices relaying data to computer systems acquisition and processing. Maintenance and improvement of these tools are an important part of the mission of the observatories. Data analysis and model building is part of the mission as well as providing the scientific community with data. It aims to the better understanding and prediction of natural phenomenon. Each year, a great amount of published scientific articles are based on data collected by EOST's observational services, organized into themes: seismology, geodesy and gravimetry, magnetism, landslide processes, environment. EOST is the national coordinator (for the BCSF-Rénass, ISGI or OHGE) or active participant member of national networks (as the BCMT or RENAG). This network organization allows the sharing of means and skills.

=== Seismology ===
The record and analysis of seismic waves enable researchers to understand the earth dynamics and to improve knowledge of seismic hazard. EOST is in charge of measuring devices localized both in the North-East of France and abroad (Sénégal, Terres Austales et Antarctiques Françaises). They are integrated in national (Réseau large Bande Permanent RLBP, Réseau Accélérométrique Permanent,...) and international networks. EOST is the national coordinator of the RLBP as well as the Bureau Central sismologique Français (BCSF) and the Réseau national de surveillance sismique (RéNaSS).These last two centralize all earthquakes data located on the French territory. Instrumental data are completed by population enquiries: the BCSF gathers comments on earthquakes felt in France.

- Bureau central sismologique français (BCSF)/ Réseau national de surveillance sismique (RéNaSS)
- Réseau large bande permanent (RLBP)
- Observatoire sismologique régional du Fossé Rhénan
- Géoscope (Terres australes, Antarctique, Sénégal et Alsace)

=== Geodesy and gravimetry ===
Geodesy and gravimetry allow the analysis of earth structure and strain. These methods are complementary to seismology. The geodesic observational service of Strasbourg is part of the Réseau National de Géodésie RENAG (national geodesic network). EOST is responsible for 8 GPS stations located in the Rhénan area, assigned to study the tectonic strain of the North-East of France. EOST is also responsible for the Gravimetric observatory of Strasbourg. Through a superconducting gravimeter, the observatory provides relative and continuous gravity field measurements. The observatory is part of the international project Global Geodynamics Project (GGP). The project MIGA intends to create a new infrastructure based on quantum mechanics. This infrastructure will allow a better comprehension of terrestrial gravity variations and its implications.

- RENAG (Fossé rhénan)
- Observatoire gravimétrique de Strasbourg

=== Magnetism ===
Observation of magnetism aims to comprehend the origins of magnetic fields variations at different time scales. EOST runs six permanent magnetic stations located in the Terres Australes et Antarctiques Française and in Madagascar Island. They are part of the Bureau Central de magnétisme terrestre (BCMT) network, under the supervisory authority of the Institut de Physique du Globe de Paris. EOST hosts the headquarters of the International Service of Geomagnetic Indices (ISGI) the service of the International Association of Geomagnetism and Aeronomy (IAGA).

=== Landslides processes ===
L’Observatoire multidisciplinaire des instabilités des versants OMIV (Multidisciplinary observatory for landsides processes) follows the evolution of several landslides in France through geophysics, geodesic, geochemical and hydrologic data. EOST is responsible for the Super-Sauze, La Valette (Southern Alps) and Villerville (Normandie) landslides as well as the coordination of the acquisition and the analysis of kinematics data.

- Observatoire multidisciplinaire des instabilités des versants

=== Environment: surfaces et interfaces continentales ===
The main study site of the Observatoire hydro-géochimique de l’environnement (OHGE) is a granitic catchment basin: the Strengbach. This site is located in the Vosgian massif between 800 and 1100 meters high. The ecosystems and its changes, linked to natural or anthropic disruption, have been studied and monitored for more than twenty-five years throughout a multidisciplinary approach.

- Observatoire hydrogéochimique de l’environnement

== Museums and collections ==
The Museum of seismology and terrestrial magnetism, located in the former seismological station of Strasbourg, inaugurated on 1 July 1900, displays instruments for geophysical measurements and their evolution throughout history. The collection of the Museum of mineralogy hosts more than 30 000 international samples of minerals and meteors. Many of the most beautiful pieces are frequently exposed in France and abroad. The museum is situated in a historical monument of EOST, built at the end of the 19th century.

== See also ==
- University of Strasbourg
- Universities in France
- Education in France
- League of European Research Universities
