= International Federation for Structural Concrete =

The International Federation for Structural Concrete (fib – Fédération internationale du béton)
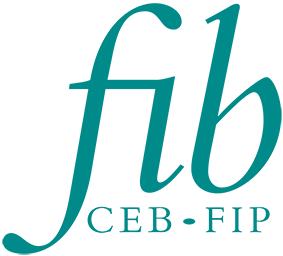
- Formation: 1998
- Legal status: Not-for-profit organization
- Purpose: To develop at an international level the study of scientific and practical matters capable of advancing the technical, economic, aesthetic and environmental performance of concrete construction
- Location: Lausanne, Switzerland
- Region served: Worldwide
- Members: 42 national member groups and approximately 1,000 individual or corporate members in 104 countries and regions
- Official language: English
- President: Iria Doniak
- Main organ: General Assembly
- Website: www.fib-international.org
- Remarks: Created by the merger of the CEB and FIP

The Fédération internationale du béton – International Federation for Structural Concrete (fib) is a not-for-profit association committed to advancing the technical, economic, aesthetic and environmental performances of concrete structures worldwide.

== History ==
The fib was created in 1998 via the merger of the Comité européen du béton - European Committee for Concrete (CEB; later: Comité euro-international du béton; established in 1953) and the Fédération Internationale de la Précontrainte - International Federation for Prestressing (FIP; inaugurated in 1952 at an international meeting in Cambridge, United Kingdom).

In 1962 a common initiative by the FIP and CEB led to the creation of the Mixed CEB-FIP Committee for Drafting of Recommendations for Prestressed Concrete.

In 1983 the Ecole polytechnique fédérale de Lausanne (EPFL) in Switzerland invited the CEB to open an office on its campus. Today this office is the headquarters of the fib.

The CEB and the FIP merged in 1998 during the last FIP Congress to form the "fib". The fib continues the work of its founding associations.

== Working structure ==
The fib’s general assembly (GA) is composed of delegates appointed by the organization’s national member groups. There are forty-one national member groups (NMGs) in the fib. They act as forums for co-operation and coordination. The general assembly deals with high-level administrative and technical matters, such as elections, finances, statutes and the approval of model codes.
The technical council (TC) oversees the work of the commissions and task groups. The commissions and task groups of the fib develop the technical bulletins that form the cornerstone of the fib’s activities.
The presidium is the organization’s executive committee and implements decisions made by the GA and the TC. It handles such matters as the scheduling of events, membership, awards and honours.

== Member countries ==
In 2025 the fib counts forty-two member countries. They are: Argentina, Australia, Austria, Belgium, Brazil, Canada, China, Cyprus, Czech Republic, Denmark, Finland, France, Germany, Greece, Hungary, Iceland, India, Iran, Israel, Italy, Japan, Luxembourg, the Netherlands, New Zealand, Norway, Poland, Portugal, Romania, Russia, Slovakia, Slovenia, South Africa, South Korea, Spain, Sweden, Switzerland, Tanzania, Turkey, Ukraine, the United Arab Emirates, the United Kingdom and the United States of America.
