= Newmark-beta method =

Concept in differential equation mathematics

The Newmark-beta method is a method of numerical integration used to solve certain differential equations. It is widely used in numerical evaluation of the dynamic response of structures and solids such as in finite element analysis to model dynamic systems. The method is named after Nathan M. Newmark, former Professor of Civil Engineering at the University of Illinois at Urbana–Champaign, who developed it in 1959 for use in structural dynamics. The semi-discretized structural equation is a second order ordinary differential equation system,

$M\ddot{u} + C\dot{u} + f^{\textrm{int}}(u) = f^{\textrm{ext}} \,$

here $M$ is the mass matrix, $C$ is the damping matrix, $f^{\textrm{int}}$ and $f^{\textrm{ext}}$ are internal force per unit displacement and external forces, respectively.

Using the extended mean value theorem, the Newmark-$\beta$ method states that the first time derivative (velocity in the equation of motion) can be solved as,

$$\dot{u}_{n+1}=\dot{u}_n+ \Delta t~\ddot{u}_\gamma \,$$

where

$$\ddot{u}_\gamma = (1 - \gamma)\ddot{u}_n + \gamma \ddot{u}_{n+1}~~~~0\leq \gamma \leq 1$$

therefore

$$\dot{u}_{n+1}=\dot{u}_n + (1 - \gamma) \Delta t~\ddot{u}_n + \gamma \Delta t~\ddot{u}_{n+1}.$$

Because acceleration also varies with time, however, the extended mean value theorem must also be extended to the second time derivative to obtain the correct displacement. Thus,

$$u_{n+1}=u_n + \Delta t~\dot{u}_n+\begin{matrix} \frac 1 2 \end{matrix} \Delta t^2~\ddot{u}_\beta$$

where again

$$\ddot{u}_\beta = (1 - 2\beta)\ddot{u}_n + 2\beta\ddot{u}_{n+1}~~~~0\leq 2\beta\leq 1$$

The discretized structural equation becomes

$$\begin{aligned}
&\dot{u}_{n+1}=\dot{u}_n + (1 - \gamma) \Delta t~\ddot{u}_n + \gamma \Delta t~\ddot{u}_{n+1}\\
&u_{n+1}=u_n + \Delta t~\dot{u}_n + \frac{\Delta t^2}{2}\left((1 - 2\beta)\ddot{u}_n + 2\beta\ddot{u}_{n+1}\right)\\
&M\ddot{u}_{n+1} + C\dot{u}_{n+1} + f^{\textrm{int}}(u_{n+1}) = f_{n+1}^{\textrm{ext}} \,
\end{aligned}$$

Explicit central difference scheme is obtained by setting $\gamma=0.5$ and $\beta=0$

Average constant acceleration (Middle point rule) is obtained by setting $\gamma=0.5$ and $\beta=0.25$

== Stability Analysis ==
A time-integration scheme is said to be stable if there exists an integration time-step $\Delta t_0 > 0$ so that for any $\Delta t \in (0, \Delta t_0]$, a finite variation of the state vector $q_n$ at time $t_n$ induces only a non-increasing variation of the state-vector $q_{n+1}$ calculated at a subsequent time $t_{n+1}$. Assume the time-integration scheme is

$q_{n+1} = A(\Delta t) q_n + g_{n+1}(\Delta t)$

The linear stability is equivalent to $\rho(A(\Delta t)) \leq 1$, here $\rho(A(\Delta t))$ is the spectral radius of the update matrix $A(\Delta t)$.

For the linear structural equation

$M\ddot{u} + C\dot{u} + K u = f^{\textrm{ext}} \,$

here $K$ is the stiffness matrix. Let $q_n = [\dot{u}_n, u_n]$, the update matrix is $A = H_1^{-1}H_0$, and

$$\begin{aligned}
H_1 = \begin{bmatrix}
M + \gamma\Delta tC & \gamma \Delta t K\\
\beta \Delta t^2 C & M + \beta\Delta t^2 K
\end{bmatrix}\qquad
H_0 = \begin{bmatrix}
M - (1-\gamma)\Delta tC & -(1 -\gamma) \Delta t K\\
-(\frac{1}{2} - \beta) \Delta t^2 C +\Delta t M & M - (\frac{1}{2} - \beta)\Delta t^2 K
\end{bmatrix}
\end{aligned}$$

For undamped case ($C = 0$), the update matrix can be decoupled by introducing the eigenmodes $u = e^{i \omega_i t} x_i$ of the structural system, which are solved by the generalized eigenvalue problem

$\omega^2 M x = K x \,$

For each eigenmode, the update matrix becomes

$$\begin{aligned}
H_1 = \begin{bmatrix}
1  & \gamma \Delta t \omega_i^2\\
0 & 1 + \beta\Delta t^2 \omega_i^2
\end{bmatrix}\qquad
H_0 = \begin{bmatrix}
1  & -(1 -\gamma) \Delta t \omega_i^2\\
\Delta t  & 1 - (\frac{1}{2} - \beta)\Delta t^2 \omega_i^2
\end{bmatrix}
\end{aligned}$$

The characteristic equation of the update matrix is

$\lambda^2 - \left(2 - (\gamma + \frac{1}{2})\eta_i^2\right)\lambda + 1 - (\gamma - \frac{1}{2})\eta_i^2 = 0 \,\qquad \eta_i^2 = \frac{\omega_i^2\Delta t^2}{1 + \beta\omega_i^2\Delta t^2}$

As for the stability, we have

Explicit central difference scheme ($\gamma=0.5$ and $\beta=0$) is stable when $\omega \Delta t \leq 2$.

Average constant acceleration (Middle point rule) ($\gamma=0.5$ and $\beta=0.25$) is unconditionally stable.
