= Stephen Glaister =

Stephen Glaister CBE (born 21 June 1946) is Emeritus Professor of Transport and Infrastructure at the Department of Civil & Environmental Engineering, Imperial College London, where he was also director of the Railway Technology Strategy Centre.

He was chair of the Office of Rail and Road from early 2016 until 31 December 2018. He remained a member of the ORR Board until 2020.

He is a former board member of Transport for London and former director of the RAC Foundation.

He is a fellow of the Institution of Civil Engineers and has been an advisor to many transport-related organisations and committees since the late 1970s. He has been cited as an expert on transport policy.

== Professional life ==
Glaister has, amongst other things, been: the director of the Railway Technology Strategy Centre; a board member of Transport for London (2000 to 2008); and director of the RAC Foundation (2008 to 2015).

He was first appointed the Chair of the Office of Rail and Road in March 2015, a position he was most recently reappointed to in January 2018.

He has published widely on transport matters and was appointed a CBE for services to public transport in 1998. He has also published regarding the regulation of the water and gas industries.

=== Other roles ===
- Member, Joint Science Research Council/Social Science Research Council Transport Committee (1978 – 1980)
- Member, UK government first Advisory Committee on Trunk Road Assessment (1977 – 1981)
- Editor, Economica (1979 – 1982)
- Specialist Adviser to the Parliamentary Select committee on Transport (1981-1983, 1988,1990)
- Non-executive Board member, London Regional Transport (1984 – 1993)
- Economic advisor, British Rail Policy Unit and InterCity strategy (1980 – 1993)
- Managing Editor, Journal of Transport Economics and Policy (1987 – 1999)
- Member, Independent Review of Road Charging Options for London (ROCOL) (1998 – 2000)
- Economic Advisor to the Rail Regulator (1993 – 2001)
- Economic Advisor, Office of Gas Supply (1996 – 2002)
- Advisor to Buses sub-group, Commission for Integrated Transport (1999 – 2003)
- Member, steering group for the Department of Transport's National Road Pricing Feasibility Study (2003 – 2004)
- Member, HS2 Analytical Challenge Panel (2011)
- Co-chair, Transport Safety Commission (2013)
