= Stephen Mitchell Dixon =

Irish civil engineer (1866–1940)

- Born: 1866; Dublin, Ireland
- Died: 25 March 1940 (aged 73–74); Nice, France
- Education: Trinity College Dublin

Stephen Mitchell Dixon OBE (1866 – 25 March 1940), was an Irish civil engineer.

== Life ==
Stephen Mitchell Dixon was born in 1866, in Dublin. He attended Trinity College Dublin (TCD), studying experimental science. In the engineering school of TCD he worked as a demonstrator to Dr W.A. Trail. While at TCD, he was a friend and neighbour of William Henry Stanley Monck.

He worked for the Portrush Electric Railway Company. The railway connected Portrush with the Giant's Causeway, and was the first to be powered by hydroelectricity. During World War I, Dixon worked with the Ministry of Munitions, serving with the Royal Engineers in France.

Dixon was the chair of engineering in a number of institutions, including as the inaugural chair at University of New Brunswick in Nova Scotia, and later Dalhousie University, University of Birmingham and Imperial College London. While in Birmingham, he studied wire ropes and supports for the mining industry, and was appointed to the Safety in Mines Research Board in 1923. He was a member of the Institution of Civil Engineers, and served on the British Standards Committee. He was awarded the Telford Premium of the Institution of Civil Engineers for his work on measuring the flow of the River Severn. He retired from Imperial College in 1933. He was appointed an Officer of the Order of the British Empire (OBE) in the 1937 New Year Honours. He retired to the South of France in the same year.

He died in Nice on 25 March 1940. An obituary was published in The Engineer.
