= Sarma method =

The Sarma method is a method used primarily to assess the stability of soil slopes under seismic conditions. Using appropriate assumptions the method can also be employed for static slope stability analysis. It was proposed by Sarada K. Sarma in the early 1970s as an improvement over the other conventional methods of analysis which had adopted numerous simplifying assumptions.

== History ==
Sarma worked in the area of seismic analysis of earth dams under Ambraseys at Imperial College for his doctoral studies in the mid 1960s. The methods for seismic analysis of dams available at that time were based on the Limit Equilibrium approach and were restricted to planar or circular failures surfaces adopting several assumptions regarding force and moment equilibrium (usually satisfying one of the two) and about the magnitude of the forces (such as interslice forces being equal to zero).

Sarma looked into the various available methods of analysis and developed a new method for analysis in seismic conditions and calculating the permanent displacements due to strong shaking. His method was published in the 1970s (the very first publication was in 1973 and later improvements came in 1975 and 1979).

== Method ==
=== Assumptions ===
The method satisfies all conditions of equilibrium, (i.e. horizontal and vertical force equilibrium and moment equilibrium for each slice). It may be applied to any shape of slip surface as the slip surfaces are not assumed to be vertical, but they may be inclined. It is assumed that magnitudes of vertical side forces follow prescribed patterns. For n slices (or wedges), there are 3n equations and 3n unknowns, and therefore it statically determinate without the need of any further additional assumptions.

=== Advantages ===
The Sarma method is called an advanced and rigorous method of static and seismic slope stability analysis. It is called advanced because it can take account of non-circular failure surfaces. Also, the multi-wedge approach allows for non-vertical slices and irregular slope geometry. It is called a rigorous method because it can satisfy all the three conditions of equilibrium, horizontal and vertical forces and moments. The Sarma method is nowadays used as a verification to finite element programs (also FE limit analysis) and it is the standard method used for seismic analysis.

=== Use ===
The method is used mainly for two purposes, to analyse earth slopes and earth dams. When used to analyse seismic slope stability it can provide the factor of safety against failure for a given earthquake load, i.e. horizontal seismic force or acceleration (critical acceleration). Besides, it can provide the required earthquake load (force or acceleration) for which a given slope will fail, i.e. the factor of safety will be equal to 1.

When the method is used in the analysis of earth dams (i.e. the slopes of the dam faces), the results of the analysis, i.e. the critical acceleration is used in the Newmark's sliding block analysis in order to calculate the induced permanent displacements. This follows the assumption that displacements will result if the earthquake induced accelerations exceed the value of the critical acceleration for stability.

== Accuracy ==
=== General acceptance ===
The Sarma method has been extensively used in seismic analysis software for many years and has been the standard practice until recently for seismic slope stability for many years (similar to the Mononobe–Okabe method for retaining walls). Its accuracy has been verified by various researchers and it has been proved to yield results quite similar to the modern safe Lower Bound numerical stability Limit Analysis methods (e.g. the 51st Rankine Lecture).

=== Modern alternatives ===
However, nowadays modern numerical analysis software employing usually the finite element, finite difference and boundary element methods are more widely used for special case studies. Particular attention has been recently given to the finite element method which can provide very accurate results through the release of several assumptions usually adopted by the conventional methods of analysis. Special boundary conditions and constitutive laws can model the case in a more realistic fashion.

== See also ==
- Earthquake engineering
- Finite element method
- Slope stability analysis

== Bibliography ==
- Kramer, S. L. (1996) Geotechnical Earthquake Engineering. Prentice Hall, New Jersey.
