= Thomas Paulay =

Hungarian-New Zealand earthquake engineer

- Born: 26 May 1923; Sopron, Hungary
- Died: 28 June 2009 (aged 86); Christchurch, New Zealand
- Education: University of Canterbury
- Scientific career
- Thesis: The coupling of shear walls. (1969)

Thomas Paulay OBE OoM (26 May 1923 – 28 June 2009) was a Hungarian-New Zealand earthquake engineer.

== Academic career ==
Trained as chemical engineer, after fleeing Hungary to West Germany, Paulay arrived in New Zealand in 1951, and became a naturalised New Zealand citizen in 1957. After a PhD 'The coupling of shear walls', in 1961, he joined the Department of Civil Engineering at the University of Canterbury, where he spent many years studying the seismic behaviour and design of structures.

In the 1986 Queen's Birthday Honours, Paulay was appointed an Officer of the Order of the British Empire, for services to civil engineering.

Paulay delivered the fourth Mallet–Milne memorial lecture for the Society for Earthquake and Civil Engineering Dynamics, in London in 1993.

== Selected works ==
- Seismic design of reinforced concrete and masonry buildings, ISBN 0471549150
- Simplicity and confidence in seismic design, ISBN 047194310X
- Reinforced concrete structures, ISBN 0471659177
