= Nathan M. Newmark =

American structural engineer and academic (1910–1981)

Nathan Mortimore Newmark
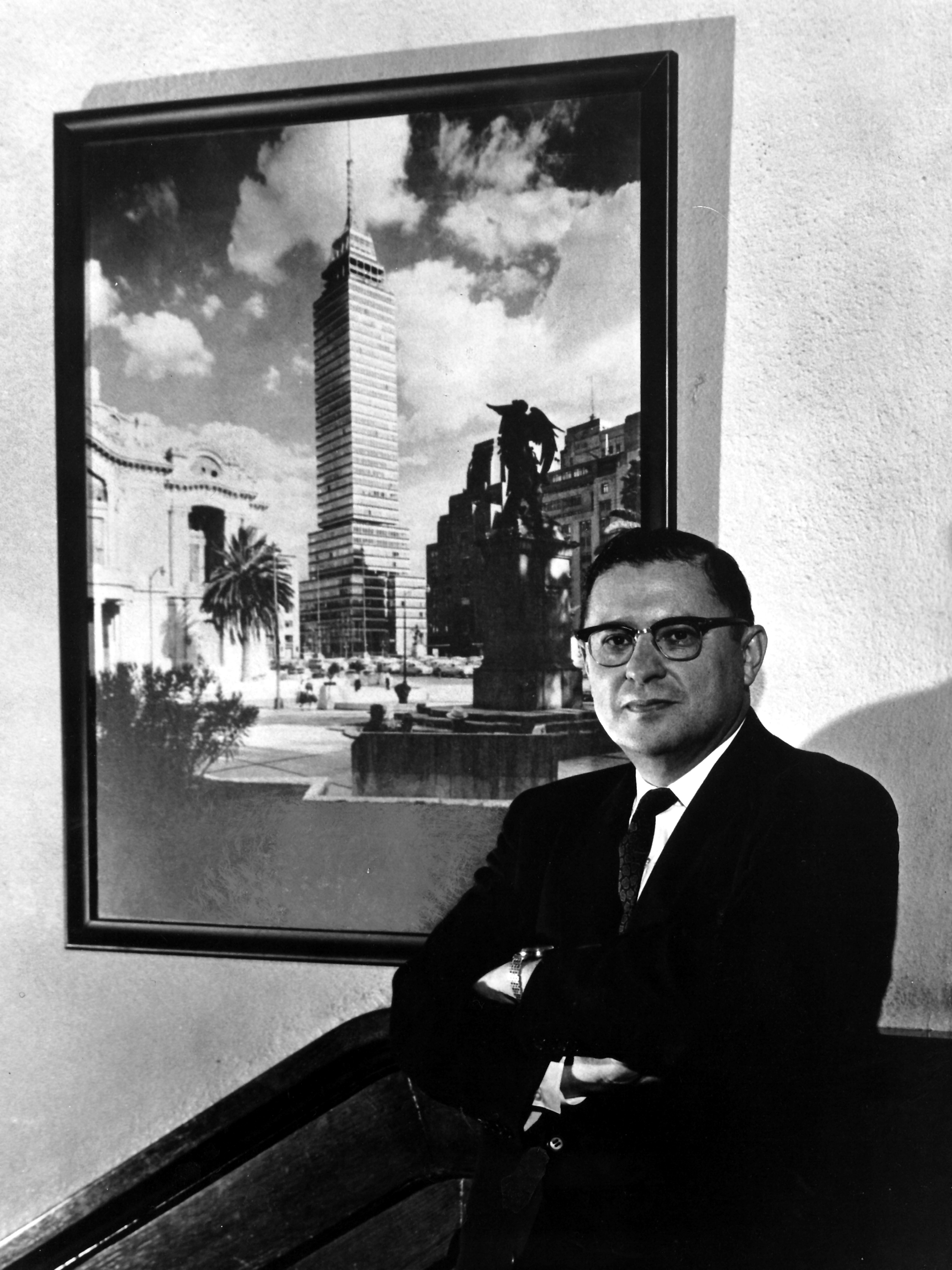
- Born: September 22, 1910; Plainfield, New Jersey, United States
- Died: January 25, 1981 (aged 70)
- Education: Rutgers University; University of Illinois at Urbana–Champaign
- Spouse: Anne Cohen
- Parent(s): Abraham and Mollie Newmark
- Engineering career
- Discipline: Structural engineer, civil engineer
- Institutions: American Society of Civil Engineers; American Academy of Arts and Sciences; Institution of Structural Engineers
- Projects: Torre Latinoamericana; Trans-Alaska Pipeline
- Significant design: ILLIAC II
- Significant advance: Newmark-beta method of numerical integration, Newmark's sliding block method of analysis of soil slopes
- Awards: ACI Wason Medal for Most Meritorious Paper; IStructE Gold Medal; National Medal of Science (1968); John Fritz Medal (1979)

Nathan Mortimore Newmark (September 22, 1910 – January 25, 1981) was an American structural engineer and academic, widely regarded as one of the founding fathers of earthquake engineering. He was awarded the National Medal of Science for Engineering.

== Early life ==
Newmark was born in Plainfield, New Jersey to a Jewish couple, Abraham and Mollie Newmark. After receiving his early education in North Carolina and New Jersey, he attended Rutgers University, graduating in 1930 with high honors and special honors in civil engineering. He married Anne Cohen in 1931.

Newmark then attended graduate school at the University of Illinois at Urbana–Champaign, where he worked under Hardy Cross, Harold M. Westergaard, and Frank E. Richart.

In 1932, he received an M.S. degree and in 1934, a Ph.D. degree for his thesis titled Interaction between rib and superstructure in concrete arch bridges, in civil engineering from the University of Illinois at Urbana–Champaign.

== Career ==
After graduating from UIUC, Newmark held several prestigious positions within the department. He became Research Professor of Civil Engineering in 1943 and served as Chairman of the university's Digital Computer Laboratory from 1947 to 1957. In 1956, he was appointed head of the Civil Engineering Department, a position he held until 1973. Newmark also held many important leadership roles and earned the distinction of the longest tenure on the University Research Board. He continued teaching as a professor until his retirement with a rank of professor emeritus. Under his leadership, University of Illinois at Urbana–Champaign's civil engineering program soared to new heights. The civil engineering laboratory on campus now bears his name.

Newmark was the advisor or coadvisor of the following students who completed their Ph.D. in Civil Engineering, Graduate College, University of Illinois at Urbana–Champaign:

- Appleton, J. H., (1959)
- Au, T., (1951)
- Auld, H. E., (1967)
- Austin, W. J., (1949)
- Badir, M., (1948)
- Brooks, J. A., (1955)
- Bultmann, E. H., Jr., (1968)
- Bustamante, J. I., (1964)
- Chan, S. P., (1953)
- Chen, T. Y., (1954)
- Collins, R. A., (1958)
- Cowan, B. M., (1968)
- Cox, H. L., (1953)
- Daigh, J. D., (1957)
- D'Appolonia, E., (1948)
- Dorris, A. F., (1965)
- Duberg, J. E., (1948)
- Egger, W., Jr., (1960)
- Eppink, R. T., (1960)
- Fisher, W. E., (1962)
- Francy, W. J., (1954)
- Friedericy, J. A., (1960)
- Fuller, J. R., (1955)
- Fulton, R. E., (1960)
- Gaus, M. P., (1959)
- Gossard, M. L., (1949)
- Gurfinkel, G. R., (1966)
- Hall, W. J., (1954)
- Haltiwanger, J. D., (1957)
- Hammer, J. G., (1954)
- Hanley, J. T., (1963)
- Harper, G. N., (1963)
- Harris, L. A., (1954)
- Heer, J. E., Jr., (1965)
- Howland, F. L., (1955)
- Iten, R. M., (1968)
- Jennings, R. L., (1964)
- Jester, G. E., (1968)
- Johnson, S. W., (1964)
- Laupa, A., (1953)
- Lee, D. H., (1951)
- Lee, Z. K., (1950)
- Lemcoe, M. M., (1957)
- Lycan, D. L., (1960)
- Massard, J. M., (1955)
- Mayerjak, R. J., (1955)
- McDonough, G. F., Jr., (1959)
- Melin, J. W., (1961)
- Merritt, J. L., Jr., (1958)
- Murtha, J. P., (1961)
- Nakhata, T., (1973)
- Pan, S. L., (1951)
- Patterson, G. J., (1969)
- Paul, S. L., (1963)
- Pinckert, R. E., (1966)
- Radler, C. M., (1963)
- Randall, P. N., (1948)
- Richart, F. E., Jr., (1948)
- Robinson, A. R., (1956)
- Rosenblueth, E., (1951)
- Schmidt, R., (1956)
- Schnobrich, W. C., (1962)
- Schutz, F. W., Jr., (1952)
- Shaw, W. A., (1962)
- Siess, C. P., (1948)
- Smith, R. H., (1958)
- Stallmeyer, J. E., (1953)
- Stephens, H. E., (1954)
- Stockdale, W. K., (1959)
- Sutcliffe, S., (1960)
- Thibodeaux, M. h., (1958)
- Townsley, E. S., (1959)
- Tung, C. P. C., (1951)
- Untrauer, R. E., (1961)
- Vaughan, R. G., (1966)
- Veletsos, A. S., (1953)
- Wah, T., (1953)
- Walls, W. A., (1960)
- Wang, C. K., (1945)
- Weggel, J. R., (1968)
- Wei, C. F., (1951)
- Weil, N. A., (1952)
- Whipple, C. R., (1961)
- Wu, G. S., (1954)
- Wu, T. S., (1952)
- Yao, W. M., (1957)
- Yegian, S., (1956)
- Yoshihara, T., (1963)
- Yuan, H. K., (1951)
- Zwoyer, E. M., (1953)

== Achievements ==
During World War II, Newmark consulted for the National Defense Research Committee and the Office of Scientific Research and Development, for which in 1948, he received the President's Certificate of Merit. He served on numerous Department of Defense boards and panels, with major contributions to the Minute Man and MX missile systems.

In 1959, Newmark introduced what became known as the Newmark-beta method of numerical integration, used to solve differential equations. The method is still widely used in numerical evaluation of the dynamic response of structures and solids, such as in Finite element analysis. He later helped to develop the first digital computers, the ILLIAC II, which was one of the first transistorized computers. It was also designed to use transistors that were not even invented yet. The ILLIAC-II eventually led to the development of computer software for engineering.

Another of Newmark's achievements was the Torre Latinoamericana (Latin American Tower) in Mexico City, Mexico, which was the tallest building in Mexico City until 1984. Newmark served as the consulting engineer on the project. He designed the building to be supported by the muddy soil underneath the structure and to withstand earthquakes. The design was put to the test in 1957 when an earthquake struck the city, and again during the stronger earthquake of 1985. The Torre Latinoamericana withstood the quakes and still stands today as a testament to progress in earthquake engineering.

Newmark also developed the seismic design criteria for other large projects including the Bay Area Rapid Transit system, Trans-Alaska Pipeline System, the proposed Alaskan Natural Gas Pipeline, and approximately 70 nuclear power plants.

Throughout his career, Newmark developed a simple, yet powerful and widely used method for analyzing complex structural components and assemblies under a variety of conditions of loading and for calculating the stresses and deformations in soil beneath foundations. He also was an engineer on the construction of the Trans-Alaska Pipeline. In the 1970s, during an energy crisis marled by high unemployment and inflation, the United States sought to better conserve and make use of its natural resources. After oil was discovered in Alaska, a design was needed to transport it quickly and efficiently down to the refineries.

The Alaskan terrain presented significant challenges for a conventional underground pipeline, especially near active fault lines. Newmark had done numerous studies on the effects of earthquakes on structures, making him particularly well qualified to design pipeline sections in seismically active regions.

Newmark also made significant contributions to geotechnical engineering. He developed a new method, named after him (Newmark's sliding block method) of calculating displacements in earth dams and slopes caused by earthquakes. His work was recognized with an invitation to deliver the 5th Rankine Lecture of the British Geotechnical Association, entitled Effects of earthquakes on dams and embankments.

== Hardy Cross ==
Hardy Cross, under whom Newmark worked at the University of Illinois in Urbana, developed the moment distribution method. This method enabled designers to calculate statically indeterminate frames of reinforced concrete. Newmark greatly admired Cross; in Cross's book Arches, Continuous Frames, Columns and Conduits, Newmark wrote the introduction, in which he described how much he enjoyed the classes taught by Cross and how they would sometimes walk home together after class, discussing engineering principles.

== Awards and Recognitions ==
The American Concrete Institute awarded Newmark the Wason Medal for Most Meritorious Paper in 1950. In 1964, he contributed to the founding the National Academy of Engineering (NAE), and two years later became a member of National Academy of Sciences (NAS). In 1968, he received the National Medal of Science for Engineering Sciences. He was elected Fellow of the American Academy of Arts and Sciences in 1962, and received the 1979 John Fritz Medal from the American Association of Engineering Societies, along with several other awards.

In 1975, the American Society of Civil Engineers established the Nathan M. Newmark Medal, which is awarded "to a member of the American Society of Civil Engineers who, through contributions in structural mechanics, has helped substantially to strengthen the scientific base of structural engineering."
