= Bulletin of Earthquake Engineering =

- Discipline: Earthquake engineering
- Language: English
- Edited by: A. Ansal

Publication details
- History: 2003-present
- Publisher: Springer Science+Business Media on behalf of the European Association for Earthquake Engineering
- Frequency: Bimonthly
- Impact factor: 4.556 (2021)

Standard abbreviations
- ISO 4: Bull. Earthq. Eng.

Indexing
- ISSN: 1570-761X (print); 1573-1456 (web)
- OCLC no.: 52714323

Links
- Journal homepage; Online archive

The Bulletin of Earthquake Engineering is a bimonthly peer-reviewed scientific journal published by Springer Science+Business Media on behalf of the European Association for Earthquake Engineering. It covers all aspects of earthquake engineering. It was established in 2003 and the editor-in-chief is Atilla Ansal (Ozyegin University).

== Abstracting and indexing ==
This journal is abstracted and indexed in:

- Science Citation Index Expanded
- Scopus
- Inspec
- CSA Illumina
- Academic OneFile
- Aquatic Sciences and Fisheries Abstracts
- Current Contents/Engineering, Computing and Technology
- Engineering Index/Compendex
- GeoArchive
- Geobase
- GeoRef
- VINITI Database RAS

According to the Journal Citation Reports, the journal has a 2020 impact factor of 3.827.
