= RAC Foundation =

- Royal Automobile Club Foundation
- Formation: 1991
- Headquarters: 89-91 Pall Mall, London SW1Y 5HS
- Website: www.racfoundation.org

The RAC Foundation (Royal Automobile Club Foundation for Motoring Limited) is a registered charitable organization in England and Wales. The foundation is a transport policy and research organization. Its total reported gross income for the financial year ending 21 December 2024 was £771.40k.

== History ==
The RAC Foundation was established as a charitable company on 26 April 1991 as the research division of RAC Motoring Services Ltd. After the sale of the company by the Royal Automobile Club in 1999, the Foundation was reconstituted as an independent body, initially funded by subscriptions from former RAC members. Later, the RAC registered as a charity.

== Organization ==
The foundation is governed by a board of six trustees and a Public Policy Committee consisting of fourteen members. As of 2025, Neville Jackson serves as the chair of both the Board of Trustees and the Public Policy Committee. The day-to-day operations have been led by Steve Gooding since May 2015.

== Work ==
The RAC Foundation’s research covers four aspects relating to roads, economics, environment, mobility, and safety. It also publishes datasets, including charts on fuel prices and the uptake of ultra-low-emission vehicles. Alongside its in-house research, the RAC Foundation commissions external contractors to deliver policy analysis.

In 2010 and 2011, the foundation sponsored RAC Brighton in the London Future Car Challenge and published research data on participating low-carbon vehicles.

In 2017, the foundation contributed to Gergely Raccuja's winning entry for the Wolfson Economics Prize. The proposal, entitled “Miles Better”, examined the feasibility of a distance-based road fee to replace fuel duty and Vehicle Excise Duty (VED), as revenue from these duties is expected to decline with the growth of low-emission vehicles.

In June 2018, the Department for Transport announced £480,000 in funding for the foundation to support its Road Collision Investigation Project, which aims to trial a new approach to investigating road casualties.

== Criticism ==
In 2023, New Civil Engineer voiced concerns about a foundation report claiming that “one in 24 UK road bridges are substandard.” Hazel McDonald, chief bridge engineer at Transport Scotland, argued that this phrasing was misleading, as many of the bridges included in the report were safe but not rated to carry the maximum 44-tonne vehicles. Independent consultant Richard Fish also questioned the use of the term “substandard” in this context.

== Publications ==
- Roads and Reality
- The Car in British Society
- Governing and Paying for England’s Roads
- Keeping the Nation Moving
- Fuel for Thought, the What, Why and How of Motoring Taxation
- On the Move: Car and Rail Travel Trends
- Powering Ahead: Future of Low-Carbon Cars and Fuels
- Ploughing On - Winter Resilience Review
- The Car and the Commute
- Graduated Driver Licensing - Mapping the Cost of Young Driver Accidents
- Saving Lives by Lowering Legal Drink-Drive Limit
- Effectiveness of Average Speed Cameras
- Air Quality and Road Transport
- Diesel Scrappage - Could it Work?
- Towards an Accident Investigation Branch for Roads
- New car mileage - analysis of MOT data
