= Geoffrey Eustace Blight =

South African geotechnical engineer

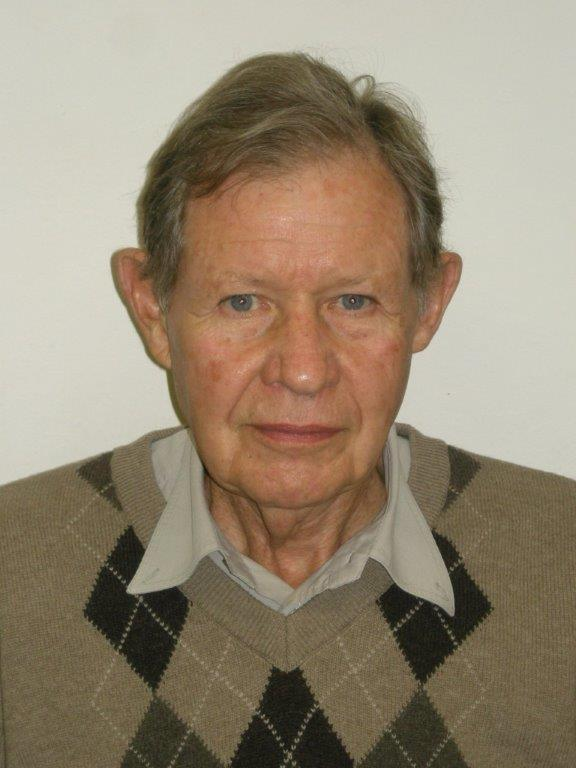
- Born: 30 June 1934; Pietersburg, South Africa
- Died: 7 November 2013 (aged 79); Johannesburg, South Africa
- Education: University of Witwatersrand Imperial College University of London University of Cape Town
- Scientific career
- Doctoral advisor: Professor Alan Bishop

Geoffrey Eustace Blight (30 July 1934 – 7 November 2013) was a professor in the School of Civil Engineering at the University of Witwatersrand (Wits), serving twice as head of department.

For his significant contributions to civil engineering Blight was elected Fellow of the Royal Society of Southern Africa (1991), Honorary Fellow of the South African Institute for Civil Engineers (SAICE) (1997) and Life Member of the American Society of Civil Engineers (ASCE) (2000). In recognition of his work in geotechnical engineering he was the 1997 Rankine Lecturer.

== Background ==
Blight was born in Pietersburg, South Africa, on 30 July 1934 and educated at Benoni High School. He graduated from Wits with a BSc (Eng) in Civil Engineering in 1955.

After spending a short time with the consulting company Kanthack and Partners, Blight returned to Wits to complete his MSc in 1958 on internal stability of filters under the supervision of Jere Jennings.

Following this, he was awarded the Witwatersrand University Council Scholarship to study overseas and elected to do his PhD at Imperial College. Blight investigated the behaviour of partially saturated soils under Professor Alan Bishop, who graduated in 1961. Results from his meticulous laboratory testing are used to this day in calibrating numerical models.

Returning to South Africa, he joined the staff at Wits for two years before joining the National Building Research Institute in Pretoria. Here, Blight was part of a busy team investigating problem soils including dolomites, heaving clays and collapsible soils.

Blight re-joined Wits in 1969. Due to restrictions of his appointment, he diversified his research focus into the study of pavements, alkali-aggregate reaction in concrete, solid waste disposal, pressures in silos and underground ore passes. His focus later returned to soil mechanics with a focus on application to mine tailings, and other industrial and municipal solid waste.

Throughout his career, Blight was an active consultant to major corporations, mining houses, contractors and engineering consultants. Commenting on his consulting work Blight said, "This is probably one of the reasons why my studies have been well received, partly because they have been based on practical engineering problems."

Setting higher doctoral degrees as research goals, Professor Blight was awarded a DSc(Eng) from University of London in 1975, a DSc(Eng) from Wits in 1985, a DSc(Eng) from University of Cape Town in 1993 and another DSc(Eng) from Wits in 2001. He was also awarded an Honorary Doctorate in Engineering by Wits in 2009. He completed his final textbook Unsaturated Soil Mechanics in Geotechnical Practice a few days before he died on 7 November 2013. He was married to Rhona and had three daughters, and a son.

== Contributions ==
Blight's many papers on the behavior of tailings have contributed significantly to the safe disposal of mine waste in South Africa. His works include his influential textbook Geotechnical Engineering for Mine Waste Storage Facilities and the Guideline to Design and Construction of Mine Waste Disposal Systems published by the Chamber of Mines, South Africa.

He also contributed to improving municipal solid waste disposal through his work on Minimum Standards for Waste Disposal by Landfill, published by the Department of Water Affairs and Forestry and co-authoring the International Solid Waste Association's paper on Application of Graded Standards to Landfilling in Developing Countries.

He also carried out extensive research on unsaturated soils, with particular emphasis on residual soils. His many papers on unsaturated soil mechanics, formed the basis to Unsaturated Soil Mechanics in Geotechnical Practice. Blight also co-edited Mechanics of Residual Soils with E.C. Leong. Blight served technical committees of the International Society for Soil Mechanics and Geotechnical Engineering (ISSMGE) on unsaturated soils and residual soils (former chairman). In recognition of his work on unsaturated soils, the Blight Lecture is delivered at the International Conference on Soil Mechanics and Geotechnical Engineering (ICSMGE) held every 4 years.

Another area he contributed to was material science and material handling. His work on concrete science is contained in the textbook Alkali-aggregate Reaction and Structural Damage to Concrete: Engineering Assessment, Repair and Management, which was co-authored with Mark Alexander. His work on material handling is contained in Assessing Loads on Silos and Other Bulk Storage Structures.

== Awards ==
Blight received numerous awards including the ASCE's J James Croes Gold Medal for innovation in research (1975), A-grade researcher status by the South African Foundation for Research Development (1989-2002), Distinguished Research Award by SAICE (1989), the Telford Premium by the UK Institution of Civil Engineers (ICE) (1991), delivering the Rankine Lecture to the British Geotechnical Society (1997), South African Geotechnical Gold Medal by SAICE (1997), the Institute for Waste Management of Southern Africa President's Award for exceptional service to the waste management profession (2002) and a commendation from the Italian National Group for Prevention of Hydrogeologic Hazards for research into flow failures of tailings dams (2003).

In 1991, he was elected as a Fellow of the Royal Society of Southern Africa. Also in 1991, he was a Founder Member of the South African Academy of Science and the South African Engineering Academy. SAICE elected him an Honorary Fellow in 1997 and he was made a Life Member of the ASCE in 2000.
