= Lidija Zdravković =

Serbian and British geotechnical engineer

Lidija Zdravković is a Serbian and British civil engineer who is Professor of Computational Geomechanics and Head of Geotechnics in the Department of Civil and Environmental Engineering of Imperial College London. Her research involves the use of the finite element method in geotechnical engineering, the study of the mechanical behavior of soil and rock in engineering applications. She is a coauthor of the two-volume textbook Finite Element Analysis in Geotechnical Engineering.

== Education and career ==
Zdravković studied civil engineering at the University of Belgrade, graduating in 1988 and continuing to teach at the same university for the following four years. She joined Imperial College London in 1992 as a graduate student, and completed her PhD there in 1996. Her doctoral dissertation, The stress-strain-strength an isotropy of a granular medium under general stress conditions, was supervised by Richard Jardine. She remained at Imperial as academic staff.

== Book ==
Zdravković is coauthor of:

- Finite Element Analysis in Geotechnical Engineering, Vol. I: Theory (with David M. Potts, Thomas Telford Publishing, 1999)
- Finite Element Analysis in Geotechnical Engineering, Vol. II: Application (with David M. Potts, Thomas Telford Publishing, 2001)

== Recognition ==
Zdravković and her coauthors David M. Potts and David W. Hight were the 2002 recipients of the Telford Medal of the Institution of Civil Engineers.

Zdravković was the 2013 Géotechnique Lecturer and the 2024 Rankine Lecturer of the British Geotechnical Association.

In 2026 she was elected a Fellow of the Royal Academy of Engineering.
