= Robert Mair, Baron Mair =

English academic and politician

Professor The Right Honourable The Lord Mair CBE FRS FICE FREng
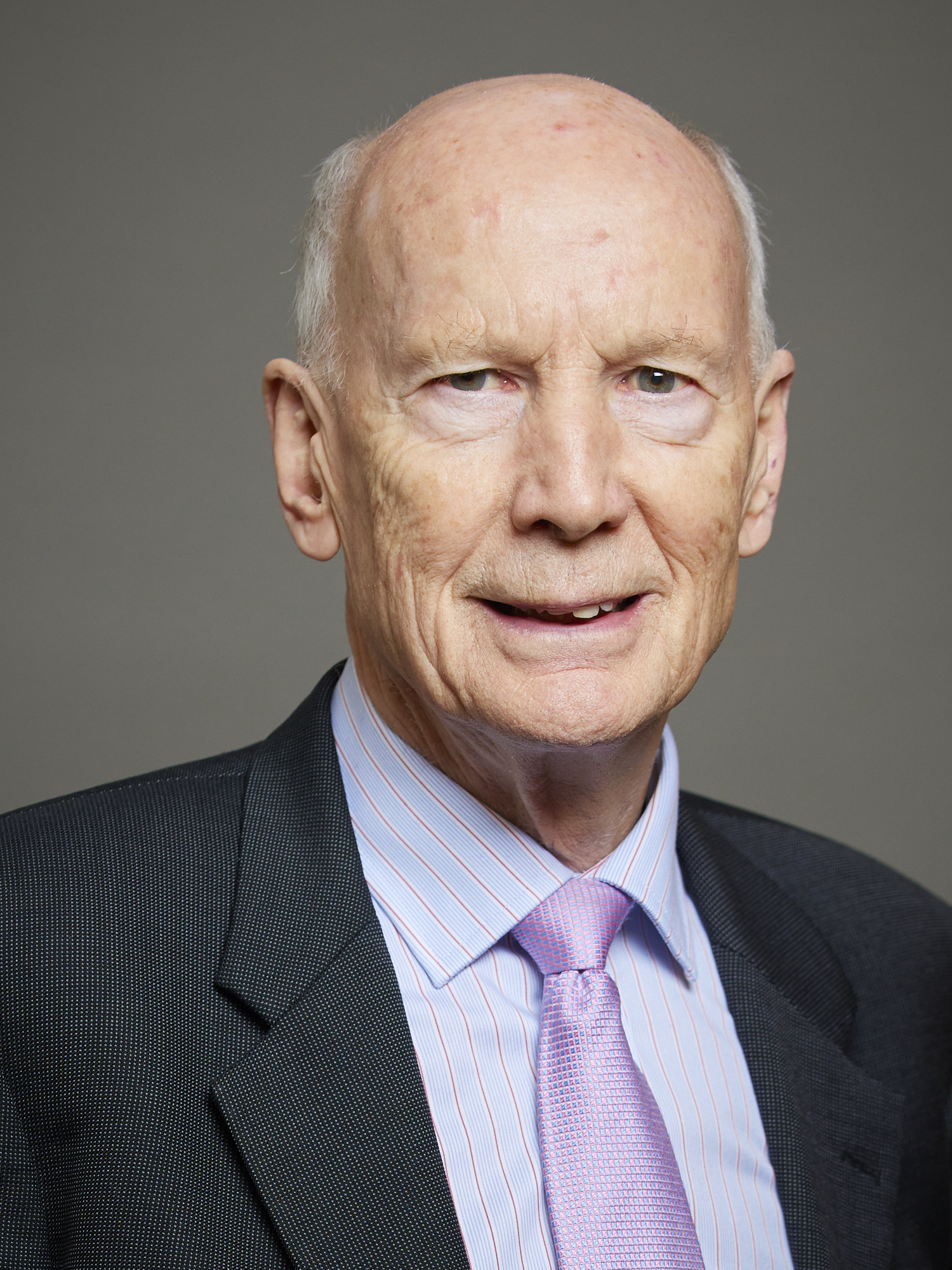
- Lord Mair's official parliamentary photo
- Born: 20 April 1950 (age 76)
- Known for: Jubilee Line Extension
- Awards: Fellow of the Royal Society; Commander of the Order of the British Empire

Academic background
- Education: Clare College, Cambridge
- Thesis: Centrifugal modelling of tunnel construction in soft clay (1979)
- Doctoral advisor: Andrew N. Schofield

Academic work
- Discipline: Geotechnical engineering Tunnel design & construction
- Institutions: University of Cambridge; Institution of Civil Engineers; Crossrail; Laing O'Rourke; Scott Wilson Group; The Leys School

Member of the House of Lords
- Lord Temporal
- Life peerage 29 October 2015
- Website: www.eng.cam.ac.uk/~rjm50

Robert James Mair, Baron Mair (born 20 April 1950) is a geotechnical engineer and Emeritus Sir Kirby Laing Professor of Civil Engineering at the University of Cambridge. He is the Founding Head of the Cambridge Centre for Smart Infrastructure and Construction (CSIC). He was Master of Jesus College, Cambridge, from 2001 to 2011 and a fellow of St John's College, Cambridge, from 1998 to 2001. In 2014 he was elected a vice president of the Institution of Civil Engineers and on 1 November 2017 became the Institution's president for 2017–2018, its 200th anniversary year. He was appointed an independent crossbencher in the House of Lords in 2015 where he has been active on matters relating to infrastructure, science and technology, and education. He was a member of its Select Committee on Science and Technology for four years, and has also been a member of Select Committees on Assessment and Management of Risk, and Education and Skills; he is presently Chair of the Science and Technology Committee.

== Education ==
The son of William Austyn Mair, Francis Mond Professor of Aeronautical Engineering at the University of Cambridge (1952–1983), Mair was educated at St Faith's and The Leys School in Cambridge and went on to study Engineering at Clare College, Cambridge, graduating in 1972, and returned from industry in 1976 to gain a PhD degree in 1979.

== Career ==
Lord Mair is an authority on geotechnical engineering, which is the application of the science of soil and rock mechanics, engineering geology and other related disciplines to civil engineering design and construction. His particular speciality is the design and construction of tunnels. His expertise has been sought throughout the world on numerous civil engineering projects involving soft ground tunnelling, retaining structures, deep excavations and foundations.

Prior to his appointment to a Chair at Cambridge in 1998, he worked full-time in industry for 27 years. He was Principal Engineer for Scott Wilson Kirkpatrick, working in their London and Hong Kong offices, 1971–1983; he was seconded to the University of Cambridge, 1976–1979 to research tunnelling in soft ground.

In 1983 he founded the Geotechnical Consulting Group, an international consulting company based in London, with co-founders Dr David Hight and the late Professor Peter Vaughan. He has been responsible for advising on geotechnical and tunnelling aspects of numerous major engineering projects world-wide. In the UK he advised on the design and construction of the Jubilee Line Extension for London Underground, the Channel Tunnel Rail Link (now HS1), Crossrail (now the Elizabeth Line) and HS2 projects. He is known for pioneering compensation grouting as a novel technique for controlling settlement of structures during tunnel construction firstly on the Waterloo Escalator Tunnel Project. The technique was then successfully applied on the Jubilee Line Extension project for the protection of many historic buildings, including the Big Ben clock tower at the Palace of Westminster. Compensation grouting was also applied on construction of the Elizabeth Line (formerly Crossrail) and is now widely used around the world. International projects on which he has advised have included railway and metro tunnels in Amsterdam, Athens, Barcelona, Bologna, Florence, Hong Kong, Istanbul, Rome, Singapore and Warsaw, and motorway tunnels in Bolu, Turkey. He was a member of the French Government Commission of Enquiry into the Collapse of the Toulon Tunnel, 1997. From 2007 to 2014 he was Co-Chairman of the Singapore Government's International Advisory Board on design and construction aspects of all its underground metro and road tunnels.

Lord Mair was Chairman of the Royal Society/Royal Academy of Engineering Report on Review of Shale Gas and Hydraulic Fracturing, published in 2012. He was a member of the Engineering Expert Panel for Crossrail (now the Elizabeth Line) and is currently performing a similar role for HS2. Following the tragic train derailment in Scotland in August 2020, he was appointed Chair of the Task Force Review of Network Rail's Earthworks Management; the report was published in February 2021. In 2022, he was Chair of the Technical Review Panel appointed by EDF to review the technical risks and opportunities relating to marine works tunnel shaft connections for Hinkley Point C nuclear power station. He has recently chaired similar independent reviews of aspects of Sizewell C nuclear power station, appointed by EDF.

Persuaded to return to academia in 1998, when he was appointed to a Chair in Engineering at the University of Cambridge, he championed industry-focused research and grew the Geotechnical and Environmental Research Group into one of the largest in its field in the world. He was the Sir Kirby Laing Professor of Civil Engineering 2011–2017 and was Head of Civil Engineering 1999–2016.

He led the establishment in 2010 of the Laing O'Rourke Centre for Construction Engineering and Technology at Cambridge, a partnership between the University of Cambridge and Laing O’Rourke – the UK's largest private construction company – to set up a multi-disciplinary academic centre to leverage innovative thinking to benefit the construction industry.

Lord Mair is Founding Head of the Centre for Smart Infrastructure and Construction (CSIC) at the University of Cambridge, an Innovation and Knowledge Centre funded by the Engineering and Physical Sciences Research Council (EPSRC) and Innovate UK and industry to a total value of £22m. CSIC specialises in sensor technologies and data analysis models, working with industry and partner organisations to accelerate implementation of research outputs to transform infrastructure through smarter information. Its work involves developing new technologies for streamlining construction and for condition assessment and monitoring of ageing infrastructure, with a focus on the development of wireless sensor networks, MEMS technologies and new fibre optic sensing technology. CSIC has around 50 industry partners and has deployed innovative sensor technologies (notably fibre optics and wireless sensors) on around 100 different sites.

In 2015 he was responsible for securing £18m Government funding for 50 per cent of the cost of the new Civil Engineering Building on the West Cambridge site of the Engineering Department as part of the UK Collaboratorium on Research on Infrastructure and Cities (UKCRIC) initiative. The £38m building, which opened in 2019, contains the National Research Facility for Infrastructure Sensing (NRFIS).

In 2020, Mair was appointed chair of the board at One CAM, the company responsible for delivering the Cambridgeshire Autonomous Metro.

== Honours and awards ==
Mair was elected a Fellow of the Institution of Civil Engineers (FICE) in 1990, a Fellow of the Royal Academy of Engineering (FREng) in 1992, and a Fellow of the Royal Society (FRS) in 2007. He delivered the 46th Rankine Lecture of the British Geotechnical Association in 2006, and was appointed Commander of the Order of the British Empire (CBE) in the 2010 New Year Honours. Mair has been awarded numerous research grants by the Engineering and Physical Sciences Research Council (EPSRC). He was awarded the Institution of Civil Engineers Gold Medal in 2004, their President's Medal in 2013 and their Crampton Prize in 2006 and 2015. He has given many invited lectures around the world, including the flagship annual Hinton Lecture of the Royal Academy of Engineering in 2015 titled 'Creating underground infrastructure – the role of geotechnical engineering'.

He has been awarded Honorary DSc degrees by the Universities of Nottingham and Leeds and by Imperial College, London. On 29 October 2015, he was created a life peer with the title Baron Mair, of Cambridge in the County of Cambridgeshire.

In February 2019, Mair was elected a foreign member of the US National Academy of Engineering for contributions to underground construction and smart infrastructure and for leadership in government, engineering practice, research, and education.

Academic offices
Preceded by David Crighton	Master of Jesus College, Cambridge; 2001–2011	Succeeded by Ian White
Professional and academic associations
Preceded by Tim Broyd	President of the Institution of Civil Engineers; November 2017 – November 2018	Succeeded by Andrew Wyllie
Orders of precedence in the United Kingdom
Preceded by The Lord Watts	Gentlemen; Baron Mair	Followed by The Lord Bird
