= Kenneth Knight =

South African engineer and academic

- Born: 23 March 1922; Durban, South Africa
- Died: 2 November 2018 (aged 96); Durban, South Africa
- Education: University of Witwatersrand
- Scientific career
- Thesis: The collapse structure of sandy sub-soils on wetting
- Doctoral advisor: Jeremiah Edmund Bowden Jennings

Kenneth "KK" Knight (23 March 1922 – 2 November 2018) was a professor in the Department of Civil Engineering at the University of KwaZulu Natal. He served as head of department between 1967 and 1982. and as Dean of the Faculty during 1969/1971. Prof Knight was a lecturer and researcher in geotechnical and pavement engineering

== Background ==
Born in Durban, South Africa on 23 March 1922, Knight matriculated from Parktown Boys' High School in 1939. After serving five years in the South African Naval Forces, he continued his studies at the University of the Witwatersrand (Wits) graduating with a BSc (Eng) Civil Engineering in 1949. During his university studies he was an active student leader serving on the Students Engineering Council.

After spending several years working as an engineer for the Springs and Johannesburg Municipalities he returned to Wits as a lecturer in 1955. Here he worked on collapsible soils and presented his PhD thesis titled “The collapse of structure of sandy sub-soils on wetting” in 1960. Following this he spent nine months as an honorary visiting Lecturer at Imperial College.

In 1963 he was appointed as senior lecturer in the Department of Civil Engineering at the University of Natal (now the University of KwaZulu Natal). He was made full professor in 1967 and served as the head of department until his retirement in 1982.

During his professional career he was much in demand as consultant on foundation engineering projects such as piling, ground freezing, and the foundations for multistorey buildings, concrete mining headgears, and large mill houses. After retiring he remained an active consultant.

Knight, considered being a whole engineer required active engagement within one's society. Consequently, he served for several years as chairman of Northcliff Primary School board and held many appointments in the Methodist Church of Southern Africa. After his retirement he was an active member of various charities.

He died in Durban, South Africa on 2 November 2018. He was married to Antoinette with whom he had four daughters and a son, and later several grandchildren and great-grandchildren.

== Contributions ==
Knight was an early advocate of equal access to engineering during apartheid. During his 1977 SAICE Presidential address he stated, "My ideal is that of educating and training engineers of any ethnic group and of either sex to perform engineering work whenever engineering work is required to be done for the benefit of the community." His advocacy was responsible for promoting the career of Trueman Goba, the first black SAICE president, and of Allyson Lawless, the first female SAICE president.

His contributions to geotechnical engineering include research on collapse soils in collaboration with Jeremiah Jennings, and the effect of bentonite on the skin friction on cast-in-situ piles and diaphragm walls. He also contributed to the use of gap graded mixes for asphalt overlays. Knight was also the Chairman of the organising committee for the first Conference on Asphalt Pavements for southern Africa held in Durban in 1969, which now continues on a five yearly cycle.

In addition to serving as SAICE president he also served a number of terms as Chair of the Durban Branch of SAICE. He also served the wider engineering fraternity by sitting on the South African Council for Professional Engineers council and education advisory committee.

== Awards ==
For his contributions to geotechnical engineering, Kenneth Knight was awarded the 1992 SAICE Geotechnical Division Medal. In 1995, he was awarded the SAICE Gold Medal, which is the institutes highest honour that can be bestowed on a Corporate Member.
