= Géotechnique Lecture =

Biennial lecture on the topic of soil mechanics

The Géotechnique lecture is an biennial lecture on the topic of soil mechanics, organised by the British Geotechnical Association named after its major scientific journal Géotechnique.

This should not be confused with the annual BGA Rankine Lecture.

== List of Géotechnique Lecturers ==
No	YEAR	LECTURER	SUBJECT	AFFILIATION
1	1989	David M. Potts & Richard J. Jardine	Offshore Piling	Imperial College
2	1991	Malcolm D. Bolton & Scott Steedman	Dynamic soil behaviour	University of Cambridge & BEQE Ltd
3	1993	William Powrie & Martin Preene	Groundwater control in fine soils	University of Southampton & W J Groundwater Ltd
4	1999	Chris R. I. Clayton & William Powrie	Recent research on embedded retaining walls	University of Southampton
5	2001	Guy T. Houlsby & Roy Butterfield	Foundations on sand: towards a more secure basis for design	University of Oxford & University of Southampton
6	2003	Matthew R. Coop	From laboratory tests to design in sand	Imperial College
7	2005	Simon J. Wheeler	The mechanics of unsaturated soils	University of Glasgow
8	2007	Kenichi Soga		University of Cambridge
9	2009	Jamie R. Standing	Geology, engineering and ground response to tunnelling	Imperial College
10	2011	Byron W. Byrne	Foundation Design for Offshore Wind Turbines	University of Oxford
11	2013	Lidija Zdravković	Geotechnical numerical analysis: a road map	Imperial College
12	2015	Catherine O'Sullivan	A Particulate Perspective on Soil Mechanics	Imperial College
13	2017	Jonathan A. Knappett	Use of vegetation in low-carbon Geotechnical Engineering	University of Dundee
14	2019	David J. White	Designing infrastructure for an evolving seabed	University of Southampton
15	2021	Stuart K. Haigh	Performance-Based Design of Propped Retaining Walls	University of Cambridge
16	2023	Alessandro Tarantino	Bringing vegetation-based solutions into geotechnical engineering design: how do we make it happen?	University of Strathclyde
17	2025			

== See also ==
- Named lectures
- Rankine Lecture
