= Charles Wang-wai Ng =

Charles W.W. Ng
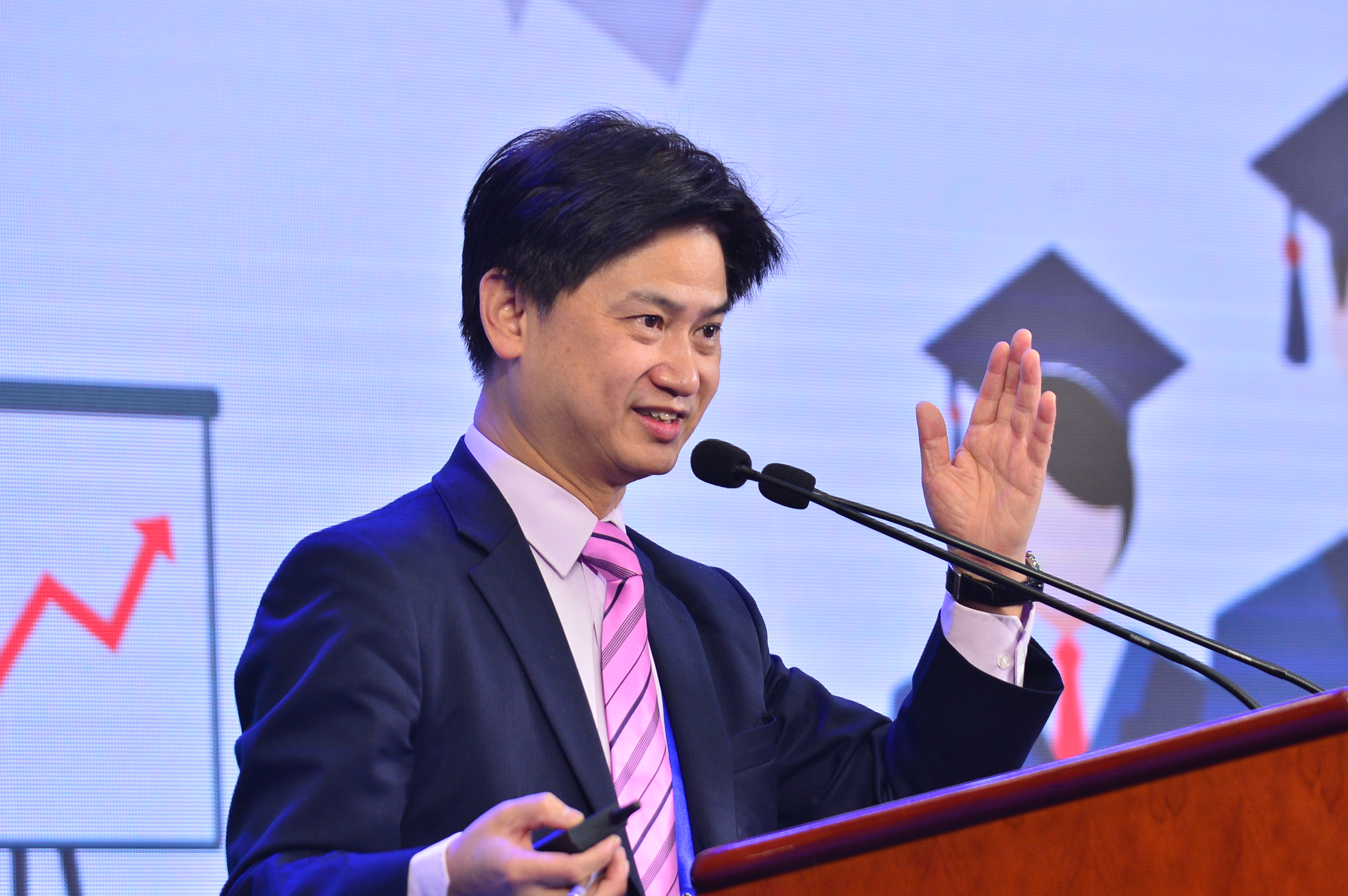
- Education: University of Bristol (Ph.D in Civil Engineering)
- Occupations: Chair Professor of Civil and Environmental Engineering
- Employer(s): The Hong Kong University of Science and Technology
- Known for: Unsaturated soil mechanics, eco-geotechnics, debris flow and landslide hazard mitigation, soil-structure interaction, geotechnical engineering.

Chinese name
- Traditional Chinese: 吳宏偉
- Jyutping: Ng4 Wang4wai6, Charles
- Website: https://charles-ng.hkust.edu.hk/

Charles Wang-wai Ng is the Vice-President of Institutional Advancement at HKUST, Clear Water Bay Campus. He also serves as the CLP Holdings Professor of Sustainability, Chair Professor in the Department of Civil and Environmental Engineering at the Hong Kong University of Science and Technology (HKUST), and a Director of State Key Laboratory of Climate Resilience for Coastal Cities (SKL-CRCC). He has served the President of International Society for Soil Mechanics and Geotechnical Engineering (ISSMGE) from 2017 to 2022.

== Education ==
Charles W. W. Ng attended the University of Bristol where he completed his PhD degree in civil engineering in 1993. From 1993 to 1995, he has worked as a post-doctoral research associate in soil mechanics and geotechnical engineering with professors Malcolm Bolton and Sarah Springman at the University of Cambridge. He was elected as an Overseas Fellow of the Churchill College.

== Career ==
Professor Ng joined HKUST in 1995 as assistant professor and was promoted to chair professor in 2011. He was conferred the first CLP Holdings Professor of Sustainability named professorship in 2017. He has served as the Dean of HKUST Fok Ying Tung Graduate School at HKUST from 2020 to 2025 and the Vice-President of HKUST (Guangzhou) Campus from 2021 to 2025. He was appointed as the Vice-President for Institutional Advancement of HKUST in August 2025.

== Awards ==
Professor Ng has received numerous awards including the 2025 Telford Gold Medal from the Institution of Civil Engineers (ICE) — the highest honour bestowed by the ICE since its establishment in 1838. He also earned the 2025 Donald Stanley Award (the best paper in Environmental Engineering) from the Canadian Society for Civil Engineering, the 2023 Scott Sloan Paper Award (highest cited paper in previous 5 years) from Computers and Geotechnics, the R. M. Quigley Award from the Canadian Geotechnical Society, which he has won four times for best papers published in Canadian Geotechnical Journal in 2023, 2016, 2012 and 2007, the 2022 Varnes Medal from the International Consortium on Landslides, the 2022 Fredlund Award (highest cited paper published in Canadian Geotechnical Journal in previous 5 years) from the Canadian Geotechnical Society.

In mainland China, Professor Ng received the 2025 Natural Science Award by the Chinese Society for Rock Mechanics and Engineering, 2024 Natural Science Award of Hainan Province, the 2022 Ho Leung Ho Lee Foundation Prize for Scientific and Technological Progress, the 2020 National Natural Science Award and the 2015 Scientific Technological Advancement Award from the State Council of China. He was elected as a Changjiang Scholar (Chair Professorship in Geotechnical Engineering) by the Ministry of Education in 2010 and a recipient of Overseas, Hong Kong and Macau Young Scholars’ award in 2007 by the National Science Foundation of China.

== Honours ==
Professor Ng was elected as a Fellow of Royal Academy of Engineering in 2020 and a Fellow of the Hong Kong Academy of Engineering Sciences in 2008. He has been elected as the 65th Rankine Lecturer by the British Geotechnical Association. The lecture will be held on 24 March 2027.

== Professional affiliations ==
Professor Ng is a Chartered Civil Engineer (CEng) and a Fellow of the Institution of Civil Engineers (UK), the American Society of Civil Engineers, and the Hong Kong Institution of Engineers.

Professor Ng serves as an Editor-in-Chief of Canadian Geotechnical Journal. He is an Associate Editor of the Landslides journal. He serves as an Editorial Board Member of leading geotechnical journals: Computers and Geotechnics, Geomechanics for Energy and the Environment, Chinese Journal of Geotechnical Engineering and Journal of Zhejiang University-Science A (Applied Physics & Engineering).

== Achievements ==
Professor Ng has published extensively in the field of unsaturated soil mechanics, eco-geotechnics, debris flow and landslide hazard mitigation, soil-structure interaction, geotechnical engineering. He holds 29 licenses and invention patents. He has supervised more than 92 PhD and 63 MPhil students from 23 countries and regions to graduation.

Professor Ng is globally ranked 2nd by Stanford University in the list of Top 2% Scientists Worldwide in the subfield of Geological & Geomatics Engineering; Civil Engineering in September 2025.

== Personal life ==
On 5 January 2022, Carrie Lam announced new warnings and restrictions against social gathering due to potential COVID-19 outbreaks. These new restrictions came into effect from 7 January 2022 onwards for a period of 14 days (up to 20 January 2022). On 3 January 2022, Ng had attended a birthday party hosted by Witman Hung Wai-man, with 222 guests. At least one guest tested positive with COVID-19, causing many guests to be quarantined. Ng was photographed at the party without wearing a mask.
