= Rankine Lecture =

Annual lecture organised by the British Geotechnical Association

The Rankine lecture is an annual lecture organised by the British Geotechnical Association named after William John Macquorn Rankine, an early contributor to the theory of soil mechanics.

This should not be confused with the biennial BGA Géotechnique Lecture.

The Rankine Lecture is held in March each year. In even-numbered years, the lecturer is from the UK. In odd-numbered years, the lecturer is from outside the UK. Each lecture is usually published in Géotechnique.

== List of Rankine Lecturers ==
No	YEAR	LECTURER	SUBJECT	Géotechnique	AFFILIATION
1	1961	A. Casagrande	Casagrande, A. (1961). "Control of Seepage through Foundations and Abutments of Dams*". Géotechnique. 11 (3): 161–182. doi:10.1680/geot.1961.11.3.161.		Harvard University
2	1962	L. F. Cooling	Field measurements in soil mechanics	12(2) 77-103	Building Research Establishment
3	1963	A. Mayer	Recent work in rock mechanics	13(2) 99-118	
4	1964	A. W. Skempton	Long-term stability of clay slopes	14(2) 77-101	Imperial College
5	1965	N. M. Newmark	Effects of earthquakes on dams and embankments	15(2) 139-159	University of Illinois at Urbana-Champaign
6	1966	A. W. Bishop	The strength of soils as engineering materials	16(2) 91-128	Imperial College
7	1967	L. Bjerrum	Engineering geology of Norwegian normally-consolidated marine clays as related to settlements of buildings	17(2) 83-117	Norwegian Geotechnical Institute
8	1968	R. Glossop	The rise of geotechnology and its influence on engineering practice	18(2) 107-150	John Mowlem and Co., Ltd
9	1969	R. B. Peck	Advantages and limitations of the observational method in applied soil mechanics	19(2) 171-187	University of Illinois
10	1970	K. H. Roscoe	The influence of strains in soil mechanics	20(2) 129-170	University of Cambridge
11	1971	J. C. Jaeger	Friction of rocks and stability of rock slopes	21(2) 97-134	Australian National University, Canberra
12	1972	P. W. Rowe	The relevance of soil fabric to site investigation practice	22(2) 195-300	University of Manchester
13	1973	T. W. Lambe	Predictions in soil engineering	23(2) 151-201	Massachusetts Institute of Technology
14	1974	R. E. Gibson	The analytical method in soil mechanics	24(2) 115-139	King's College, London
15	1975	J. Kérisel	Old structures in relation to soil conditions	25(3) 433-482	Simecsol Études
16	1976	A. C. Meigh	The Triassic rocks, with particular reference to predicted and observed performance of some major foundations	26(3) 393-451	Soil Mechanics Limited
17	1977	V. F. B. de Mello	Reflections on design decisions of practical significance to embankment dams	27(3) 281-354	Private Consultant, Brazil
18	1978	W. H. Ward	Ground supports for tunnels in weak rocks	28(2) 135-170	Building Research Establishment
19	1979	H. Bolton Seed	Considerations in the earthquake-resistant design of earth and rockfill dams	29(3) 215-262	University of California, Berkeley
20	1980	A. N. Schofield	Cambridge geotechnical centrifuge operations	30(3) 227-267	University of Cambridge
21	1981	Norbert R. Morgenstern	Geotechnical engineering and frontier resource development	31(3) 305-365	University of Alberta
22	1982	D. J. Henkel	Geology, geomorphology and geotechnics	32(3) 175-194	Ove Arup & Partners
23	1983	E. Hoek	Strength of jointed rock masses	33(3) 187-222	Golder Associates, Vancouver
24	1984	C. P. Wroth	The interpretation of in situ soil tests	34(4) 449-488	University of Oxford
25	1985	N. Janbu	Soil models in offshore engineering	35(3) 241-280	Norwegian Institute of Technology
26	1986	A. D. M. Penman	On the embankment dam	36(3) 303-347	Geotechnical Engineering Consultant, Harpenden
27	1987	R. F. Scott	Failure	37(4) 423-466	California Institute of Technology
28	1988	H. B. Sutherland	Uplift resistance in soils	38(4) 493-515	University of Glasgow Trust
29	1989	H. G. Poulos	Pile behaviour - theory and application	39(3) 365-415	University of Sydney
30	1990	J. B. Burland	On the compressibility and shear strength of natural clays	40(3) 329-378	Imperial College
31	1991	J. K. Mitchell	Conduction phenomena: from theory to geotechnical practice	41(3) 299-339	University of California, Berkeley
32	1992	B. Simpson	Retaining structures: displacement and design	42(4) 541-576	Ove Arup & Partners
33	1993	K. Ishihara	Liquefaction and flow failure during earthquakes	43(3) 351-414	University of Tokyo
34	1994	P. R. Vaughan	Assumption, prediction and reality in geotechnical engineering	44(4) 573-608	Imperial College
35	1995	R. E. Goodman	Block theory and its application	45(3) 383-422	University of California, Berkeley
36	1996	S. F. Brown	Soil mechanics in pavement engineering	46(3) 383-425	University of Nottingham
37	1997	G. E. Blight	Interactions between the atmosphere and the Earth	47(4) 715-766	University of Witwatersrand
38	1998	D. W. Hight	Soil characterisation: the importance of structure and anisotropy	-	Imperial College
39	1999	S. Leroueil	Natural slopes and cuts: movement and failure mechanisms	51(3) 197-243	Université Laval, Ste-Foy, Québec
40	2000	J. H. Atkinson	Non-linear soil stiffness in routine design	50(5) 487-507	City University, London
41	2001	H. Brandl	Energy foundations and other thermo-active ground structures	56(2) 81-122	Vienna University of Technology, Austria
42	2002	D. M. Potts	Numerical analysis: a virtual dream or practical reality?	53(6) 535-572	Imperial College
43	2003	M. F. Randolph	Science and empiricism in pile foundation design	53(10) 847-874	University of Western Australia
44	2004	N. N. Ambraseys	Engineering, seismology and soil mechanics	-	Imperial College
45	2005	R. K. Rowe	Long term performance of contaminant barrier systems	55(9) 631-678	Queen's University at Kingston, Ontario, Canada
46	2006	R. J. Mair	Tunnelling and geotechnics - new horizons	58(9) 695-736	University of Cambridge
47	2007	A. Gens	Soil-environment interactions in geotechnical engineering	60(1) 3-74	Universitat Politècnica de Catalunya
48	2008	J. A. Charles	The engineering behaviour of fill - the use, misuse and disuse of case histories	58(7) 541-570	Building Research Establishment
49	2009	T. D. O'Rourke	Geohazards & Large Geographically Distributed Systems	60(7) 505-543	Cornell University
50	2010	C. R. I. Clayton	Stiffness at small strain - research and practice	61(1) 5-37	University of Southampton
51	2011	S. W. Sloan	Geotechnical Stability Analysis	63(7) 531-571	University of Newcastle, Australia
52	2012	M. D. Bolton	Performance-based design in geotechnical engineering		University of Cambridge
53	2013	M. Jamiolkowski	Soil Mechanics and the observational method: Challenges at the Zelazny Most copper tailings disposal facility	64(8) 590-619	Politecnico di Torino
54	2014	G. T. Houlsby	Interactions in Offshore Foundation Design	66(10) 791-825	University of Oxford
55	2015	S. Lacasse	Hazard, Risk and Reliability in Geotechnical Practice		Norwegian Geotechnical Institute
56	2016	R. Jardine	Geotechnics and Energy	70(1) 3-59	Imperial College
57	2017	E. Alonso	Triggering and Motion of Landslides	71(1) 3-59	Universitat Politècnica de Catalunya
58	2018	N. O'Riordan	Dynamic soil-structure interaction		ARUP
59	2019	G. Gazetas	Benefits of Unconventional Seismic Foundation Design		National Technical University of Athens
60	2022 (2020)	S. Jefferis	The Unusual and the Unexpected in Geotechnical Engineering		Environmental Geotechnics Limited
61	2023	John P. Carter	Constitutive Modelling in Computational Geomechanics		University of Newcastle, Australia
62	2024	Lidija Zdravković	Geotechnical Engineering for a Sustainable Society		Imperial College London
63	2025	Kenichi Soga			University of California, Berkeley

== See also ==
- Named lectures
- Géotechnique Lecture
