= Norbert Morgenstern =

Canadian geotechnical engineer (born 1935)

Norbert Rubin Morgenstern (born May 25, 1935) is a Canadian geotechnical engineer and professor, specializing in geotechnical engineering. He has over 300 research publications and more than 40 awards for achievement in engineering.

== Early life and education ==
Morgenstern was born in Toronto on May 25, 1935 to parents Joel and Bella Morgenstern. He earned a Bachelors degree in engineering from the University of Toronto in 1956. He was awarded the Athlone Fellowship for post-graduate studies, the purpose of which was to send Canadian engineering students to Britain for further study. With the Fellowship, he enrolled at Imperial College London, achieving his Doctorate in soil mechanics in 1964 under the supervision of Sir Alec Skempton.

== Career ==
Morgenstern joined the faculty at Imperial College in 1958 as a Research Assistant, before becoming a lecturer in 1960. Dean R. M. Hardy, Dean of Engineering at the University of Alberta and Professor S. R. Sinclair encouraged Morgenstern to return to Canada and join the University of Alberta, which he did in 1968. In 1985, he achieved the distinction of University Professor. He was chairman of the Department of Civil and Environmental Engineering between 1995 and 1998, and he retired from teaching in 1999. Over the course of his teaching career, Morgenstern supervised 23 masters students and 45 doctoral students.

Following his return to Canada, Morgenstern helped develop the framework for modern permafrost engineering. At the same time, he studied the geotechnical aspects of the Alberta oil sands while also researching tailings dams and other waste facilities. This work contributed to the development of Alberta's oil sands and improved environmental integrity in mining.

Morgenstern has carried out non-academic work as a consultant on water development projects, landslide studies and other resource development projects in over twenty countries on six continents. He has assisted in technology transfer to developing countries through the United Nations and other agencies. In Canada, he has advised on a number of foundation problems, he has been a consultant to many of the arctic development projects of the past two decades and has been closely associated with both operating oil sand mines. He has participated in more than 140 dam projects worldwide, as well as in special geotechnical problems in Canada and offshore structures. Morgenstern has published more than 300 technical articles.

== Research and contributions ==
Morgenstern's research and work concentrates on geotechnical aspects of oil sand development, permafrost engineering, dams, mine waste management, numerical modeling of geotechnical structures, progressive ground failure, landslides and risk analysis.

The 1965 publication of his article "The Analysis of the Stability of General Slip Surfaces" with V.E. Price in Géotechnique led to the development of a new limit equilibrium slope stability method called the Morgenstern-Price Method, which is included in various commercial slope stability software programs. This research explored the mechanics of slope stability as it applies to the evaluation of landslides and the design of dams. The 1965 article received the British Geotechnical Association prize (an award he had also received in 1960).

== Awards and honours ==
Morgenstern is the recipient of over 40 major honours and awards, including honorary degrees from the University of Toronto, Queen's University, and the University of Alberta. He has delivered the prestigious Rankine, Terzaghi, Casagrande, Rocha and Lumb Lectures. Morgenstern is a Fellow of the Royal Society of Canada, the Canadian Academy of Engineering, the Engineering Institute of Canada, and the Canadian Society for Civil Engineering. He is a Foreign Associate of the U.S. National Academy of Engineering, a Foreign Member of the U.K. Royal Academy of Engineering, and a Foreign Fellow of the Indian Academy of Engineering. Morgenstern was inducted into the Alberta Order of Excellence in 1991 and was invested into the Order of Canada in 2001. He was awarded the Queen's Diamond Jubilee Medal in 2012. In 2024, Morgenstern received the Lifetime Achievement Medal from the International Society for Soil Mechanics and Geotechnical Engineering.

== Personal life ==
Morgenstern has been married to his wife Patricia (née Gooderham) since 1960, and the couple have three children and seven grandchildren. Morgenstern had a younger sister, Hilda Friedman.
