= Antonio Gens =

Spanish geotechnical academic

- Born: September 20, 1950 (age 76); Constantí, Catalonia, Spain
- Occupations: Geotechnical researcher and academic

Academic background
- Education: Ingeniero de Caminos, Canales y Puertos; M.Sc. Ph.D.
- Alma mater: Technical University of Madrid; Imperial College, London

Antonio Gens (born 20 September 1950), is a geotechnical researcher and academic. He is a professor at the Technical University of Catalonia. Gens has conducted research on unsaturated soils, soft clays, and multi-physics analysis. He is a fellow of the UK Royal Academy of Engineering.

== Education ==
Gens completed his Ingeniero de Caminos, Canales y Puertos degree from the Technical University of Madrid in 1972. Later, from Imperial College, London, he earned his M.Sc. in 1973, followed by a Ph.D. in 1982.

== Career ==
Gens began his career as a civil engineer at RODIO from 1974 to 1976. At Imperial College London, he held the position of research assistant between 1978 and 1982. Then he joined Technical University of Catalonia as an associate professor and became a full professor in 1988. Between 2013 and 2017, he was a vice-president for Europe at the International Society for Soil Mechanics and Geotechnical Engineering. Since 2022, he has been the president of the Spanish Society for Soil Mechanics and Geotechnical Engineering.

== Research ==
Gens' research work has incorporated field back-analysis/measurements, numerical/constitutive modelling, soil freezing, stability of slopes, disposal of nuclear waste, and tailing reservoirs. Together with Alonso and Josa, he developed a model that assessed volume change as an outcome of net-mean stress and suction. He and Alonso further presented a model for characterizing the mechanical behavior of unsaturated expansive clays that incorporates two structural levels: the microstructural level, wherein the clay minerals' basic swelling occurs, and the macrostructural level, which is responsible for the organization of aggregated clay clusters.

== Awards and honors ==
- 2006 – Rock Mechanics Case History Award, American Rock Mechanics Association
- 2007 – Rankine Lecture, British Geotechnical Association
- 2007 – Telford Gold Medal, Institution of Civil Engineers
- 2009 – R.M. Quigley Award (first prize), Canadian Geotechnical Society
- 2011 – Fellow, UK Royal Academy of Engineering
- 2012 – George Stephenson Medal, Institution of Civil Engineers
- 2014 – Doctor Honoris Causa, Université de Grenoble - Joseph Fourier
- 2017 – Kevin Nash Gold Medal, International Society for Soil Mechanics and Geotechnical Engineering
- 2019 – Laureate Engineer, The Royal Academy of Engineering

== Selected articles ==
- Alonso, E. E.; Gens, A.; Josa, A. (1990). "A constitutive model for partially saturated soils". Géotechnique. 40 (3): 405–430. Bibcode:1990Getq...40..405A. doi:10.1680/geot.1990.40.3.405. hdl:2117/2634.
- Gens, A.; Alonso, E. E. (1992). "A framework for the behaviour of unsaturated expansive clays". Canadian Geotechnical Journal. 29 (6): 1013–1032. Bibcode:1992CaGJ...29.1013G. doi:10.1139/t92-120.
- Olivella, S.; Gens, A.; Carrera, J.; Alonso, E. E. (1996). "Numerical formulation for a simulator (CODE_BRIGHT) for the coupled analysis of saline media". Engineering Computations. 13 (7): 87–112. doi:10.1108/02644409610151575. hdl:2117/2210.
- Gallipoli, D.; Gens, A.; Sharma, R.; Vaunat, J. (2003). "An elasto-plastic model for unsaturated soil incorporating the effects of suction and degree of saturation on mechanical behaviour". Géotechnique. 53 (1): 123–135. Bibcode:2003Getq...53..123G. doi:10.1680/geot.2003.53.1.123.
- Gens, A.; Sánchez, M.; Sheng, D. (2006). "On constitutive modelling of unsaturated soils". Acta Geotechnica. 1 (3): 137–147. Bibcode:2006AcGtc...1..137G. doi:10.1007/s11440-006-0013-9.
- Gens, A.; Sánchez, M.; Guimarães, L. D. N.; Alonso, E. E.; Lloret, A.; Olivella, S.; Huertas, F. (2009). "A full-scale in situ heating test for high-level nuclear waste disposal: observations, analysis and interpretation". Géotechnique. 59 (4): 377–399. Bibcode:2009Getq...59..377G. doi:10.1680/geot.2009.59.4.377.
- Gens, A. (2010). "Soil–environment interactions in geotechnical engineering". Géotechnique. 60 (1): 3–74. Bibcode:2010Getq...60....3G. doi:10.1680/geot.9.P.109.
