= Le Houérou =

Le Houérou, Le Huérou, Le Huërou or Le Houërff is a surname of Breton origin.

Le Houérou as written in the Catholicon derives from c'hwerv which means bitter in Breton.

== Notable people with this surname ==
- Annie Le Houérou, French MP and mayor of Guingamp
- Cathy Le Houérou, French basketball player who played for Pays d'Aix Basket 13, Pleyber-Christ, Saint-Brieuc (in French)
- Henri-Noël Le Houérou, French biologist, plant collector and specialist of North African ecosystems, recipient of the Order of Agricultural Merit in 1991
- Joël Le Houérou, French badminton player who won the 1963 French National Badminton Championships with Yves Corbel and Vice-champion of France veterans in 1986 with Christian Badou
- Philippe Le Houérou, Vice President for the World Bank’s South Asia Region
- Pierre-Paul Le Houérou, vicar of Saint-Eutrope (Plougonven) in 1791 who refused to take the oath of fidelity to the Civil Constitution of the Clergy
- Jean Kérisel (born Jean Lehuérou Kérisel), French engineer and Egyptologist.
