= Skempton =

Skempton is a surname. Notable people with the surname include:

- Alec Skempton (1914–2001), British civil engineer, pioneer of soil mechanics
- Howard Skempton (born 1947), English composer, pianist, and accordionist
