= Guy T. Houlsby =

British civil engineer

- Education: University of Cambridge
- Scientific career
- Workplaces: University of Oxford
- Thesis: A Study of Plasticity Theories and Their Applicability to Soils (1981)
- Doctoral advisor: Peter Wroth
- Website: www.eng.ox.ac.uk/civil/people/gth-1/houlsby

Guy Tinmouth Houlsby is Professor of Civil Engineering and former Head of the Department of Engineering Science at the University of Oxford. He specialises in Geotechnical Engineering and more particularly in offshore foundations.

== Education ==
He carried out research in Geotechnical Engineering at the University of Cambridge, under the advisory of Peter Wroth, leading to the award of a PhD degree in 1981 with his thesis titled "A Study of Plasticity Theories and Their Applicability to Soils".

== Recognition ==
Professor Houlsby was invited to deliver the 54th BGA Rankine Lecture in 2014 at Imperial College, entitled "Interactions in Offshore Foundation Design". In 2001 he delivered the 5th BGA Géotechnique Lecture.

He was elected in 1999 as a Fellow of the Royal Academy of Engineering (FREng).
