= Malcolm Bolton =

British soil mechanics engineer and professor

Malcolm D. Bolton
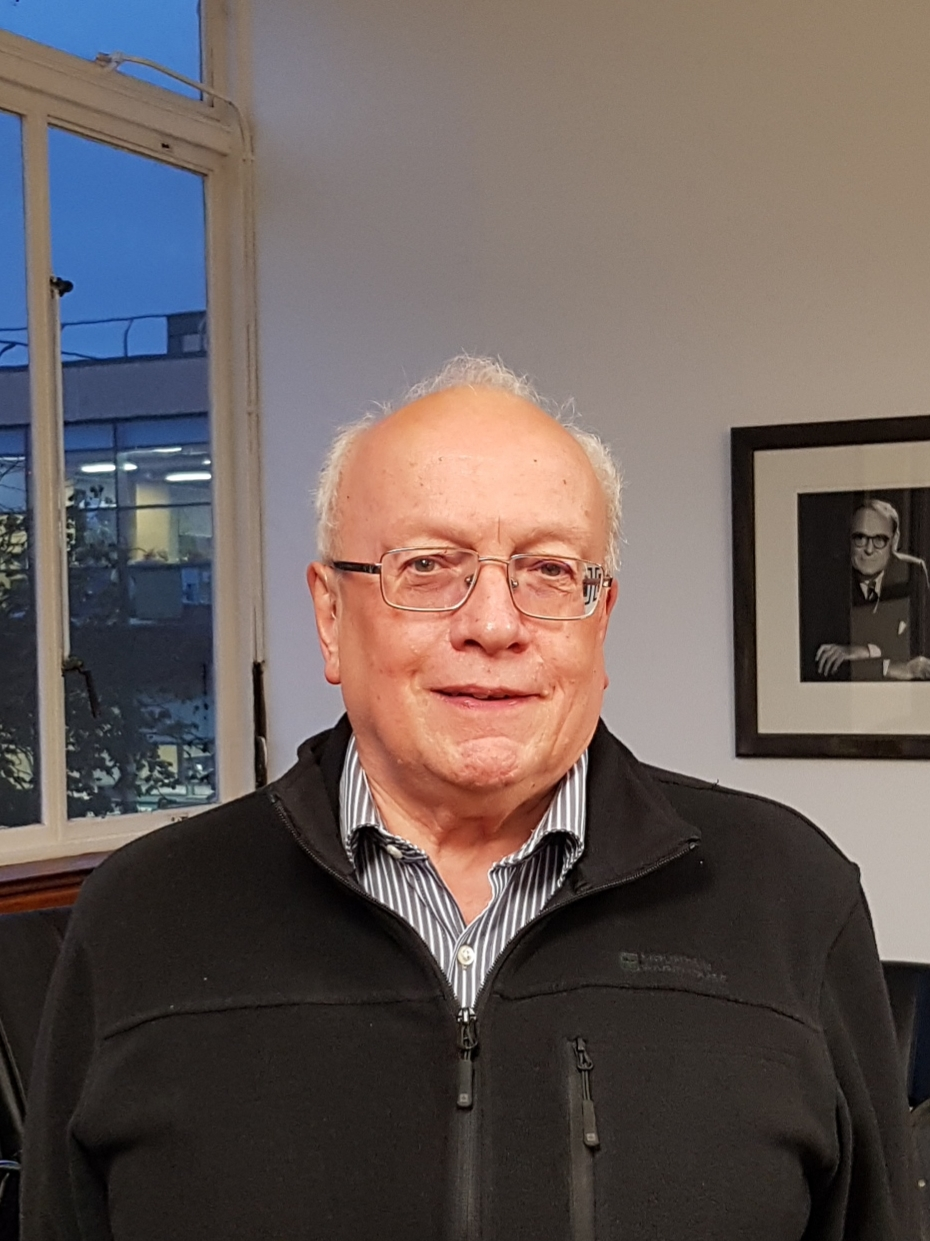
- Malcolm Bolton in Cambridge, 2019
- Born: 1946 (age 79–80); England
- Education: Cambridge University, UK; University of Manchester Institute of Science and Technology (UMIST)
- Known for: Mobilisable strength design (MSD), Geotechnical centrifuge modelling
- Awards: 52nd Rankine Lecture, 2012; Fellow of the Royal Academy of Engineering
- Scientific career
- Fields: Soil Mechanics, Geotechnical Engineering
- Workplaces: Cambridge University, UK; University of Manchester Institute of Science and Technology (UMIST)
- Doctoral advisor: Andrew N. Schofield

Malcolm David Bolton (born 1946) is a British soil mechanics engineer and professor of geotechnical engineering at the University of Cambridge.

== Education ==
He read engineering at the University of Cambridge. He then studied for a MSc at the University of Manchester Institute of Science and Technology (UMIST) and then did research in soil mechanics at Cambridge which led to the award of a PhD.

== Career ==
He currently holds the Chair of Soil Mechanics at the University of Cambridge and his is the Director of the Schofield Centrifuge Centre for Geotechnical Processes and Construction. He published extensively in the field of fundamental soil mechanics, geotechnical centrifuge testing and geotechnical design. For the latter topic, he introduced the mobilisable strength design (MSD) method. In 2012, he was invited to deliver the prestigious 52nd Rankine Lecture, titled "Performance-based design in geotechnical engineering". In 1991 he delivered the 2nd BGA Géotechnique Lecture.
