= David M. Potts (academic) =

David Malcolm Potts
- Born: 1952 (age 73–74)
- Education: King's College, London, University of Cambridge
- Known for: ICFEP
- Awards: Fellow of the Royal Academy of Engineering
- Scientific career
- Fields: Geotechnical engineering Numerical analysis
- Workplaces: Imperial College London; Shell
- Thesis: Behaviour of lined and unlined tunnels in sand (1976)
- Doctoral advisor: John H. Atkinson
- Website: www3.imperial.ac.uk/people/d.potts

David Malcolm Potts (born 1952) is a professor of Analytical Soil Mechanics at Imperial College London and the head of the Geotechnics Section at Imperial College. He has been a member of the academic staff at Imperial College since 1979, responsible for teaching the use of analytical methods in geomechanics and the design of slopes and earth retaining structures, both at undergraduate and postgraduate levels.

== Education ==
Potts was educated at the Barstable Grammar School in Basildon, Essex and went on to study Civil Engineering at King's College, London, graduating top of the class and gaining a Bachelor of Science degree with first class honours in 1973. He then went to Churchill College of the University of Cambridge where he carried out analytical and experimental research on the behaviour of tunnels and obtained a PhD in Geotechnical Engineering in 1976 under the supervision of Dr John H. Atkinson (a former Rankine Lecturer (2000) and currently Emeritus Professor at City University London).

== Professional work ==
After his research at Cambridge in 1976, he went to the Shell Research Laboratories in Rijswijk, the Netherlands where he worked on experimental and theoretical geotechnical problems involved in the Oil & Gas industry through development of numerical methods for analysis. His work concentrated particularly on the cyclic loading of clay, on the development of numerical methods for analysing the foundation behaviour of marine gravity structures, on the estimation of stresses in oil well casings, and on the stability of offshore pipelines.

In 1979 Potts joined the academic staff at the Department of Civil Engineering at Imperial College and was responsible for research and teaching in the field of numerical and analytical methods in geomechanics. At Imperial College, Potts worked with and was influenced by Professors Peter Rolfe Vaughan and John Burland. Since 1998, he holds the position of Professor of Analytical Soil Mechanics and of Head of Geotechnics. Professor Potts has worked extensively on the development of computer methods of analysis and, more particularly, on the application of elasto-plastic finite element programs to the analysis of real geotechnical structures. His consulting work has been concerned with the design of piles, including tension piles for offshore anchored structures, the response of offshore gravity platform foundations to cyclic loading, retaining structures of various types, cut-and-cover tunnels, bored tunnels, culverts subject to mining subsidence, the stability of embankments on soft ground, the stability and deformation of earth dams, the behaviour of Reinforced Earth structures, the prediction of ground movements around deep excavations and the role of progressive failure in embankment and cut slope problems.

He has developed his own bespoke finite element software, called "Imperial College Finite Element Program" (ICFEP) and has also authored three specialist textbooks on the theory and applications of finite element analysis in geotechnical engineering. Professor Potts has been author and co-author of around 300 technical publications, has been reviewer of numerous academic journals and the Editor of the journal Computers and Geotechnics.

== Awards ==
Potts was elected a Fellow of the Royal Academy of Engineering in 2001 and delivered the 42nd Rankine Lecture of the British Geotechnical Association, titled "Numerical analysis: a virtual dream or practical reality?".

In addition, Potts has received several research grants from the industry and the Engineering and Physical Sciences Research Council (EPSRC). In addition, Potts has developed a reputation as a researcher and an expert in numerical analysis, typically offering his experience in the industry via consulting work. He is currently a Senior Consultant with the Geotechnical Consulting Group, who sponsors his chair at Imperial College.
