= Harry Poulos =

Australian engineer (born 1940)

Harry George Poulos
- Born: 27 April 1940 (age 86); Katoomba, New South Wales, Australia
- Education: University of Sydney
- Known for: Piled Foundations, Marine Geotechnics, Earthquake Geotechnics
- Awards: 29th Rankine Lecture (1989)
- Scientific career
- Fields: Foundation engineering Soil mechanics
- Workplaces: University of Sydney
- Thesis: The analysis of settlement of foundations on clay soils under three-dimensional conditions (1965)
- Doctoral advisor: Edward H. Davis

Harry George Poulos (born 27 April 1940) is an Australian of Greek descent civil engineer specialising in geotechnical engineering and soil mechanics, internationally known as an expert on soil behaviour and pile foundations.

== Short biographical details ==
Poulos graduated from the University of Sydney, where he took a bachelor's degree, BSc in 1961 and his doctorate, PhD in 1965. His PhD research was supervised by Professor Edward H. Davis and was titled "The analysis of settlement of foundations on clay soils under three-dimensional conditions". During 1964–65, he was an engineer at MacDonald Wagner and Priddle. From 1965 he was Lecturer, Senior Lecturer in 1969, Reader in 1972 and from 1982, Professor at the University of Sydney, where he is now Professor Emeritus. In 1976 he was awarded a higher doctorate degree DSc from the University of Sydney.

== Academic contributions ==
Poulos has had enormous academic research contributions to the behaviour of piles.

== International recognition ==
In 1989 he delivered the 29th Rankine Lecture entitled "Pile behavior: theory and application", and in 2005, the Terzaghi Lecture, entitled Pile behavior: Consequences of geology and construction imperfections. Poulos was awarded in 1973, the J. James R. Croes Medal of ASCE, in 1995 the ASCE State of the Art of Civil Engineering Award, is an honorary member of ASCE since 2010. He was awarded the Australian Centenary Medal in 2001, the Warren Medal and the Warren Price (1985) of the Australian Institute of Civil Engineers and the 2007 Thomas A. Middlebrooks Award from the ASCE. He was appointed a member of the Order of Australia in 1993. In 1988 he received the John Jaeger Memorial Award. He was elected a fellow of the Australian Academy of Science (1988) and the Australian Academy of Technical Sciences and Engineering (1996). In 2003 he became the Australian civil engineer of the year.

Poulos served in the Australian Standards Committee for pile foundations (2010), was from 1980 to 1995 part of the Council of the Australian Geomechanics Society (AGS), was from 1982 to 1984 its president, and the Council of the International Society for Soil Mechanics and Geotechnical Engineering (ISSMGE) the vice president for the Asia-Australia region he was in 1989 to 1994. Since 2002 at the Sydney section of the AGS Poulos Lecture in his honour.

== Consulting work ==
He has been involved worldwide in various basic construction projects, such as pile foundations for skyscrapers in Dubai (Burj Al Arab, Emirates Towers, the Burj Dubai, the tallest skyscraper in the world, where he performed the geotechnical testing), the Docklands Project in Melbourne, or 700 km (430 mi) Egnatia Odos motorway straight through Greece (2001 to 2005), where in particular the earthquakes played a role. Other projects included consultations with various offshore structures such as oil rigs.

Since 1989 he has been an employee of Coffey Geotechnics, where he has held various management positions. He was from 1991 to 1993 on the executive board and today (2010) he is Senior Principal.
