= Lyesse Laloui =

Swiss civil engineer (born 1963)

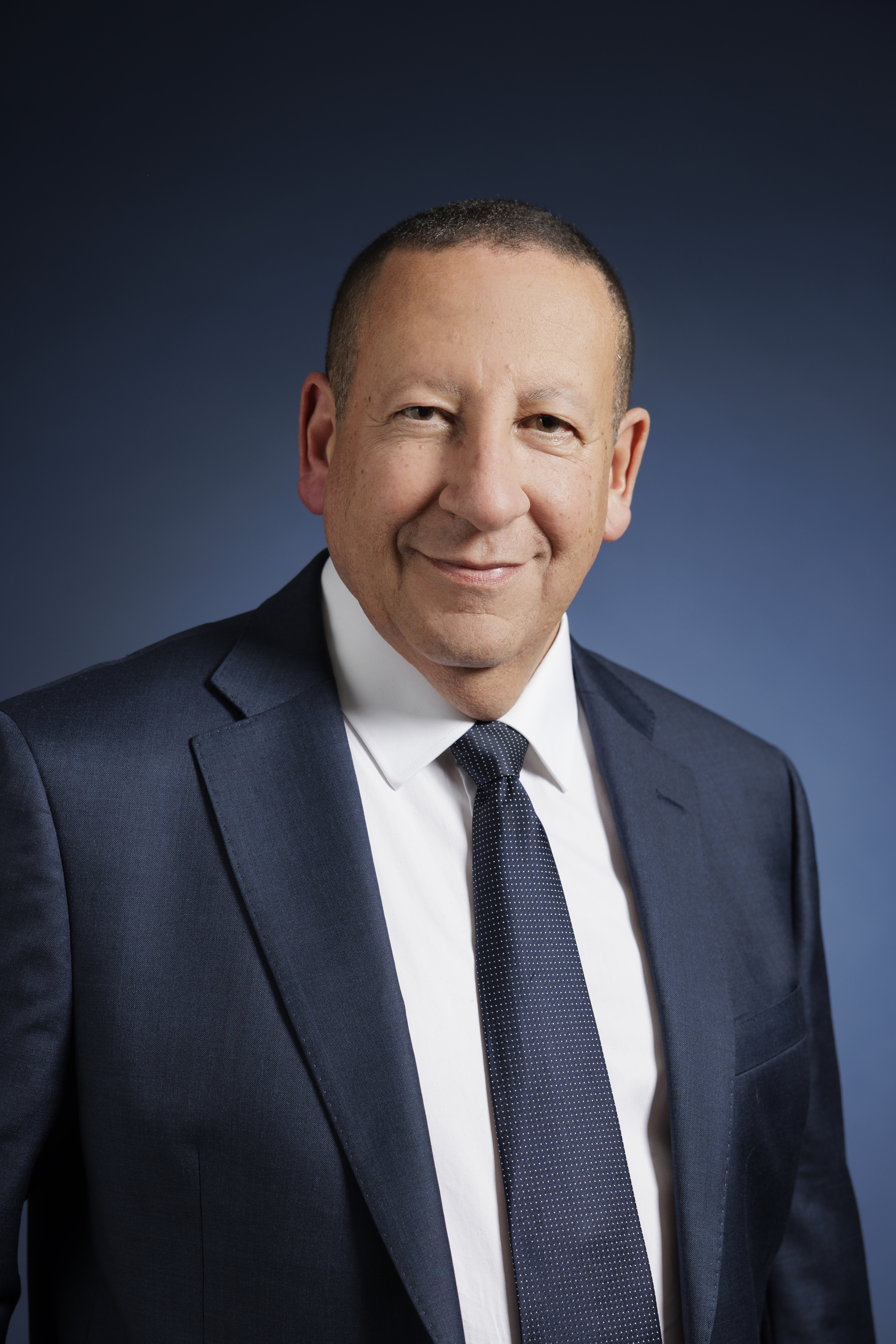
- Prof. Lyesse Laloui
- Born: 29 July 1963 (age 63); Skikda, Algeria
- Education: École centrale Paris
- Scientific career
- Fields: Civil engineering, geotechnical engineering, geomechanics
- Workplaces: École Polytechnique Fédérale de Lausanne (EPFL)
- Thesis: "Modelisation du comportement thermo–hydro–mecanique des milieux poreux anelastique (1993)
- Website: www.epfl.ch/labs/lms/

Lyesse Laloui (born 1963) is a Swiss civil engineer and full Professor at the École Polytechnique Fédérale de Lausanne (EPFL) where he has directed the Laboratory of Soil Mechanics (LMS) since 2008. His research addresses energy geostructures, geological CO2 sequestration, nuclear waste disposal, and bio-cementation of soils. He is the current President of the International Society for Soil Mechanics and Geotechnical Engineering (ISSMGE), the international professional body for geotechnical engineering, representing over 21,000 individual members worldwide.

== Early life and education ==
Laloui was born in 1963. He received a Master's in Civil Engineering from the Ecole Nationale des Travaux Publics in Algiers (1987), an Advanced Master's in Soil and Structural Mechanics (1989), and a PhD (summa cum laude) from Ecole Centrale Paris (1993).

== Career ==
Laloui joined EPFL in 1994 and became a full professor in 2006. He has directed the Laboratory of Soil Mechanics (LMS) since 2008. He has authored over 400 peer-reviewed journal publications and 13 books, and holds several patents relating to bio-cementation and geotechnical instrumentation. His work has been cited 28,137 times, with an h-index of 80, as of November 2026. He is founder and Honorary Editor-in-Chief of the Elsevier journal Geomechanics for Energy and the Environment.

In 2018 he received the European Research Council's Advanced Grant for the project BIOGEOS, and in 2020 its Proof of Concept Grant for CEBREWA. In 2022 he received an honorary doctorate from Heriot-Watt University. He also received an honorary doctorate from the Technical University of Cluj-Napoca in 2022.

At EPFL, he has held numerous leadership roles:

- Director of LMS (2008–present)
- Director of the Civil Engineering Section (2012–2022)
- Member of the ENAC School Board (2013–2022)
- Director of the Doctoral Program in Mechanics (2008–2012)
- President of the EPFL Assembly and ETH Board representative (1999–2001)

He has also served as Adjunct Professor at Duke University (2007–2024), Visiting Professor at Northwestern University (2022–2023), and held positions at Hohai University, University of Minnesota, Padova, and Montpellier.

Laloui has collaborated or supervised numerous researchers including:

- Prof. Alessandro Rotta Loria, Associate Professor of Civil and Environmental Engineering Northwestern University,
- Dr. Mathieu Nuth, Associate Professor at University of Sherbrooke,
- Dr. Bertrand François, Assistant Professor at Université Libre de Bruxelles,
- Dr. Alice Di Donna, Assistant Professor at University Grenoble-Alpes,
- Dr. Yafei Qiao, Associate Professor at Tongji University,
- Dr Roman Makhnenko, Assistant Professor University of Illinois,
- Dr. Anne-Catherine Dieudonné, Assistant Professor of Engineering Geology at Delft University of Technology
- Dr. Melis Sutman, Senior Lecturer The University of Edinburgh.

== Research ==
Laloui's research spans four principal areas.

- Energy geostructures. His group works on foundations and underground structures that also function as ground heat exchangers, integrating structural and thermal engineering.
- Bio-cementation of soils. Laloui's research on microbially induced calcite precipitation for ground improvement led to the founding of the spinoff MeduSoil.
- Geological CO2 sequestration. His group studies the underground injection and long-term monitoring of CO2 as a means of permanent carbon storage.
- Nuclear waste disposal. Laloui works on coupled thermo-hydro-mechanical modelling for underground nuclear waste repositories.

== Leadership and institutional contributions ==
Laloui was elected President of the International Society for Soil Mechanics and Geotechnical Engineering (ISSMGE) at the Society’s Council Meeting in Vienna on 14 June 2026, having previously served as its Vice President for Europe from 2022 to 2026. As President, he is leading initiatives focused on sustainability, youth engagement and knowledge transfer.

He chaired the Advisory Committee of the 2024 ECSMGE and is a member of the International Advisory Board for the 21st International Conference on Soil Mechanics and Geotechnical Engineering (ICSMGE) held in Vienna in June 2026.

He has also contributed to numerous international expert groups including NAGRA (Swiss nuclear waste agency), the International Energy Agency, and the Swiss Competence Center for Energy Research.

== Entrepreneurship and technology transfer ==
Laloui is a founder or co-founder of several startups:

- Enerdrape – geothermal panels for underground infrastructure
- Geoeg – energy geostructures for buildings
- Medusoil – bio-based soil stabilization
- Nesol – Numerical Engineering Solutions

His companies have won awards including the Swiss Top 100 Startups, Venture Kick, and AMAG Sustainability Challenge.

He also developed the commercial design software Thermo-Pile, used globally in energy pile design.

== Awards and honors ==
- Kimberly-Clark Distinguished Lectureship Award, InterPore 2026
- Member, Academia Europaea, 2024
- John Mitchell Lecturer, Deep Foundations Institute, European Federation of Foundation Contractors, 2025
- 31st Prague Geotechnical Lecture, 2025
- Doctorat Honoris Causa in Engineering, Technical University of Cluj-Napoca, 2022
- Doctorat Honoris Causa in Engineering, Heriot-Watt University, 2022
- Full Member, Swiss Academy of Engineering Sciences, 2021
- ERC Proof of Concept Grant (PoC), Construction & Environmental Biocementation in Real World Applications (CEBREWA), 2020
- ERC Advanced Grant, Biogeos, 2018
- 30th Roberval Award (2018) for the book "Mécanique des sols et Roches"
- RM Quigley Award from the Canadian Geotechnical Society, 2016
- "Excellent Contributions Award" of the International Association for Computer Methods and Advances in Geomechanics, 2008

== Honorary lectures ==
- FedIGS Lecturer, 2026
- Széchy Lecture, 2024 (the highest award of the Hungarian Geotechnical Society)
- Eshbach Lecture, 2022.
- Vienna Terzaghi Lecture, 2021
- Kersten Lecture at the American Society of Civil Engineers (ASCE), Geo-congress, 2020
- 12th G.A. Leonards Lecture from Purdue University, 2014

== Selected works ==
- Laloui, L.; Rotta Loria, A. (2020). Analysis And Design of Energy Geostructures: 1st Edition: Theoretical Essentials And Practical Application. Academic Press. ISBN 9780128206232.
- Laloui, L.; Ferrari, A. (2018). Energy Geotechnics. Springer International Publishing. doi:10.1007/978-3-319-99670-7. ISBN 978-3-319-99669-1.
- Laloui, L.; Ferrari, A. (2017). Advances in Laboratory Testing And Modelling of Soils And Shales (ATMSS). Springer International Publishing. doi:10.1007/978-3-319-52773-4. ISBN 978-3-319-52772-7.
- Laloui, L.; Di Donna, A.; Kong, G. (2016). 能源地下结构 Energy Geostructures. China Architecture and Building Press. ISBN 978-7-112-19661-6. OCLC 1051641463.
- Vulliet, L.; Laloui, L.; Zhao, J. (2016). Mécanique des sols et des roches. Presses Polytechniques Universitaires Romandes. ISBN 978-2-88074-961-3.
- Laloui, L.; Di Donna, A. (2015). Géostructures Énergétiques. Hermes science Publications. ISBN 978-2-7462-4577-8.
- Laloui, L.; Di Donna, A. (2014). Energy Geostructures: Innovation in Underground Engineering. Wiley-ISTE. ISBN 9781848215726.
- Laloui, L (2013). "Bio- And Chemo- Mechanical Processes in Geotechnical Engineering". Géotechnique. 63 (3): 189–90.

== Selected keynote lectures ==
- Bio-cementation: Transforming Scientific Discoveries into Market Solutions. ENAC Research Day, EPFL
- Bio-cementation: Transforming Scientific Discoveries into Market Solutions. 5th International Conference of Environmental Geotechnology, Recycled Waste Materials and Sustainable Engineering (@ 56 minutes 30 seconds), Warsaw
- In-situ evaluation of the performance of a thermoactive underground station, 5th Madrid Subterra, Madrid.
- Sustainable (geo)-energies: From waste storage to renewable energy production, Doctorate Honoris Causa, Cluj-Napoca University, Romania
- Energy Geotechnology: A New Era for Geotechnical Engineering, Kersten lecture, Minneapolis
