= Biographical Dictionary of Civil Engineers =

Series of three volumes

- Book cover, first volume
- Editor: Alec Skempton (vol. 1)
- Language: English
- Publisher: Thomas Telford Publishing
- Publication date: 2002
- ISBN: 978-0727729392

The Biographical Dictionary of Civil Engineers in Great Britain and Ireland discusses the lives of the people who were concerned with building harbours and lighthouses, undertook fen drainage and improved river navigations, built canals, roads, bridges and early railways, and provided water supply facilities. The first volume, published in 2002, covers the years from 1500 to 1830; the second one, published in 2008, covers 1830 to 1890. The third and final volume, published 2014, covers 1890 to 1920. The principal editor of the first volume was Professor A. W. Skempton, and the entries were written by a number of specialist historians.

An 18-page introduction in the first volume discusses the practice of civil engineering from 1500-1830. The work concludes with appendices discussing wages, costs and inflation, a chronology of major civil engineering works, and indices of places and names. Volume Two's introduction discusses the practice of civil engineering from 1830-1890.

== Reception ==
The dictionary has been reviewed in Construction History.

== See also ==
- List of civil engineers
