= Jeremiah Edmund Bowden Jennings =

South African civil engineer

- Born: 4 September 1912; Krugersdorp, South Africa
- Died: 26 August 1979 (aged 66); Johannesburg, South Africa
- Education: University of the Witwatersrand (B. Sc.); Massachusetts Institute of Technology (M. Sc.); University of the Witwatersrand, (D. Sc, Hon.); University of Natal, (D. Sc.)

Jeremiah Edmund Bowden Jennings (4 September 1912 – 26 August 1979) was a Professor in the School of Civil Engineering at the University of Witwatersrand (Wits), South Africa and its head of department from 1954 until his retirement in 1976.

In recognition of his contribution to geotechnical practice in South Africa, the South African Institute of Civil Engineering's Geotechnical Division hosts an annual Jennings Lecture. The JE Jennings Award is given annually to the author of a meritorious geotechnical engineering publication by a South African.

== Background ==
Jennings was born in Krugersdorp, near Johannesburg in South Africa, on 4 September 1912. At nine he developed asthma which hampered his schooling and followed him for the rest of his life. He was married to Majorie in 1939 and had three daughters and a son. He died on 29 August 1979 after a short period in hospital.

He went to school in Newcastle (Northern Natal), later graduating from the University of the Witwatersrand in Johannesburg with a BSc degree in civil engineering in 1933. After graduating, he joined the South African Irrigation Department for a brief period before returning to the University of Witwatersrand as a junior lecturer in the Civil Engineering Department.

In 1935, he studied soil mechanics under Karl Terzaghi and Arthur Casagrande at the Massachusetts Institute of Technology obtaining a Master of Science degree in engineering. He also attended the 1st International Conference on Soil Mechanics and Foundation Engineering held in 1936 in Boston. After a brief period studying at the University of California he returned to South Africa in 1937 to work in the research section of South African Railways and Harbours.

Jennings moved to the National Building Research Institute (NBRI) in 1946 and was soon appointed the director in 1949. Despite his many duties as director, he remained in control of the Soil Mechanics and Foundation Engineering Division. In 1954, the University of Witwatersrand appointed Jere Jennings to the Kanthack Chair of Civil Engineering and head of department.

At Wits, he introduced full courses in soil mechanics and geology into the undergraduate curricular and several postgraduate courses. His research interests predominantly revolved around expansive clays, collapsible sands, dolomite sinkholes and tailings dams. He remained an active consultant working on various deep opencast mining operations, foundations for concrete headgears, forensic investigations of tailings dam failures and deep excavations. He worked closely with the engineering geologist A.B.A Brink

Jennings was awarded the degree of DSc in Engineering, Honoris Causa, by the University of Witwatersrand in 1978. In the same year he also received a DSc in Engineering from the University of Natal for a thesis based on his published work.

== Contributions ==
The Revised Guide to Soil Profiling for Civil Engineering Purposes in Southern Africa soil, written by Jennings, A.B.A. Brink and A.A.B. Williams, is the basis for all geotechnical site investigation practice in southern Africa. This guide requires soils be profiled according to moisture condition, colour, consistency, structure, soil type and origin, for which the mnemonic MCCSSO was coined. He also contributed significantly to the early understanding of heaving clays, helping to organise the 1st and 2nd International Conference on Expansive Soils in Texas in 1965 and 1969, respectively, and the 3rd in Haifa in 1973.

Jennings was spokesperson for South Africa at the 2nd International Conference on Soil Mechanics Foundation Engineering (ICSMFE) held in Rotterdam in 1948. He was instrumental in forming the Soil Mechanics and Foundation Engineering Division of SAICE, and is considered one of the founding members of the International Society of Soil Mechanics and Foundation Engineering (ISSMFE). The 1st African Regional Conference on Soil Mechanics and Foundation Engineering, held in Pretoria in 1953, was organised under his direction. He served as Vice-President for Africa of the ISSMFE from 1957 until 1961.

He not only contributed to the wider civil engineering fraternity, as the youngest President of SAICE in 1948, but also the wider engineering fraternity by actively participating in the Professional Engineers Joint council formed in 1961, to advance professional practice. This council saw to the enactment of Professional Engineers’ Act of 1969, which detailed the requirements for professional registration of engineers. This Act was succeeded by the Engineering Profession Act of 2000 which established the Engineering Council of South Africa.

== Awards ==
Jennings’ was elected to Honorary Membership of both the South African Institute of Architects and the South African Chapter of Quantity Surveyors. He was honoured by a dedicated session at the 4th International Conference on Expansive Soils, held in Denver in June, 1980. For his contributions to civil engineering, he was awarded the SAICE Gold in 1963 and elected an Honorary Fellow of SAICE.
