= Named lecture =

A Named Lecture is an academic lecture associated with a name of a person of outstanding significance to the subject the lecture is concerned with. They are usually delivered at a predefined frequency at an academic institution. Such lectures exist for a number of academic fields and they commemorate individuals who have made significant contribution to the subject.

== List of named lectures ==
=== Engineering ===
==== Civil Engineering ====
- AGS Poulos Lecture
- ASCE Terzaghi Lecture
- BGA Géotechnique Lecture
- BGA Rankine Lecture
- Coulomb Lecture
- GS Glossop Lecture
- ICE SECED Mallet-Milne Lecture

==== Mechanical engineering ====
- ASME Timoshenko Lecture

=== Science ===
==== Computer science/information technology ====
- Wheeler Lecture

==== Physics ====
- The Welsh Lectures in Physics

=== Religion and philosophy ===
- Gifford Lectures
- Howison Lecture in Philosophy
- John Locke Lecture
- Lowell Lectures
- Neal A Maxwell Lecture
- Tanner Lectures on Human Values
