= Scott W. Sloan =

Australian civil engineering academic (1954–2019)

Professor Scott Sloan AO FAA FTSE FRS FREng
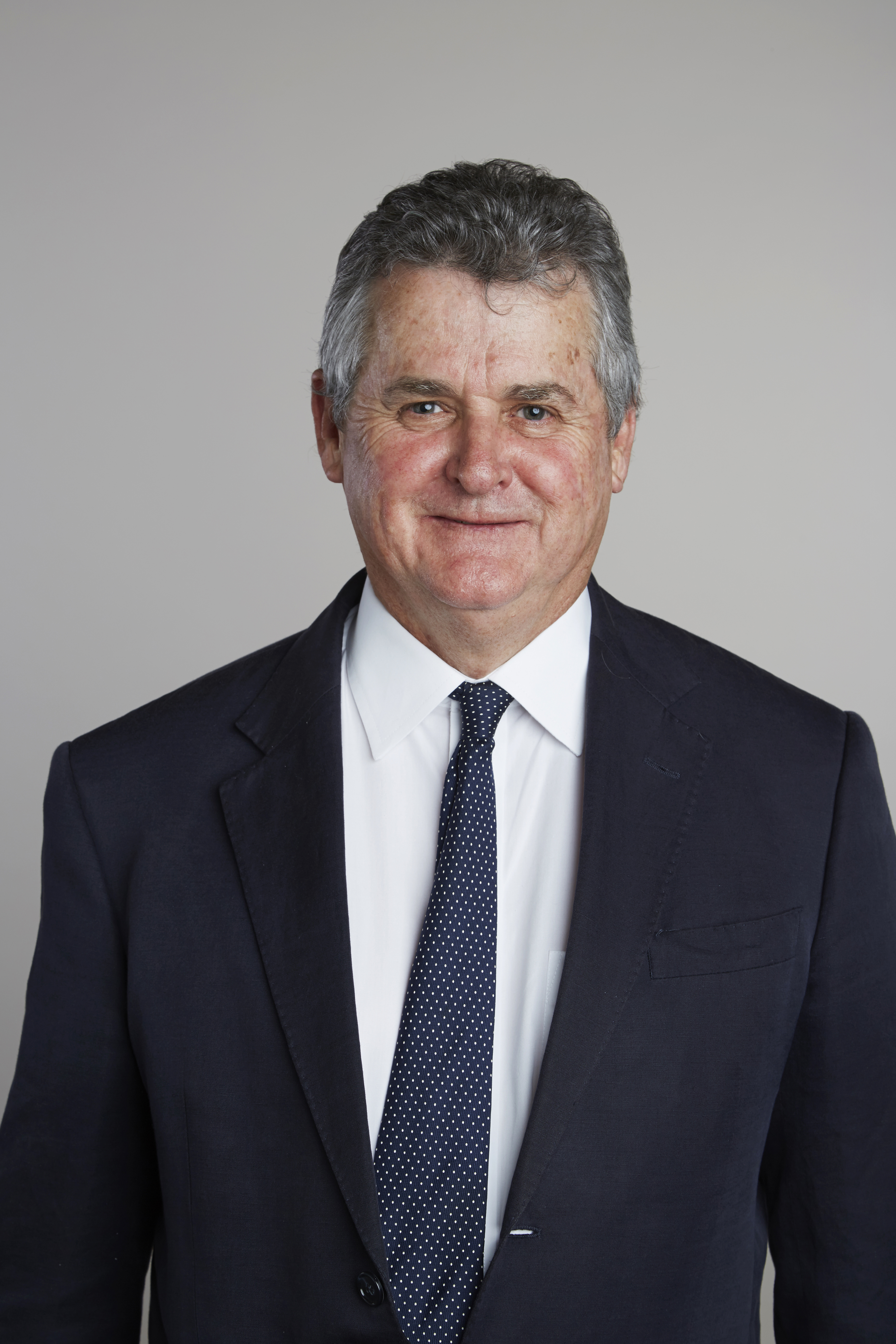
- Scott Sloan in 2015, portrait via the Royal Society
- Born: Scott William Sloan; 2 July 1954; Mildura, Victoria, Australia
- Died: 23 April 2019 (aged 64)
- Education: Monash University (BE, MEngSci); University of Cambridge (MPhil, PhD)
- Awards: Fellow of the Royal Society (2015); Fellow of the Royal Academy of Engineering (2015); Rankine Lecture (2011); Australian Laureate Fellowship (2009); Fellow of the Australian Academy of Science (2007); Fellow of the Australian Academy of Technological Sciences and Engineering (2000)
- Scientific career
- Fields: Geotechnical engineering; Computational geomechanics
- Workplaces: University of Newcastle
- Thesis: Numerical analysis of incompressible and plastic solids using finite elements (1982)
- Website: cgse.edu.au/research-team/scott-sloan; www.newcastle.edu.au/profile/scott-sloan

Scott William Sloan (2 July 1954 – 23 April 2019 was laureate Professor of Civil Engineering at the University of Newcastle.

== Education ==
Sloan was educated at Monash University where he was awarded Bachelor of Engineering and Master of Engineering degrees. He went on to study at the University of Cambridge where he was awarded a PhD in 1981 for numerical analysis of incompressible and plastic solids using finite elements.

== Awards and honours ==
In 2009, Sloan was awarded an Australian Laureate Fellowship.

Sloan was elected a Fellow of the Royal Society (FRS) in 2015. His certificate of election reads:

Professor Sloan is distinguished for the development of pioneering new methods which can be used to predict the ultimate limit states of geostructures such as tunnels, dams, highways and foundations. Being able to estimate the limit load accurately is complicated by the fact that the behaviour of geomaterials is dilatant, nonlinear, heterogeneous, anisotropic and dependent on the pore pressures and ground water conditions. His work is based on the limit theorems of plasticity, applied via novel finite element techniques. His research has made fundamental contributions to the science of geomechanics, enabling engineers to model complex geomaterial behaviour in a robust manner, leading to cheaper and safer civil infrastructure worldwide.

Sloan was named as the Government of New South Wales Scientist of the Year in 2015 and gave the Rankine Lecture in 2011.

In January 2018 Sloan was made an Officer of the Order of Australia (AO) for " distinguished service to education, particularly in the field of geotechnical engineering, as an academic and researcher, to professional associations, and as a mentor of young engineers".
