= Thomas D. O'Rourke =

American academic

Thomas Denis O’Rourke (born 1948) is an American educator, engineer and serves as the Thomas R. Biggs Professor of civil & environmental engineering at the Cornell University College of Engineering. O’Rourke took his Bachelor of Science in civil engineering at Cornell's engineering college in 1970 and his doctorate at the University of Illinois Urbana-Champaign in 1975.

== Expertise ==
O’Rourke is a geotechnical engineer and a subject-matter expert on natural disasters and their impact on the infrastructure supporting civil society. Geotechnical engineers study the Earth's near-surface crust and its performance under stress. They analyze how structures buried in the ground (such as subway systems or water and gas pipelines) behave in an environment of change. They, for instance, study underground spaces such as parking garages, skyscraper foundations and subfloors, and they also evaluate how structures made of soil and/or rock (such as earth dams, highway embankments, and levies) behave. O’Rourke served on the National Academy of Engineering team studying Hurricane Katrina and its effect on the Gulf Coast. Funded in part by the Charles L. Crandall Fund, O’Rourke reviewed the Armenia earthquake (1988), the Kobe, Japan earthquake (1995), and the Kocaeli, Turkey earthquake (1999). A specialist in geotechnical engineering including foundations, earth retaining structures, slope stability, soil/structure interaction, underground construction, laboratory testing, and elements of earthquake engineering, O’Rourke has written extensively on geotechnical, underground, and earthquake engineering. O'Rourke was an early specialist in the field of monitoring large construction projects.

== 9/11 assessment ==
O’Rourke headed the team analyzing the impact of attacks against New York City on September 11, 2001, and presented the team's findings at a National Science Foundation workshop on December 12 and 13, 2001. The workshop was organized by the Institute for Civil Infrastructure Systems, of which O'Rourke was the executive committee's co-chair. The assessment concluded that the infrastructure of New York City survived the attack remarkably well, and a study team was created to determine what attributes of American engineering led to such resilience.

== Honors ==
With respect to honors, O’Rourke received Cornell University's College of Engineering Daniel Lazar and Kenneth Goldman Excellence in Teaching Awards (2003, 1998); received the Japan Gas Association Best Paper Award (2003); was named a National Science Foundation Distinguished Lecturer and received the Trevithick Prize from the British Institution of Civil Engineers (2002); was elected a fellow of the American Association for the Advancement of Science (2000); received the Distinguished Alumnus Award in Civil and Environmental Engineering from the University of Illinois (2000); was elected to the National Academy of Engineering (1993); received the Huber Research Prize (1988); the Collingwood Research Prize (1983); and was awarded the ASTM's C.A. Hogentogler Award (1976).

The American Society of Civil Engineers (ASCE) has consistently highlighted O’Rourke's studies of the application of soil and rock mechanics to underground and excavation technologies. This peaked with the ASCE awarding the Stephen D. Bechtel Pipeline Engineering Award in 1997 (contributions to the professor of engineering) and the C. Martin Duke Award in 1995 (contributions to lifeline earthquake engineering).

O’Rourke received the 1996 EERI Outstanding Paper Award. In 1998, he was elected to the EERI board of directors and served as vice president and president (2002–2004).

O’Rourke has testified before the United States House of Representatives Science Committee (engineering implications of the 1999 Turkey and Taiwan earthquakes and, in 2003, on the National Earthquake Hazards Reduction Program). He served on many earthquake reconnaissance missions, as well as holding the United States patent for new pipeline designs. O’Rourke has developed solutions for foundation performance, structure ground movement effects, earth retaining structures, pipelines, earthquake engineering, tunneling, and infrastructure rehabilitation. He assisted in development of advanced polymer and composite materials for the rehabilitation of infrastructure distribution systems. He developed techniques to evaluate ground movement patterns and stability for excavation, tunneling, microtunneling, and mining systems. He developed strategies to reduce damage during earthquakes, analyze and design high pressure pipelines, and established testing facilities for both transmission and distribution pipelines. O’Rourke developed geographical information systems and network analysis procedures for water supply systems in areas vulnerable to earthquakes and other natural disasters.

In 2009 O'Rourke delivered the 49th Rankine Lecture at Imperial College London, entitled "Geohazards & Large Geographically Distributed Systems".

== Pedagogy ==
O’Rourke's teaching at Cornell University focuses on achieving three objectives:

- consolidation of the proper conceptual, scientific and analytical capabilities for the engineering technologies addressed in his courses,
- achievement of a practical overview and appreciation of the factors affecting projects in the real world, and
- development of design skills that build on the two elements, above.

O’Rourke is known for involving his students, including undergraduate scholars, in design projects. Such projects include the Washington D.C. Metro System, Superconducting Super Collider, Channel Tunnel, and the Boston Central Artery. Students work in project teams and produce reports that are evaluated with respect to technical content and professional presentation. He even brings practicing engineers in to participate in the design projects to provide professional practice insight. Field trips are conducted to actual sites when appropriate to develop student skills in observation, data collection, and site characterization.

== Sample publications ==
- O'Rourke, T. D. (Sept. 2003) World Trade Center Disaster: Case Study of Complexity and Network Interdependence - Royal Institute of International Affairs
- O'Rourke, T. D. (Nov. 2002) Lessons Learned from the World Trade Center Disaster for Critical Infrastructure - Public Lecture Sponsored by University of Newcastle upon Tyne
- O'Rourke, T. D. (May, 2004) Stabilizing the Boston Central Artery - of California at Berkeley, Distinguished Lecture Series
- O'Rourke, T. D. (Feb./2002) Earthquake Impacts on New York City - EERI Annual Meeting
- O'Rourke, T. D. (December 2002) Lessons Learned from the World Trade Center Disaster for Critical Lifeline Systems - 8th US/Japan Workshop on Earthquake Resistant Design of Lifeline Facilities

== Member ==
O’Rourke is a member of the American Society of Civil Engineers (ASCE), Earthquake Engineering Research Institute (EERI). He joined the Phi Kappa Psi fraternity at Cornell, and through that organization, the Irving Literary Society. O'Rourke is a Fellow of the Royal Academy of Engineering (FREng) and is a member of the National Academy of Engineering (NAE).
