= David Hight =

British geotechnical engineer (born 1943)

David Hight FRS FREng FICE
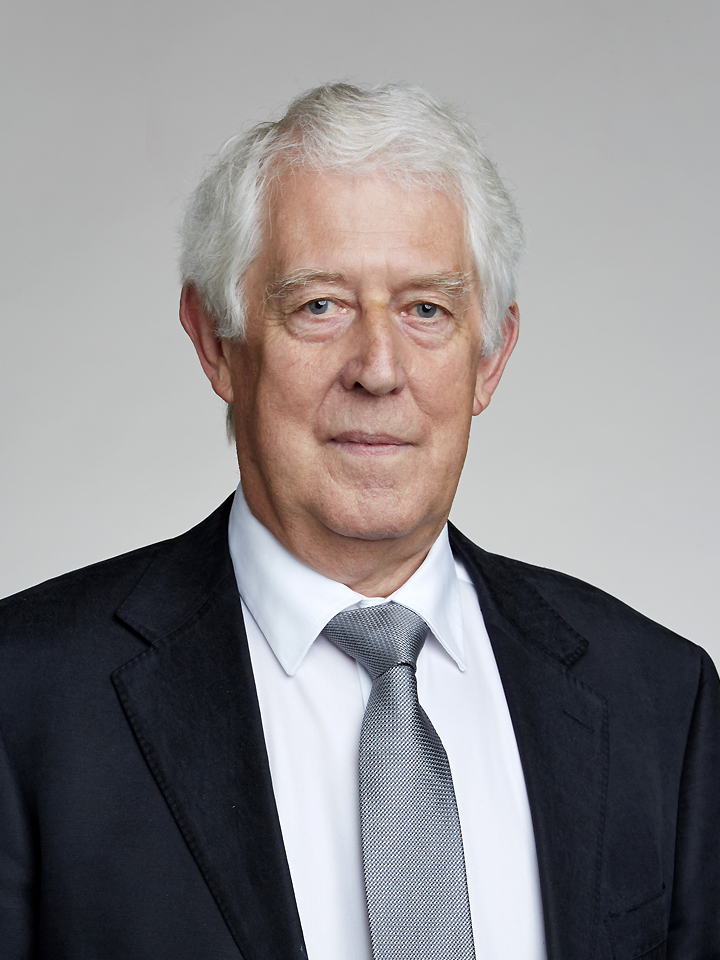
- Hight in 2016
- Born: 17 August 1943 (age 83); Maidenhead, England
- Education: Imperial College London (BSc, MSc, PhD)
- Awards: Rankine Lecture (1998)
- Scientific career
- Fields: Soil mechanics; Geotechnical engineering
- Workplaces: Massachusetts Institute of Technology; Imperial College London; National University of Singapore
- Thesis: Laboratory investigations of sea-bed clays (1983)
- Academic advisors: Alan W. Bishop; John Burland
- Website: gcg.co.uk

David William Hight (born 17 August 1943) is a senior consultant at the Geotechnical Consulting Group, a company providing high-level expertise in the field of geotechnical engineering and well known for bridging the gap between research and engineering practice.

== Education ==
Hight was educated at Imperial College London, where he was awarded Bachelor of Science and Master of Science degrees followed by a PhD in 1983 carried out in the soil mechanics section of the civil engineering department, headed by Alan W. Bishop and John Burland.

== Career ==
Hight served as a lecturer at Imperial College between 1975 and 1983, and has been visiting professor at Imperial College (1993–2012), at the National University of Singapore (2000) and Massachusetts Institute of Technology (1983).

He has synthesised the causes and effects of disturbance to soil samples and introduced methods to minimise sample disturbance and to assess sample quality. This has enabled him to become an expert in characterising the real behaviour of natural soils, including quantifying their scale of anisotropy of strength and stiffness.

Using this expertise Hight has specialised in forensic engineering, investigating geotechnical failures of tunnels, embankments, road pavements, and port constructions; work that has opened up new avenues of research and led to new approaches to design and construction, including participating in the introduction of compensation grouting. He has carried out technical audits on the foundations of numerous engineering projects including Hong Kong International Airport, the Rio–Antirrio bridge in Greece and Heathrow Terminal 5.

=== Awards and honours ===
Hight was elected a Fellow of the Royal Academy of Engineering (FREng) in 2001 and a Fellow of the Royal Society (FRS) in 2016.
