= Alec Skempton =

English civil engineer

Professor Sir Alec Skempton FRS FREng
- Born: Sir Alec Wesley Skempton; 4 June 1914; Northampton, England
- Died: 9 August 2001 (aged 87); London, England
- Citizenship: United Kingdom
- Education: Imperial College London, UK
- Known for: Skempton's A & B pore water pressure coefficients bearing capacity of foundations Skempton Building
- Awards: 4th Rankine Lecture (1964); Lyell Medal (1972); IStructE; Gold Medal (1981)
- Scientific career
- Fields: Soil Mechanics
- Workplaces: Imperial College London, UK
- Academic advisors: Alfred Pippard
- Notable students: Alan W. Bishop

Sir Alec Westley Skempton (4 June 1914 – 9 August 2001) was an English civil engineer internationally recognised, along with Karl Terzaghi, as one of the founding fathers of the engineering discipline of soil mechanics. He established the soil mechanics course at Imperial College London, where the Civil and Environmental Engineering Department's building was renamed after him in 2004, and was knighted in the 2000 New Year Honours for services to engineering. He was also a notable contributor to the history of British civil engineering.

== Career ==
Skempton was born in Northampton and attended Northampton Grammar School. In 1932 Skempton went to the City and Guilds College in London to study civil engineering. After beginning work on a Goldsmiths' Company bursary-funded PhD, he joined the Building Research Station (BRS) in 1936, initially working on reinforced concrete before moving to soil mechanics in 1937, where he worked under Leonard Cooling.

The failure of an earth embankment for a reservoir at Chingford in north-east London helped highlight Skempton's insights on clay strata. Other projects included Waterloo Bridge, the Muirhead dam near Largs in Scotland, Gosport Dockyard and the Eau Brink Cut channel of the River Great Ouse near King's Lynn.

In 1945, Skempton was seconded from BRS to establish a soil mechanics course at Imperial College (recruiting Alan W. Bishop as his first member of staff), becoming a full-time lecturer there in 1946, and introducing, in 1950, the first postgraduate course in soil mechanics. In 1955, he was elevated to the chair of soil mechanics, and from 1957 to 1976 was head of department and professor of civil engineering.

He made great contributions in the field of quaternary geology and was widely consulted on problems involving landslips, foundations, retaining walls, and embankments. Notable projects included the Mangla Dam in Pakistan and the Carsington Dam failure in Derbyshire in 1984.

== Research ==
Skempton worked on many high-profile projects through his life, notably the back analysis of the Chingford reservoir failure (July 1937) and other embankment dams, including that at Chew Valley Lake, for which he designed an array of sand-drains to accelerate consolidation of the weak alluvial foundations, the first such in the UK.

In situ behaviour of natural clays was of great interest to Skempton, who wrote two papers published by the Geological Society on the geological compaction of natural clays. Among other academic writings, he formulated concepts such as that of A and B pore water pressure coefficient which is still widely used today. Many of his research documents and other writing are available in the Skempton and Bishop Archives at Imperial College.

He was a founding member of the Institution of Civil Engineers' Soil Mechanics and Foundations committee (now the British Geotechnical Association).

Skempton was also an influential contributor to the history of civil engineering. He chaired the civil engineers archive panel at ICE where he edited works on William Jessop (1979), John Smeaton (1981), regarded as the founder of civil engineering, and early fen drainage engineer John Grundy, and started work on the first volume of A Biographical Dictionary of Civil Engineers of the British Isles, eventually published in 2002.

== Honours and awards ==
=== UK ===
Skempton was a member of the Links Club of the City and Guilds College whilst at Imperial College. He delivered the 4th Rankine Lecture titled Long-term stability of clay slopes in 1964. In recognition of his soil mechanics contributions, in 2004, the department of Civil & Environmental Engineering building at Imperial College was renamed after him: the Skempton Building.

Other accolades included Fellow of the Royal Society (1961) and Founding Fellow of the Royal Academy of Engineering. Skempton also accumulated medals from the ICE (the 1968 James Alfred Ewing Medal), the Geological Society (the 1972 Lyell Medal), Newcomen Society, and a gold medal from the Institution of Structural Engineers (IStructE). He was knighted for services to engineering in the 2000 New Year Honours.

=== International ===
Skempton was elected as the second President of the International Society of Soil Mechanics and Foundation Engineering, following Terzaghi, in 1957. He also won the Terzaghi award from the American Society of Civil Engineers.

== See also ==
- Imperial College Civil & Environmental Engineering
