= Catherine O'Sullivan =

Environmental engineer and Professor

- Education: University of California, Berkeley; University College Cork
- Scientific career
- Workplaces: Imperial College London; University College Dublin
- Thesis: The application of discrete element modelling to finite deformation problems in geomechanics (2002)

Catherine O'Sullivan is an Irish environmental engineer who is Professor of Particulate Soil Mechanics and Head of the Geotechnics Section at Imperial College London. She uses discrete element modelling to understand fundamental processes in sand and soils.

== Early life and education ==
O'Sullivan is from Ireland. She was an undergraduate at University College Cork, and started a master's degree in soil mechanics. She spent six months working in a geotechnical engineering consultancy. She was awarded a scholarship to complete a master's degree in geotechnical engineering completed her doctorate at the University of California, Berkeley, where she developed discrete element methods to model granular materials. After graduating she moved to University College Dublin, where she spent two years as a College Lecturer.

== Research and career ==
In 2004, O'Sullivan joined Imperial College London as a lecturer. She was promoted to Professor in 2017. Her research considers the behaviour of granular materials, including soil and sand.

In 2023, O'Sullivan became the first woman to be editor of the Journal of Geotechnical & Geoenvironmental Engineering. She is enthusiastic about sustainability, and was involved with the development of a graduate course in geotechnical engineering for offshore renewables.

== Awards and honours ==
- 2016 Shamsher Prakash Research Award
- 2021 Imperial College London President's Awards for Teaching Innovation

== Selected publications ==
- O'Sullivan, Catherine (2011-04-06). Particulate Discrete Element Modelling: A Geomechanics Perspective (0 ed.). CRC Press. doi:10.1201/9781482266498. ISBN 978-0-429-07751-7.
- Cavarretta, I.; Coop, M.; O'Sullivan, C. (June 2010). "The influence of particle characteristics on the behaviour of coarse grained soils". Géotechnique. 60 (6): 413–423. Bibcode:2010Getq...60..413C. doi:10.1680/geot.2010.60.6.413. hdl:10044/1/14113. ISSN 0016-8505.
- Altuhafi, F.; O’Sullivan, C.; Cavarretta, I. (August 2013). "Analysis of an Image-Based Method to Quantify the Size and Shape of Sand Particles". Journal of Geotechnical and Geoenvironmental Engineering. 139 (8): 1290–1307. doi:10.1061/(ASCE)GT.1943-5606.0000855. ISSN 1090-0241.
