= Alan W. Bishop =

British engineer (1920–1988)

Alan Wilfred Bishop
- Born: 27 May 1920; Whitstable, England
- Died: 30 June 1988 (aged 68); Whitstable, England
- Citizenship: United Kingdom
- Education: Imperial College London, UK; University of Cambridge, UK
- Known for: Bishop's method of Slope stability analysis
- Awards: 6th Rankine Lecture (1966)
- Scientific career
- Fields: Soil mechanics
- Workplaces: Imperial College London, UK
- Academic advisors: Alec Skempton
- Notable students: Nicholas Ambraseys, John H. Atkinson, Peter Rolfe Vaughan, Stephen G. Evans

Alan Wilfred Bishop (27 May 1920 – 30 June 1988) was a British geotechnical engineer and academic, working at Imperial College London.

He was known for the Bishop's method of analysing soil slopes. After his graduation from Emmanuel College, Cambridge, Bishop worked under Alec Skempton and obtained his PhD in 1952 with his thesis title being: The stability of earth dams. He worked extensively in the field of experimental Soil mechanics and developed apparatus for soil testing, such as the triaxial test and the ring shear.

His contribution to the science was widely acknowledged and he was invited in 1966 to deliver the 6th Rankine Lecture of the British Geotechnical Association titled: The strength of soils as engineering materials. In October 1966 he was appointed by the Tribunal inquiring into the Aberfan Disaster of 20-21 October 1966 to manage the site investigations into the causes of the spoil slip that resulted in the loss of the lives of 144 people, of which 116 were children.

Nowadays, a part of the Soil Mechanics Laboratories at Imperial College is named after him in recognition of his long-time work at the College.

== See also ==
- Department of Civil and Environmental Engineering, Imperial College London
- Slope stability analysis
