= Allyson Lawless =

South African structural engineer

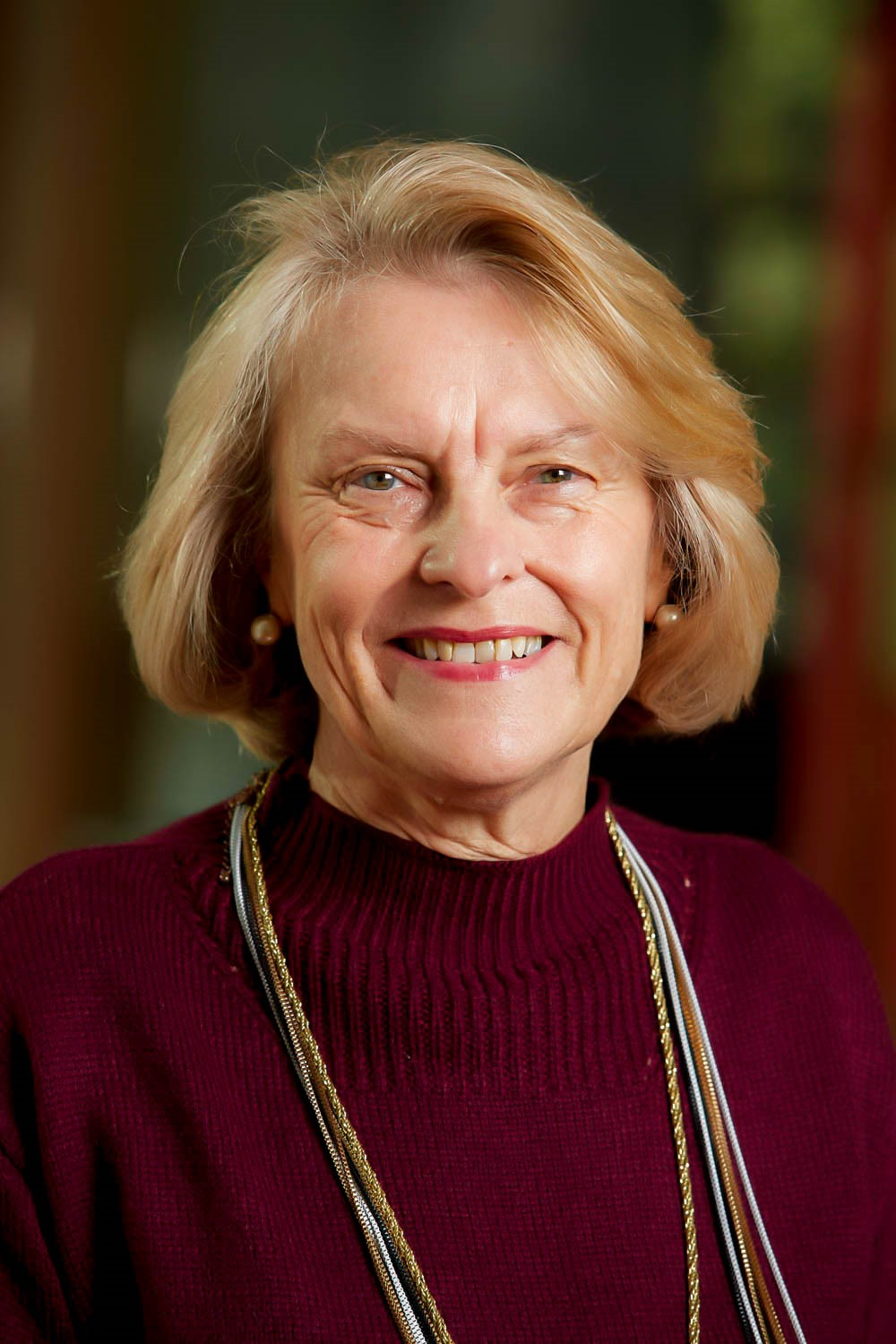
- Allyson Lawless June 2017
- Education: University of Natal, Imperial College London
- Occupation: Engineer
- Known for: Allyson Lawless and Associates
- Website: http://ally.co.za/wp/

Allyson Lawless Pr Eng, FREng, Hon. FSAICE, Hon. FIMESA, FSAAE, FIStructE, DEng (hc) is a South African structural engineer, businesswoman and an International Fellow of the Royal Academy of Engineering. In the year 2000, she was the first female in 97 years to become president of the South African Institution of Civil Engineering (SAICE)

== Education and career ==
Born in Durban in 1952, Lawless holds a Bachelor of Science in Civil Engineering from the University of Natal and a Master of Science, DIC in Structural Engineering from Imperial College, London.

Lawless’s career commenced in consulting in South West Africa (now Namibia) and later South Africa, initially designing concrete structures and later focusing on mining structures. When working in the UK, she worked for a steelwork design, fabrication and construction company.

In 1981, Lawless formed her own consulting practice at which time she developed structural engineering software for her practice, incorporating local design codes, which soon found its way into the industry. Over the next 20 years she introduced low-cost design, CAD and GIS solutions to the South African market. Although she has sold her software interests, many of the products introduced, including AllyCAD and Civil Designer are still widely used in South Africa and further afield.

When serving as the SAICE President in 2000, she became aware of the lack of support for workplace training and predicted looming skills shortages as South Africa geared up to develop substantial infrastructure for the Soccer World Cup, and to address economic growth. As a result of her research work and recommendations, she has been tasked to lead several national initiatives to design and roll out various skills and public sector technical support programmes.

She retired from this position in 2022 but continues to train and act in various advisory roles.

== Contributions and publications ==
In 2005 Lawless published the book, Numbers & Needs which foretold of the civil engineering skills challenges and in 2007 published Numbers & Needs in Local Government, which outlined the decline in technical capacity and made many recommendations to rebuild capacity and professionalise the sector. Lawless and her team contributed to the development of competence requirements for senior technical personnel which were gazetted as part of the Local Government: Municipal Staff Regulations in 2021.

Lawless was instrumental in getting the candidate phase of training recognised and funded as a learning pathway, in South Africa which has resulted in countless numbers of graduates gaining experience, coaching and mentorship toward professional registration since 2012. At this time, Lawless became an advisor to the late Adrienne Bird, a Deputy Director-General in the Department of Higher Education and Training who was tasked to develop the skills plan for the Strategic Infrastructure Projects. With input from occupational teams, they coauthored the publication Skills for and through SIPs.

In 2016, the company was appointed to research the engineering numbers and needs in the South African Development Community (SADC). The detailed report, Engineering Numbers and Needs in the SADC Region was approved by the Education and Science Ministers of the member states in 2019.

Lawless has served on many ministerial advisory panels associated with innovation, education, skills development and service delivery, on several boards and councils and on various committees of the Royal Academy of Engineering (UK), aimed at developing engineering skills in sub-Saharan Africa.

Lawless has served as a role model for young female engineers entering the field.

== Honours and awards ==
As a result of her software development and marketing efforts her name has become synonymous with civil engineering, and she was named IT Personality of the Civil Engineering Century when SAICE celebrated its centenary in 2003. In 2005 she received the SAICE Gold Medal Award for her contribution to civil engineering.

Lawless was declared the Shoprite Checkers/SABC 2 Woman of the Year in Science and Technology in 2007, was recognised by the National Science and Technology Forum (NSTF) for her ‘Contribution to Scientific, Engineering and Technological Development’ in 2008, and was awarded an honorary doctorate (DEng) by the University of Stellenbosch in 2009. She has been made a Fellow of many institutions, including an International Fellow of the Royal Academy of Engineering on 5 November 2012.
