= Peter Rolfe Vaughan =

British academic (1935–2008)

Peter Rolfe Vaughan (born 10 March 1935; died 16 May 2008) was Emeritus Professor of Ground Engineering in the Geotechnics department of Imperial College London.

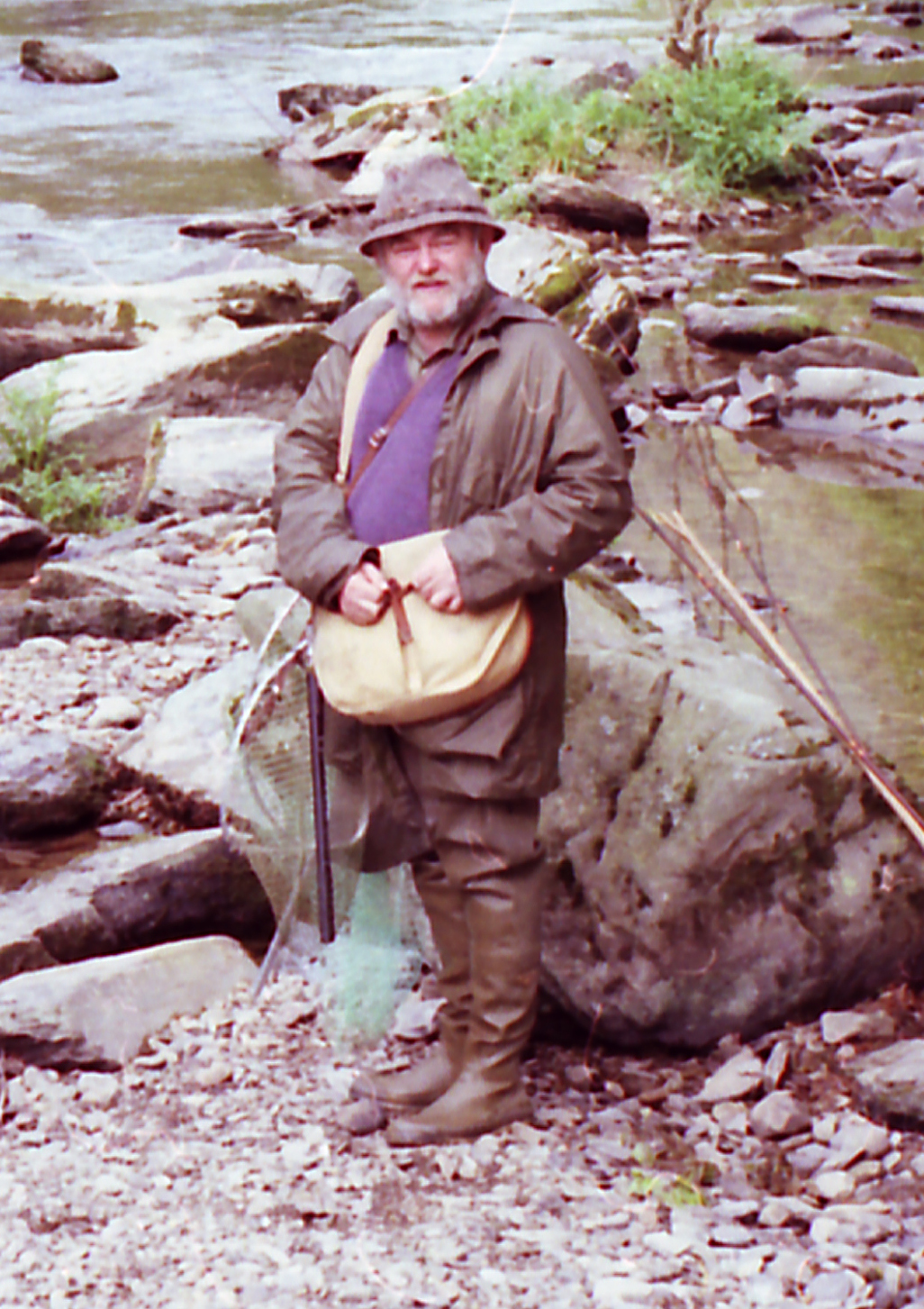
P. R. Vaughan fly fishing in 1983 at Tarr Steps, Exmoor

== Biography ==
Vaughan was born in Limbury near Luton, Bedfordshire, in the UK on 10 March 1935, the son of Ernest Alfred Vaughan, a civil servant, and Clarise Marjory Ward, a school teacher, and was educated at Luton Grammar School before going on to do a BSc at Imperial College. He played rugby for his school, the college and for the Luton Grammar School old boys team.

He graduated in 1956 and went to work for two years for Sandeman Kennard & Partners as an assistant engineer on the design of various dams in the north of England before returning to Imperial to do a diploma course in Soil Mechanics. He received his PhD in 1963 at Imperial College for his research on the instrumentation of earthworks (thesis title Field measurements in earth dams under the supervision of Alan W. Bishop) before going to work in Africa in 1964, where he was supervising engineer on the construction of the embankments of the Kainji Dam in Nigeria.

He continued to mix working in the academic environment of Imperial College with working on engineering projects in the real world for his entire career. He was project engineer for Cow Green Embankment Dam and the Balderhead Dam in the late sixties and lecturer, senior lecturer then reader in the Soil Mechanics Section of Imperial College in the seventies and eighties, becoming Professor of Ground Engineering in 1987 and emeritus professor on his retirement in 1996. During this time he carried out extensive research in subjects such as the properties of weak rocks, stiff clays, residual and other structured soils. He was an internationally recognised expert in the design and deterioration of earthworks and fills, embankment dams and natural or man-made slopes. His expertise also included seepage, residual strength and pore pressure measurement and its interpretation. His academic post at Imperial included supervising more than twenty PhD programmes and publishing some 80 papers on technical subjects. He was also an acclaimed and amusing lecturer, having given numerous lectures to international conferences and the Rankine Lecture to the British Geotechnical Association in 1994. An example of his style is given in an article published in the Guardian on Wednesday 1 February 2006:

"Much seems to depend on words; many people seem to think "reservoir" a rather unpleasant one, and Hattersley admits that he was one. My advice to any reservoir promoter is never say "reservoir", say "lake". Even better, say "wetland habitat". Better still, promote it as a leisure amenity. ("There will be bird watching, cycling, fishing, picnicking, sailing and walking and you can get it all for free if we sometimes sell some of the water to the local water undertaking.") If all else fails, ask for some extra land beside it, cut the grass short, plant 18 little flags and call it a "lateral water hazard"."

Peter Vaughan was an active consultant throughout his career. One of the founding members of Geotechnical Consulting Group he gave specialist advice to consulting firms, contractors, utilities and public authorities on a wide range of problems, such as the reconstruction of Carsington Dam after its failure during construction, and Roadford Dam, where he was a member of the advisory panel. He was involved with a review of dam performance for Ardleigh Dam, Essex, a safety review for Mica Dam, Canada, and the rehabilitation of the three dams of the Cascade of Dauga in Latvia for which he was a member of the advisory panel. He was involved extensively with the rehabilitation of old clay embankments for London Underground Limited.

He travelled widely on both consultancy work and giving lectures to international engineering bodies. His spare time was taken up with fly fishing. He never married and he died of a heart attack at his home in Suffolk on 16 May 2008.

=== Academic qualifications ===
- 1956: BSc (Eng) ACGI, Imperial College, London
- 1965: PhD, DIC University of London
- 1991: DSc, University of London

=== Professional qualifications ===
- 1991: Fellow, Royal Academy of Engineering
- 1978: Fellow, Institution of Civil Engineers
- 1970–1973, 1977–1980, 1981–1984: British National Committee on Large Dams
- 1971–1974, 1975–1977: British Geotechnical Society Committee
- 1975–1977: Geotechnique Advisory Panel
- 1972–1973: Organising Committee, British Geotechnical Society Symposium on Field Instrumentation
- 1975–1977: Chairman, Organising Committee, Institution of Civil Engineers Symposium on Clay Fills
- 1977–1980: Chairman, Organising Sub-Committee, Technical Sessions & Papers, 7th European Conf. Soil Mech. & Foundation

=== Engineering ===
- 1981–1984: ICOLD Sub-Committee Materials – Drafting Guide on Geotextiles in Dams
- 1986–1988: Working Party on Tropical Residual Soils, Geological Society of London
- 1989–1997: Technical Committee on Tropical Soils, ISSMFE
- 1994–2008: Technical Committee on Tailings Dams ISSMFE

=== Prizes ===
- 1956 – Unwin Medal, Imperial College
- 1959 – Unwin Postgraduate Prize, Imperial College
- 1962 – Trevithick Premium, Institution of Civil Engineers
- 1986, 1991, 1998 – Telford Gold Medal, Institution of Civil Engineers
- 1992, 1997: Telford Premium, Institution of Civil Engineers
- 1994 – Cooper Hill Memorial Prize, Institution of Civil Engineers
- 2001 – Geotechnical Research Medal, Institution of Civil Engineers
- 1964, 1973, 1997 – British Geotechnical Society Prize
- 1994 – Fellow of the City and Guilds of London Institute

=== Major published works ===
- Vaughan, P. R.; Wabancke, H. J. (1973). "Pore pressure changes and the delayed failure of cutting slopes in over-consolidated clay". Géotechnique. 23 (3): 531–539. doi:10.1680/geot.1973.23.4.531.
- Vaughan, P. R.; Lovenbury, H. T.; Horswill, P. (1975). "The design, construction and performance of Cow Green embankment dam". Géotechnique. 25 (3): 555–586. doi:10.1680/geot.1975.25.3.555.
- Lupini, J. F.; Skinner, A. E.; Vaughan, P. R. (1981). "The drained residual strength of cohesive soils". Géotechnique. 31 (2): 181–213. doi:10.1680/geot.1981.31.2.181.
- Vaughan, P. R.; Soares, H. F. (1982). "Design of filters for clay cores of dams". Journal of the Geotechnical Engineering Division. 108 (1): 17–32. doi:10.1061/AJGEB6.0001233.
- Vaughan, P. R.; Kwan, C.-Y. (1983). "Weathering, structure and insitu stress in residual soils". Géotechnique. 34 (1): 43–59. doi:10.1680/geot.1984.34.1.43.
- Bridle, R. C.; Vaughan, P. R.; Jones, H. N. (1985). "Empingham Dam – Design, construction and performance". Proc. Inst. Civ. Eng. Part 1 78 (April): 247–289.
- Leroueil, S.; Vaughan, P. R. (1990). "The general and congruent effects of structure in natural soils and weak rocks". Géotechnique. 40 (3): 467–488. doi:10.1680/geot.1990.40.3.467.
- Potts, D. M.; Dounias, G. T.; Vaughan, P. R. (1990). "Finite element analysis of progressive failure of Carsington embankment". Géotechnique. 40 (1): 79–101. doi:10.1680/geot.1990.40.1.79.
- Skempton, A. W.; Vaughan, P. R. (1993). "The failure of Carsington Dam". Géotechnique. 43 (1): 151–173. doi:10.1680/geot.1993.43.1.151.
- Vaughan, P. R. (1994). "Assumption, prediction and reality in geotechnical engineering". Géotechnique. 44 (4): 573–609. doi:10.1680/geot.1994.44.4.573.
- Vaughan, P. R. (1994). "Criteria for the use of weak and weathered rock for embankment fill, and its compaction control. State-of-the-art address". Proc. 13th Int. Conf. Soil Mech. & Found. Engng, Delhi. 6: 195–206.
- Dounias, G. T.; Potts, D. M.; Vaughan, P. R. (1996). "Analysis of progressive failure and cracking in old British dams". Géotechnique. 46 (4): 621–640. doi:10.1680/geot.1996.46.4.621.
- Tika, T. E.; Vaughan, P. R.; Lemos, L. J. (1996). "Fast shearing of preexisting shear zones in soil". Géotechnique. 46 (2): 197–233. doi:10.1680/geot.1996.46.2.197.
- Potts, D. M.; Kovacevic, N.; Vaughan, P. R. (1997). "Delayed collapse of cut slopes in stiff clay". Géotechnique. 47 (5): 953–982. doi:10.1680/geot.1997.47.5.953.
- Lemos, L. J. L.; Vaughan, P. R. (2000). "Clay interface shear resistance". Géotechnique. 50 (1): 55–64. doi:10.1680/geot.2000.50.1.55.
- Vaughan, P. R.; Kovacevic, N.; Potts, D. M. (2004). "Then and now: some comments on the design and analysis of slopes and embankments". In Advances in Geotechnical Engineering: The Skempton Conference (R. J. Jardine, D. M. Potts and K. G. Higgins (Eds)). 1: 241–290.
