= Jean Kérisel =

French engineer (1908–2005)

Jean Lehuérou Kérisel (18 November 1908 – 22 January 2005) was a French engineer and Egyptologist. He was a specialist in soil mechanics and geotechnics.

After studying at Ecole Polytechnique and Ecole Nationale des Ponts et Chaussées, Kérisel became a pioneer in understanding and modeling the way soil interacts with man built structures. He had a rich career, as a civil servant (he notably led the reconstruction effort in France after World War II, from 1944 to 1951), as an entrepreneur (he founded the soil mechanics engineering firm called SIMECSOL), and as a teacher and a writer. He married Suzy Caquot, the daughter of Albert Caquot, in 1931. Towards the end of his life, he applied his engineering skills to examining old buildings with a different perspective. He examined the descending corridor of the Great Pyramid of Giza in 1992.

An engineer's perspective in the field of Egyptology for instance led him to the publication of interesting theories about the Kheops pyramid and where the actual Kheops tomb might be located. Kérisel also wrote books about the "invisible art of the builder" (foundations) and "of stones and man", a set of thoughts about the skills and limitations of great builders through history. He received numerous distinctions for his work, becoming the President of the French Committee for Soil Mechanics and Foundation Engineering (1969-1973) and the President of the International Society for Soil Mechanics and Geotechnical Engineering (ISSMFE - 1973-1979). He was awarded an "honoris causa" PhD by the universities of Liege and Naples, and was honored by the Hungarian Science Academy and the British Geotechnical Association. He was Commandeur de la Legion d'honneur in France.
