= South African Institute of Civil Engineers =

Engineering organization of South Africa

The South African Institute of Civil Engineers (SAICE) is the professional body for civil engineers in South Africa. It publishes the SAICE Journal. It is a member of the Southern African Federation of Engineering Organisations (SAFEO) and the Federation of African Engineering Organisations (FAEO), which is a member of the World Federation of Engineering Organizations (WFEO).
