= International Society for Soil Mechanics and Geotechnical Engineering =

Geotechnical engineering organisation

Coordinates: 51.5273°N 0.1023°W

- Abbreviation: ISSMGE
- Formation: 1936; 90 years ago
- Type: Professional Association
- Legal status: Private company limited by guarantee
- Purpose: Professional association
- Headquarters: London, EC1; United Kingdom
- Members: 21,000
- General Secretary: Andrew McNamara
- President: Prof. Lyesse Laloui
- Main organ: Council
- Affiliations: International Union of Geological Sciences
- Website: www.issmge.org/en/
- Formerly called: International Society for Soil Mechanics and Foundation Engineering

The International Society for Soil Mechanics and Geotechnical Engineering (ISSMGE) is an international professional association, presently based in London, representing engineers, academics and contractors involved in geotechnical engineering. It is a federation of 92 member societies representing 93 countries around the world, which together give it a total of some 21,000 individual members. There are also 43 corporate associates from industry. The current ISSMGE President is Prof. Lyesse Laloui.

== History ==
The ISSMGE originated in the International Conference on Soil Mechanics and Foundation Engineering, held in June 1936 at Harvard University as one of many events held to mark the university's 300th anniversary. Arthur Casagrande of the Harvard faculty gained university support for an international conference on soil mechanics and successfully persuaded Karl Terzaghi, who was then working in Vienna, to preside. The conference attracted 206 delegates from 20 countries. The success of the five-day conference led participants to decide to establish a quadrennial International Conference on Soil Mechanics and Foundation Engineering (ICSMFE) as a permanent institution. An executive committee was set up, with Terzaghi as the first president, Casagrande as its first secretary, and Philip Rutledge, also of Harvard, as treasurer. Due to World War II, the second ICSMFE was not held until June 1948. The 1948 conference, held in Rotterdam, had 596 delegates. After the third ICSMFE was held five years later in Zurich in 1953, the organization settled into a pattern of meeting every four years. In the meantime, a first regional conference was held in Australasia in 1952.

Terzaghi was first president of the ICSMFE, serving until 1957 when he was succeeded by Alec Skempton. Casagrande succeeded Skempton, holding the presidency from 1961 to 1965.

A steering committee was established in 1981, and it became the Board in 1985. This meets annually; the Council meets every two years.

The current name, the International Society for Soil Mechanics and Geotechnical Engineering, was adopted in 1997.

ISSMGE membership has increased through its history. There were 32 member societies and 2500 individual members by 1957, 50 societies and 11,500 individuals in 1977, and 71 societies and 16,500 individuals in 1998. As of 2026, ISSMGE's reported membership totaled 21,000 individuals in 93 countries.

ISSMGE is a member of the Federation of International Geo-Engineering Societies (FedIGS).

=== ISSMGE Presidents and Secretaries-General ===
The ISSMGE Presidents over its history are as follows:

- Karl von Terzaghi (1936–1957)
- Alec Skempton (1957–1961)
- Arthur Casagrande (1961–1965)
- L. Bjerrum (1965–1969)
- Ralph Brazelton Peck (1969–1973)
- Jean Kérisel (1973–1977)
- M. Fukuoka (1977–1981)
- V. F. B. de Mello (1981–1985)
- B. B. Broms (1985–1989)
- N. R. Morgenstern (1989–1994)
- M. Jamiolkowski (1994–1997)
- K. Ishihara (1997–2001)
- W. Van Impe (2001–2005)
- P.S. Sêco e Pinto (2005–2009)
- J.L. Briaud (2009–2013)
- R. Frank (2013–2017)
- C.W.W. Ng (2017–2022)
- M. Ballouz (2022–2026)
- Lyesse Laloui (2026-2030)

The secretaries general have been as follows:

- John K.T.L. Nash (1965–1981)
- John Burland (1981)
- Richard H.G. Parry (1981–1999)
- Prof R.N. Taylor (1999–2023)
- Andrew McNamara (2023–present).

== Activities ==
The ISSMGE organises conferences on subjects including deep foundations, earthquake engineering and underground construction. Its main events continue to be the quadrennial International Conference on Soil Mechanics and Geotechnical Engineering (ICSMGE), plus five quadrennial regional conferences, Young Geotechnical Engineers' Conferences, and specialist international conferences, symposia and workshops.

In addition to a bimonthly bulletin and various technical committee reports, the society publishes an official scientific journal in collaboration with Geoengineer.org, the International Journal of Geoengineering Case Histories. This is a peer-reviewed online journal that presents reports of observations and data collected in the practice of geotechnical engineering, earthquake engineering, environmental geotechnics, and engineering geology.
