= British Geotechnical Association =

Learned society

- Abbreviation: BGA
- Formation: 1949
- Type: NGO
- Legal status: Charity
- Purpose: Professional association
- Coordinates: 51.5011°N 0.1290°W
- Website: www.britishgeotech.org
- Formerly called: British Geotechnical Society

The British Geotechnical Association is a learned 'Associated Society' of the Institution of Civil Engineers, based in London, England, and a registered UK charity (No. 284131). It provides a focal point for organisations and individuals interested in geotechnical engineering.

Activities include annual lectures (notably the Rankine Lecture named after William Rankine, an early contributor to the theory of soil mechanics, and the Géotechnique Lecture), monthly meetings, an annual conference, and a magazine: Ground Engineering.

The BGA is the UK member of the International Society for Soil Mechanics and Geotechnical Engineering (ISSMGE) and the International Society for Rock Mechanics (ISRM).

== History ==
Before 1948, the ICE had a committee on soil mechanics and foundations and a British national committee of the then International Society of Soil Mechanics & Foundation Engineering (ISSMFE). In October 1948, the ICE's council decided to form a British national society of the ISSMFE. It was established as an unincorporated association, the British Geotechnical Society, in early 1949, and held its first formal meeting, chaired by W.K. Wallace, in October 1949. During 1949 ICE also took on responsibility for publishing the journal Géotechnique. It became a registered charity in 1981, and became the BGA in June 2000.

== See also ==
- Rankine Lecture
- Géotechnique Lecture
