= Tram =

Street-running rail transit

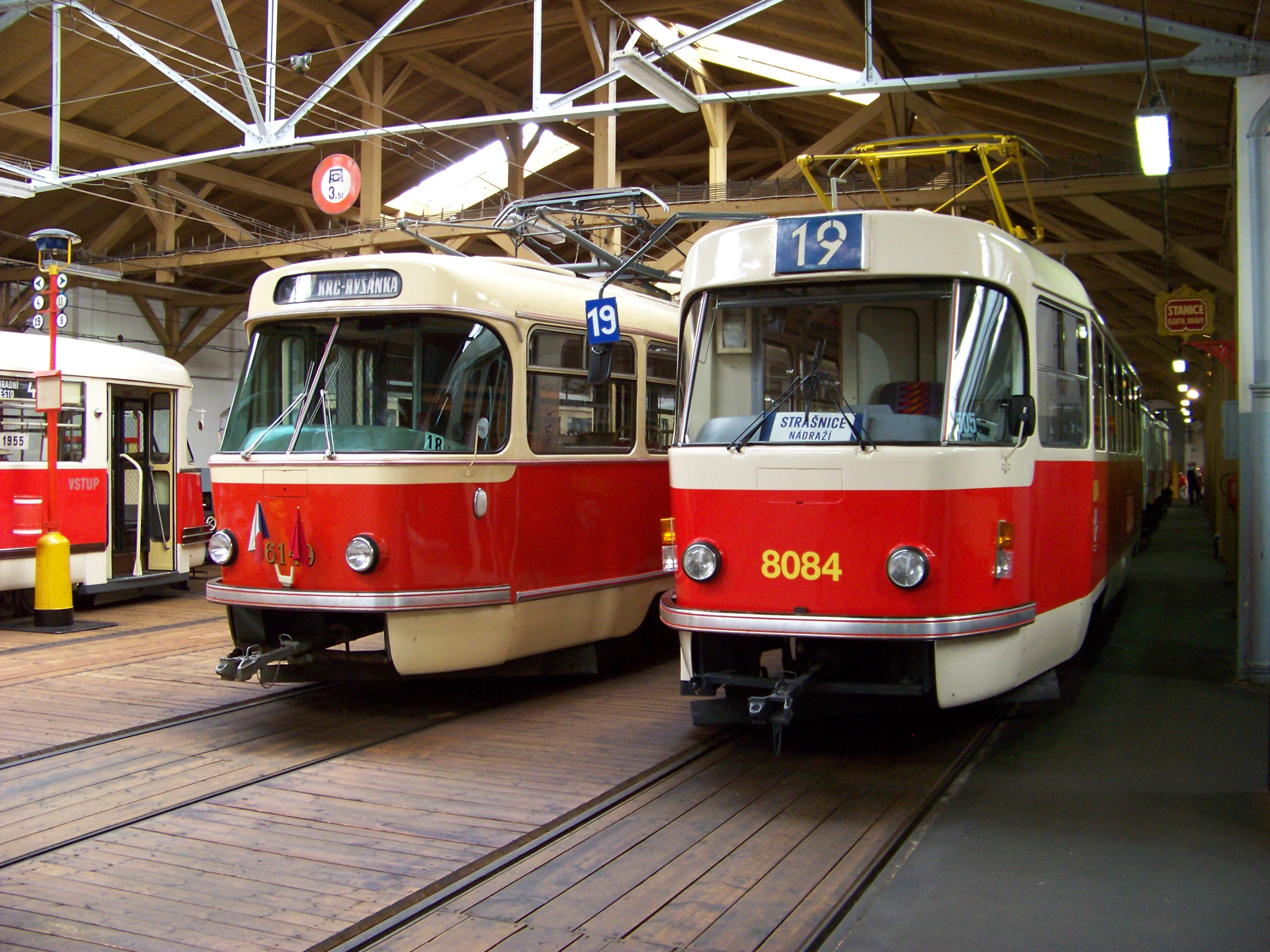
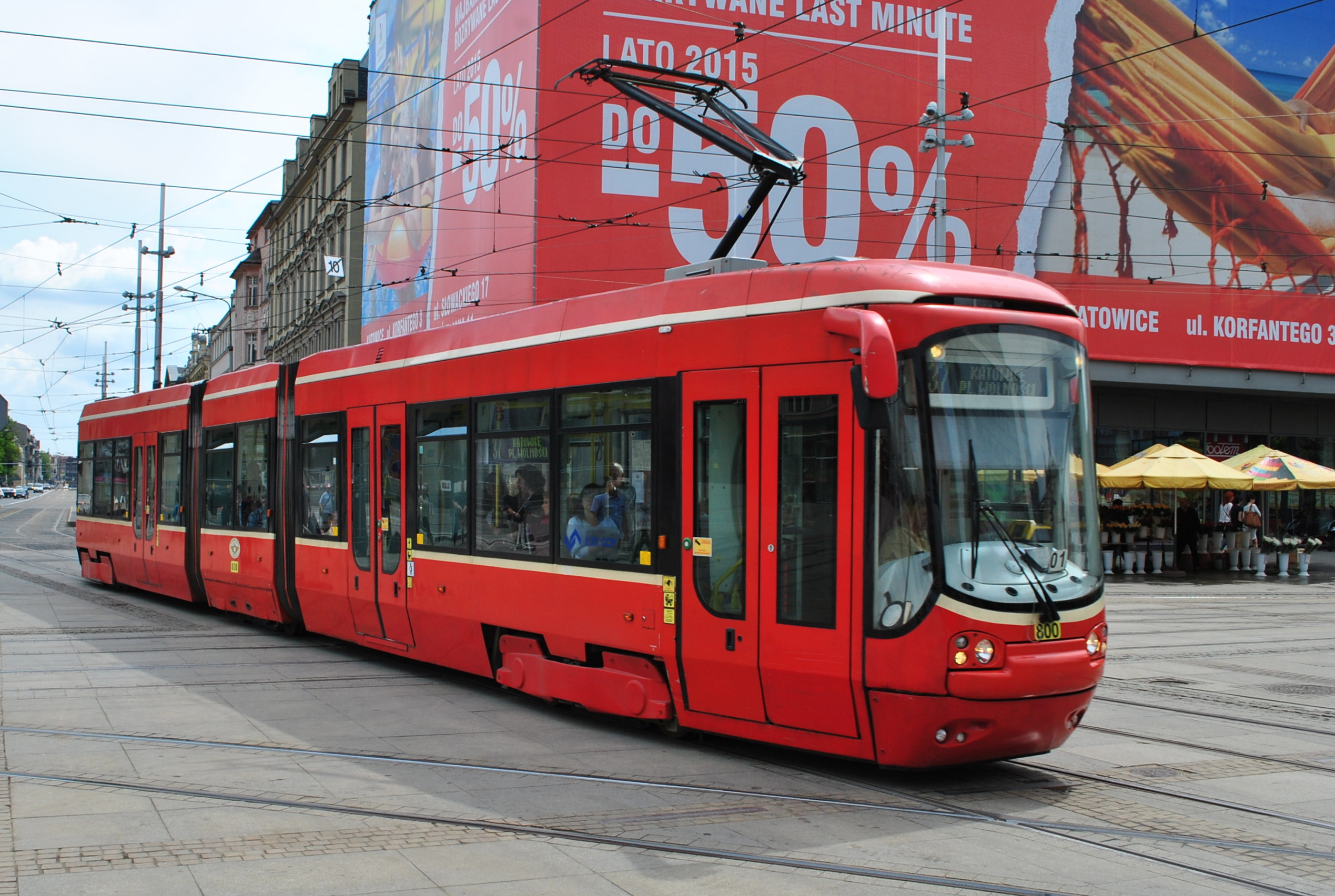
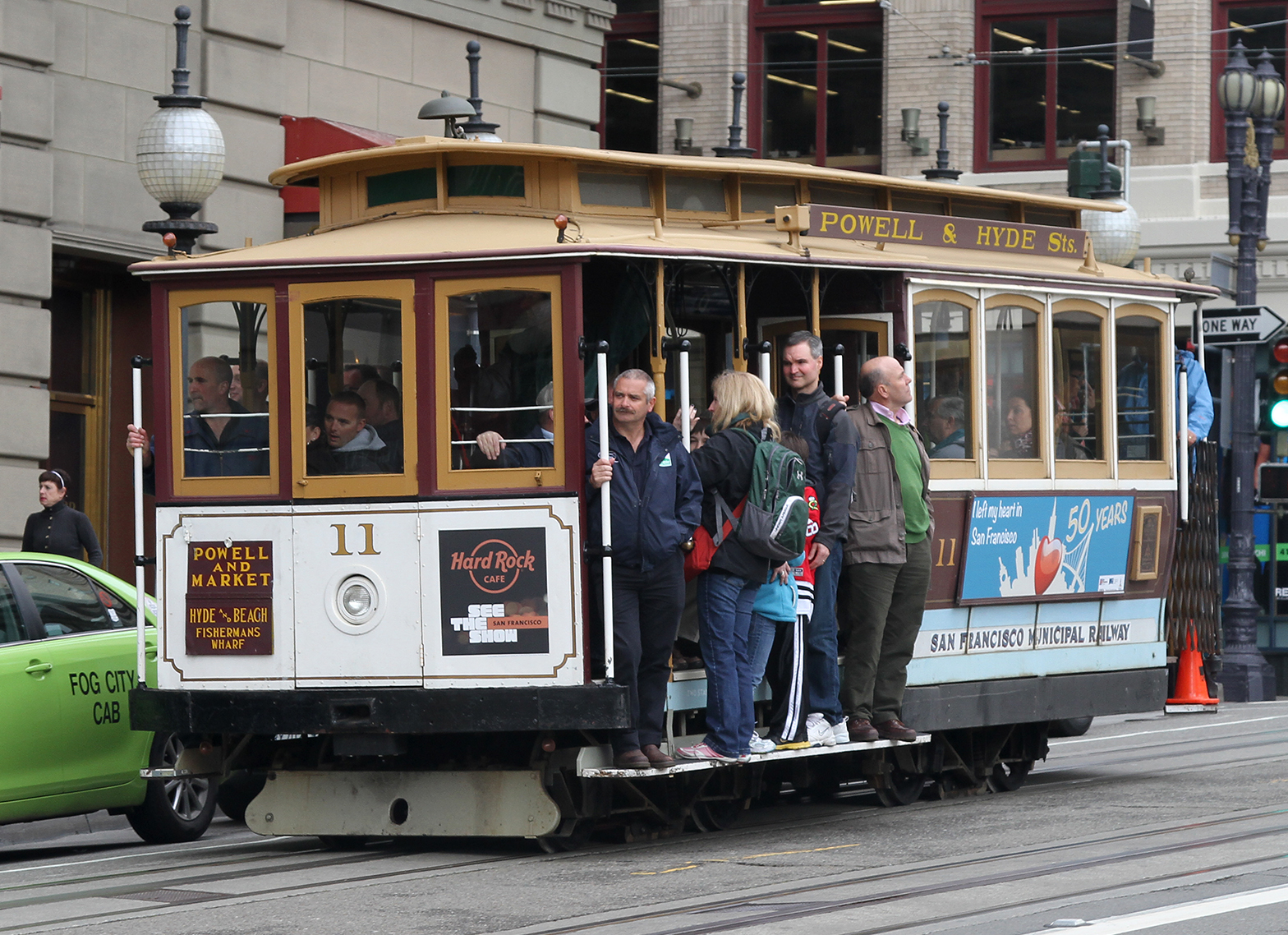
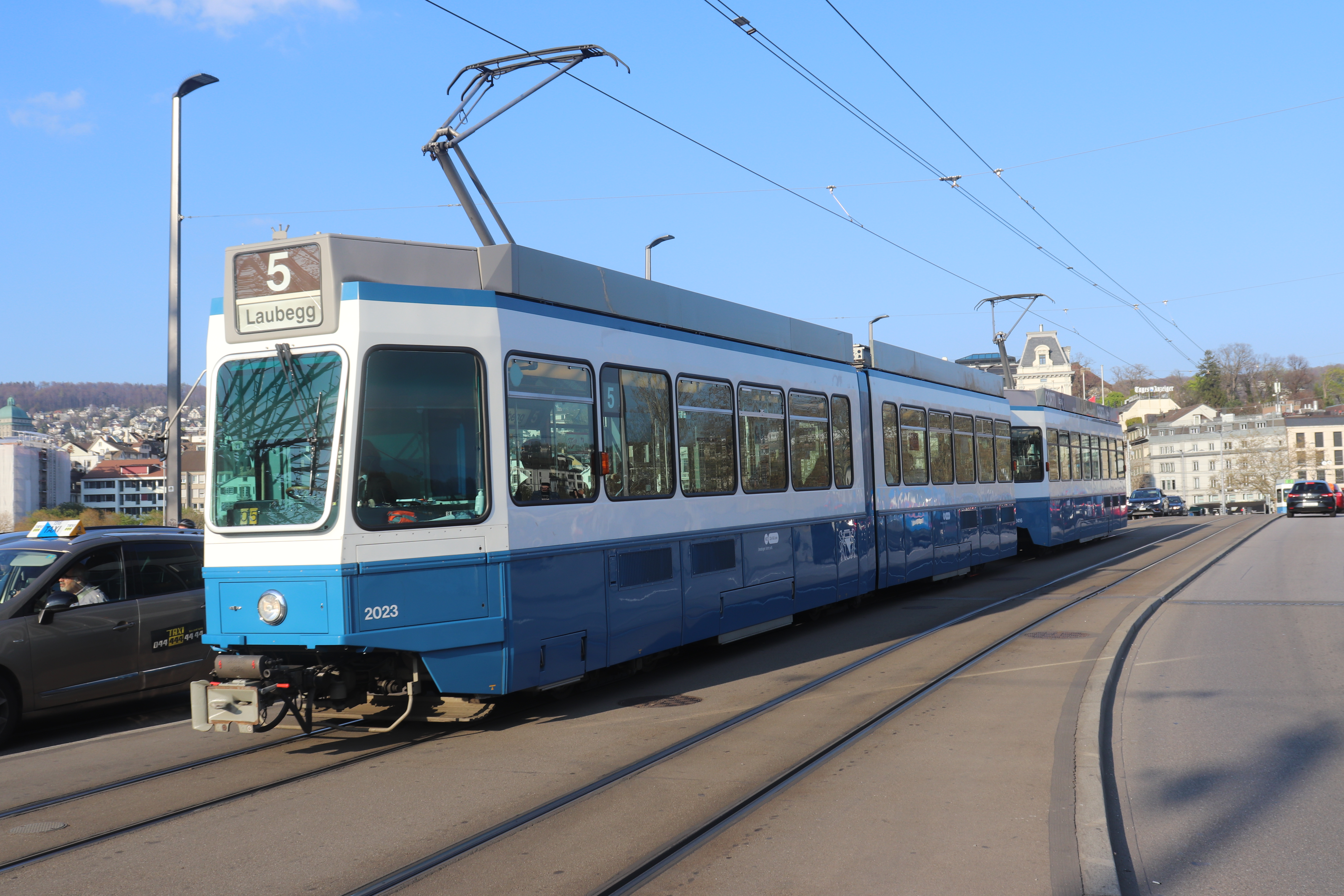
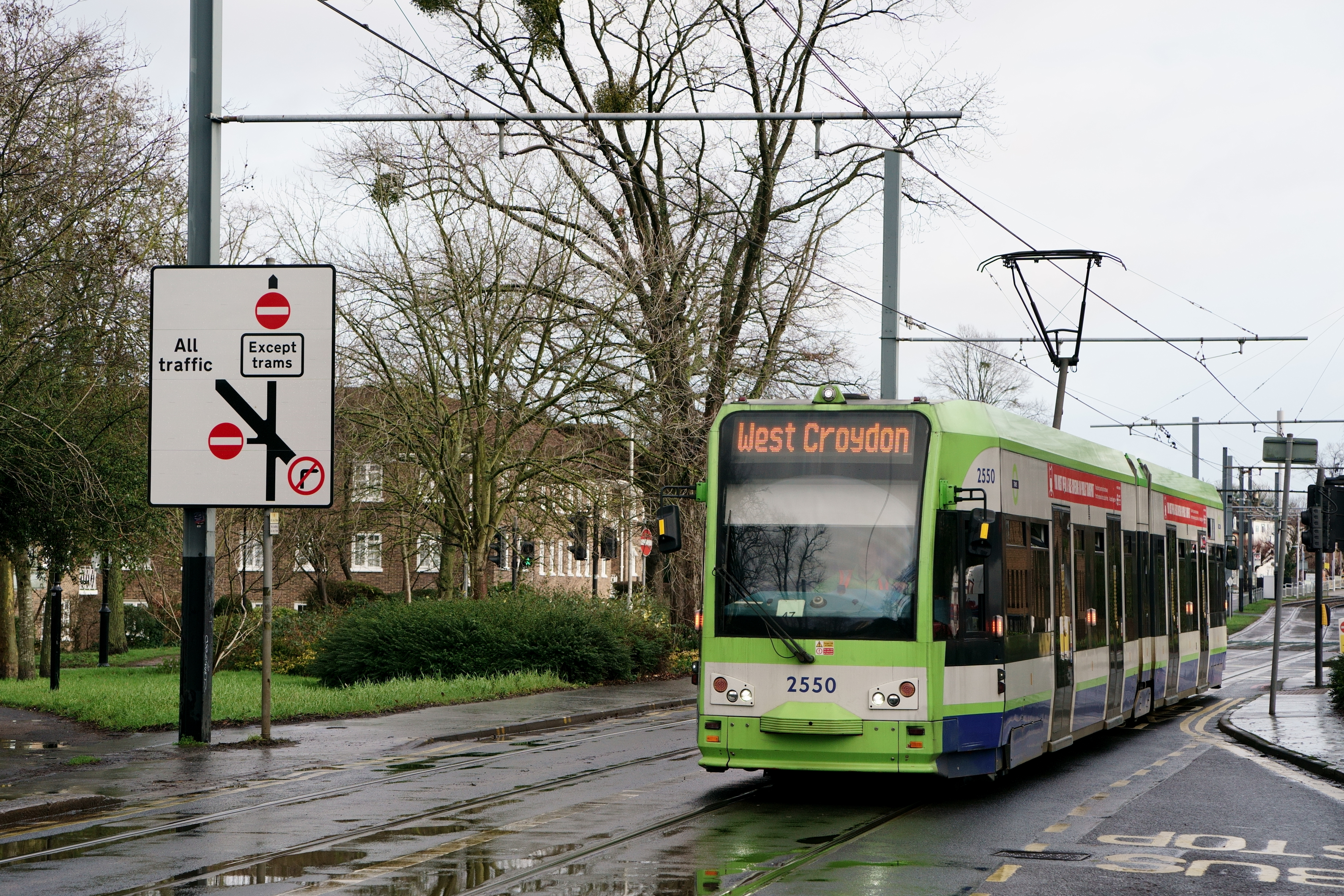
From top, left to right: Several Tatra T3s, which, with over 14,000 units, is the most-produced type in history; an Alstom Citadis 100 of the Silesian Interurbans; a historic cable car of the San Francisco cable car system; Zurich tram with multiple-unit train control; a Bombardier CR4000 of Tramlink near West Croydon.

A tram, also known as a tramcar, streetcar or trolley is a form of urban rail transit in which vehicles, whether individual railcars or multiple-unit trains, run on tramway tracks laid on or parallel to public streets, or operate in segregated right-of-ways.

Trams are a type of light rail and are generally the smallest-scale form of such rail transit; they operate in mixed traffic with other motor vehicles, provide lower local-scale capacity, and operate with limited signal-priority. However, their larger vehicle size and steel wheels allow for greater capacity and improved energy efficiency in comparison to diesel or electric buses. Their units are typically capable of forming motor coaches or motorcars, which allows for the operation of longer trains.

Trams are usually lighter and shorter than main line and rapid transit trains or metros. Most trams use electrical power, fed by a pantograph sliding on an overhead line; older systems may use a trolley pole or a bow collector. In some cases, a contact shoe on a third rail is used, or the tram runs on battery or diesel motors.

Trams are primarily operated as local public transit, but can also operate as a hybrid tram-train, running at-grade in a city center and switching to segregated right-of-ways in suburbs. Occasionally, they may also carry freight. The differences between these modes of rail transport are often indistinct, and systems may combine multiple features or operation patterns.

One of the advantages over earlier forms of transit was the low rolling resistance of metal wheels on steel rails, allowing the trams to haul a greater load for a given effort. Another factor which contributed to the rise of trams was the high total cost of ownership of horses. Electric trams largely replaced animal power in the late 19th and early 20th centuries. Improvements in other vehicles such as buses led to the decline of trams in the early to mid 20th century. However, trams have seen a resurgence since the 1980s.

== Etymology and terminology ==
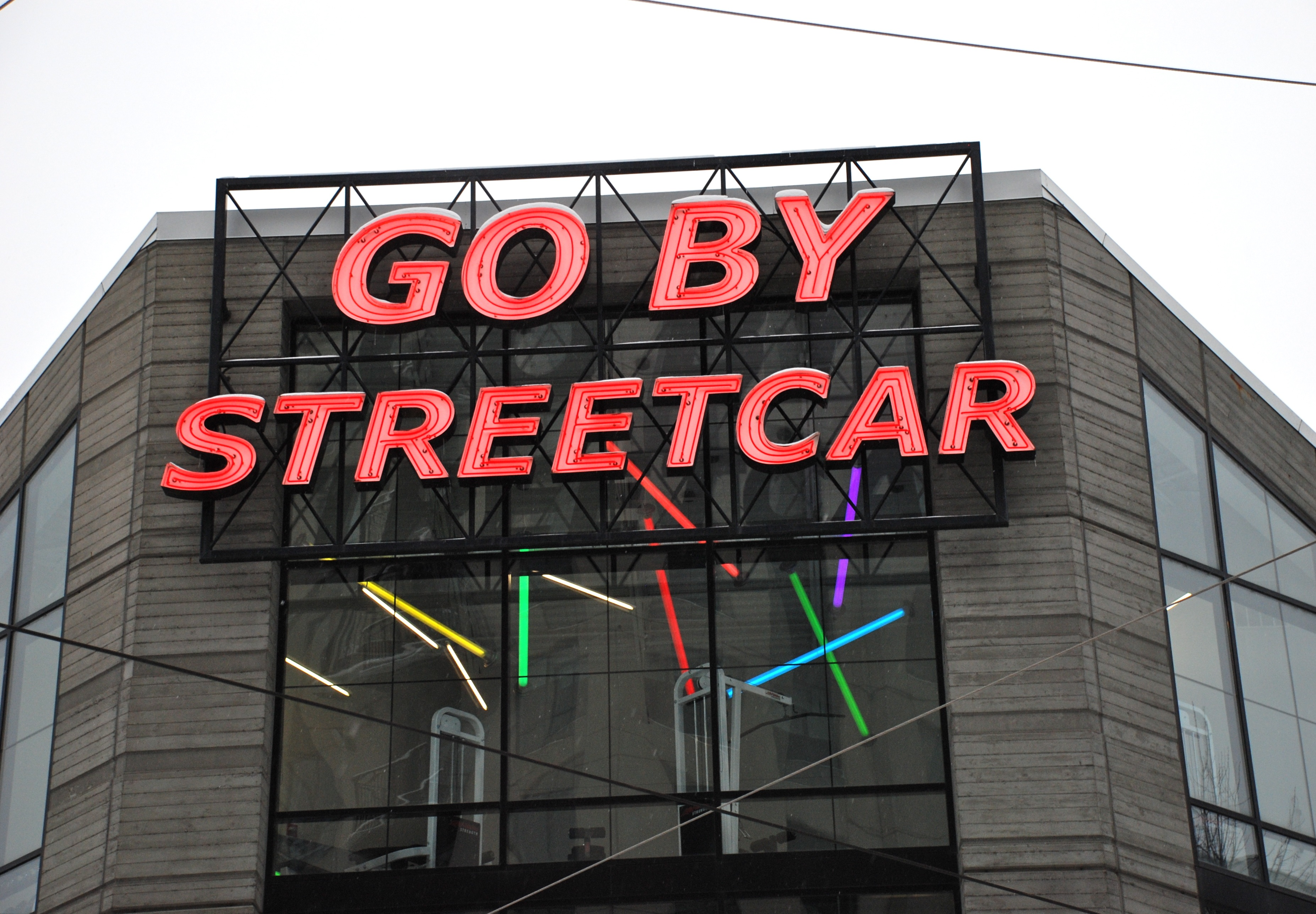
A sign in Portland that reads "go by streetcar". Trams are often called streetcars in North America.

The English terms tram and tramway are derived from the Scots word tram, referring respectively to a type of truck (goods wagon or freight railroad car) used in coal mines and the tracks on which they ran. The word tram probably derived from Middle Flemish trame ("beam, handle of a barrow, bar, rung"). The identical word trame with the meaning "crossbeam" is also used in the French language. Etymologists believe that the word tram refers to the wooden beams the railway tracks were initially made of before the railroad pioneers switched to the much more wear-resistant tracks made of iron and, later, steel. The word tram-car is attested from 1873.

=== Alternatives ===
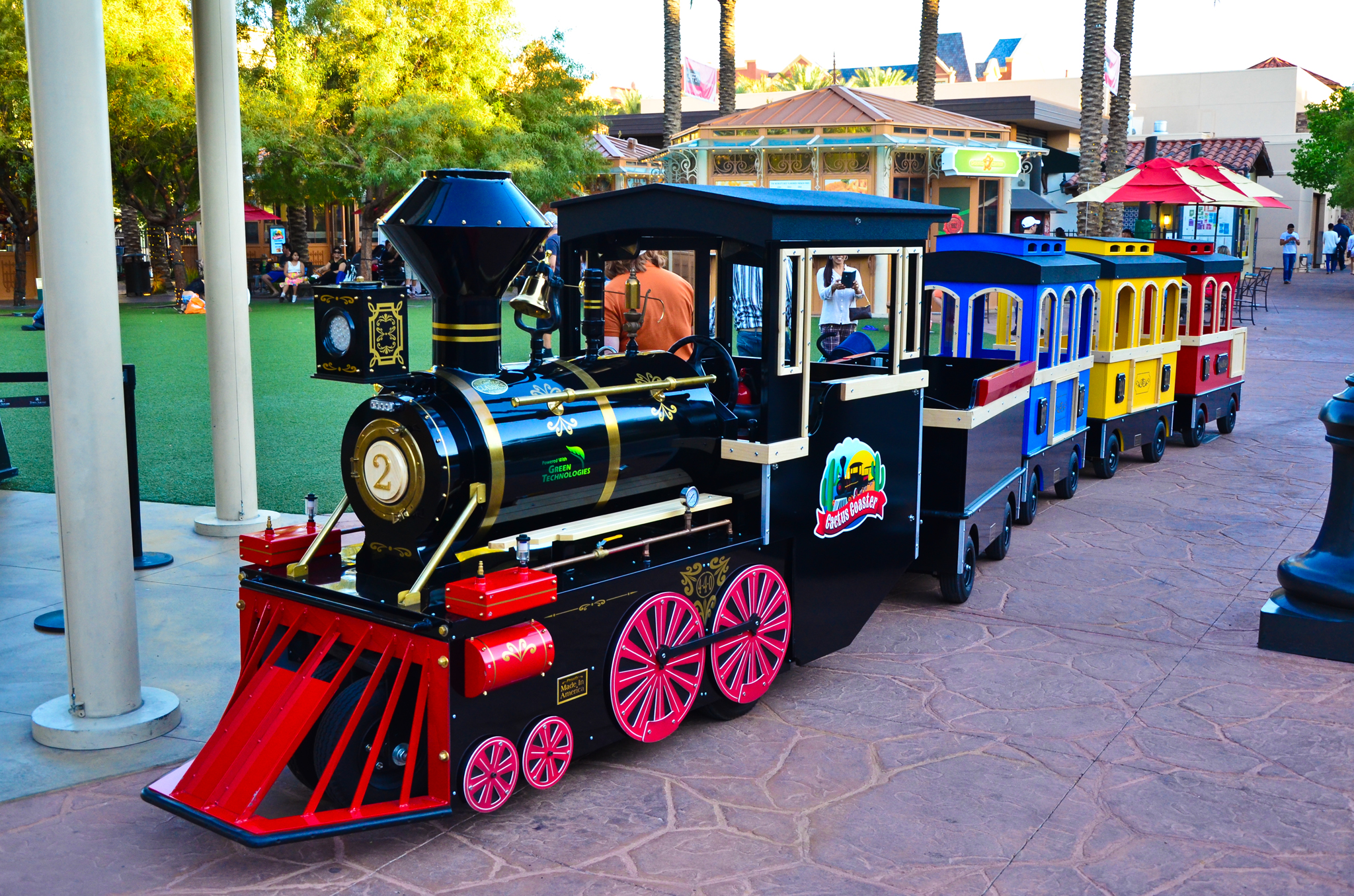
A trackless train is also called tram in U.S. English.

Although the words tram and tramway have been adopted by many languages, they are not used universally in English; North Americans prefer streetcar, trolley, or trolleycar. The term streetcar is first recorded in 1840, and originally referred to horsecars.

The terms streetcar and trolley are often used interchangeably in the United States, with trolley being the preferred term in the eastern US and streetcar in the western US. Streetcar is preferred in English Canada, while tramway is preferred in Quebec. In parts of the United States, internally powered buses made to resemble a streetcar are often referred to as "trolleys". To avoid further confusion with trolley buses, the American Public Transportation Association (APTA) refers to them as "trolley-replica buses". In the United States, the term tram has sometimes been used for rubber-tired trackless trains, which are unrelated to other kinds of trams.

A widely held belief holds the word trolley to derive from the troller (said to derive from the words traveler and roller), a four-wheeled device that was dragged along dual overhead wires by a cable that connected the troller to the top of the car and collected electrical power from the overhead wires; this portmanteau derivation is, however, most likely folk etymology. "Trolley" and variants refer to the verb troll, meaning "roll" and probably derived from Old French, and cognate uses of the word were well established for handcarts and horse drayage, as well as for nautical uses.

The alternative North American term 'trolley' may strictly speaking be considered incorrect, as the term can also be applied to cable cars, or conduit cars that instead draw power from an underground supply. Conventional diesel tourist buses decorated to look like streetcars are sometimes called trolleys in the US (tourist trolley). Furthering confusion, the term tram has instead been applied to open-sided, low-speed segmented vehicles on rubber tires generally used to ferry tourists short distances, for example on the Universal Studios backlot tour and, in many countries, as tourist transport to major destinations. The term may also apply to an aerial ropeway, e.g. the Roosevelt Island Tramway.

=== Trolleybus ===
Although the use of the term trolley for tram was not adopted in Europe, the term was later associated with the trolleybus, a rubber-tired vehicle running on hard pavement, which draws its power from pairs of overhead wires. These electric buses, which use twin trolley poles, are also called trackless trolleys (particularly in the northeastern US), or sometimes simply trolleys (in the UK, as well as the Pacific Northwest, including Seattle, and Vancouver).

== History ==
=== Creation ===
The history of passenger trams, streetcars and trolley systems, began in the early nineteenth century. It can be divided into several distinct periods defined by the principal means of power used. Precursors to the tramway included the wooden or stone wagonways that were used in central Europe to transport mine carts with unflanged wheels since the 1500s, and the paved limestone trackways designed by the Romans for heavy horse and ox-drawn transportation. By the 1700s, paved plateways with cast iron rails were introduced in England for transporting coal, stone or iron ore from the mines to the urban factories and docks.

=== Horse-drawn ===
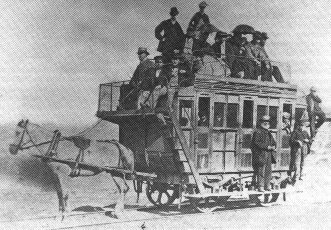
A horse-drawn tram operated by Swansea and Mumbles Railway, 1870. Established in 1804, the railway service was the world's first.

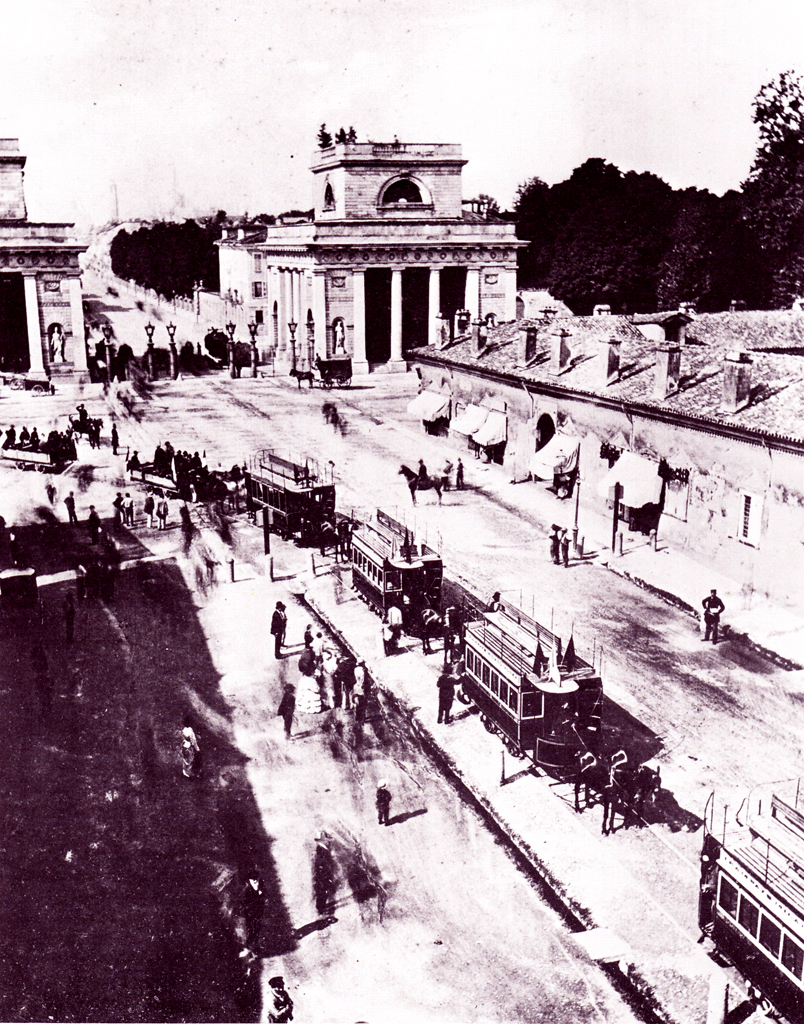
Inauguration of the Milan–Monza tramway, 1876.

The world's first passenger train or tram was the Swansea and Mumbles Railway, in Wales, UK. The British Parliament passed the Mumbles Railway Act in 1804, and horse-drawn service started in 1807. The service closed in 1827, but was restarted in 1860, again using horses. It was worked by steam from 1877, and then, from 1929, by very large (106-seat) electric tramcars, until closure in 1960. The Swansea and Mumbles Railway was something of a one-off however, and no street tramway appeared in Britain until 1860 when one was built in Birkenhead by the American George Francis Train.

Street railways developed in America before Europe, due to the poor paving of the streets in American cities which made them unsuitable for horse-drawn omnibuses, which were then common on the well-paved streets of European cities. Running the horsecars on rails allowed for a much smoother ride. There are records of a street railway running in Baltimore as early as 1828, however the first authenticated streetcar in America, was the New York and Harlem Railroad developed by the Irish coach builder John Stephenson, in New York City which began service in the year 1832. The New York and Harlem Railroad's Fourth Avenue Line ran along the Bowery and Fourth Avenue in New York City. It was followed in 1835 by the New Orleans and Carrollton Railroad in New Orleans, Louisiana, which still operates as the St. Charles Streetcar Line. Other American cities did not follow until the 1850s, after which the "animal railway" became an increasingly common feature in the larger towns.

The first permanent tram line in continental Europe was opened in Paris in 1855 by Alphonse Loubat who had previously worked on American streetcar lines. The tram was developed in numerous cities of Europe (some of the most extensive systems were found in Berlin, Budapest, Birmingham, Saint Petersburg, Lisbon, London, Manchester, Paris, Kyiv). The first tram in South America opened in 1858 in Santiago, Chile. The first trams in Australia opened in 1860 in Sydney. Africa's first tram service started in Alexandria on 8 January 1863. The first trams in Asia opened in 1869 in Batavia (Jakarta), Netherlands East Indies (Indonesia).

Limitations of horsecars included the fact that any given animal could only work so many hours on a given day, had to be housed, groomed, fed and cared for day in and day out, and produced prodigious amounts of manure, which the streetcar company was charged with storing and then disposing. Since a typical horse pulled a streetcar for about a dozen miles a day and worked for four or five hours, many systems needed ten or more horses in stable for each horsecar. In 1905 the British newspaper Newcastle Daily Chronicle reported that, "A large number of London's discarded horse tramcars have been sent to Lincolnshire where they are used as sleeping rooms for potato pickers".

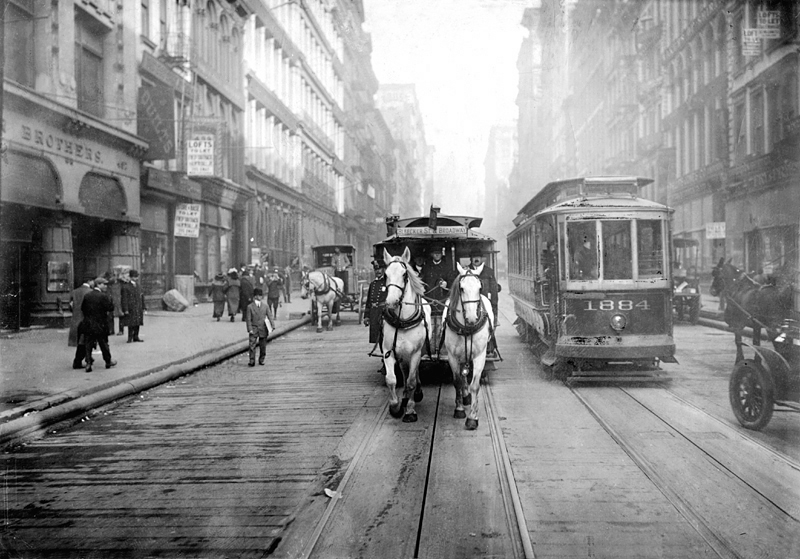
Horse-drawn trams continued to be used in New York City until 1917.

Horses continued to be used for light shunting well into the 20th century, and many large metropolitan lines lasted into the early 20th century. New York City had a regular horsecar service on the Bleecker Street Line until its closure in 1917. Pittsburgh, Pennsylvania, had its Sarah Street line drawn by horses until 1923. The last regular mule-drawn cars in the US ran in Sulphur Rock, Arkansas, until 1926 and were commemorated by a U.S. postage stamp issued in 1983. The last mule tram service in Mexico City ended in 1932, and a mule tram in Celaya, Mexico, survived until 1954. The last horse-drawn tram to be withdrawn from public service in the UK took passengers from Fintona railway station to Fintona Junction one mile away on the main Omagh to Enniskillen railway in Northern Ireland. The tram made its last journey on 30 September 1957 when the Omagh to Enniskillen line closed. The "van" is preserved at the Ulster Transport Museum.

Horse-drawn trams still operate on the 1876-built Douglas Bay Horse Tramway on the Isle of Man, and at the 1894-built horse tram at Victor Harbor in South Australia. New horse-drawn systems have been established at the Hokkaido Museum in Japan and also in Disneyland. A horse-tram route in Polish gmina Mrozy, first built in 1902, was reopened in 2012.

=== Steam ===
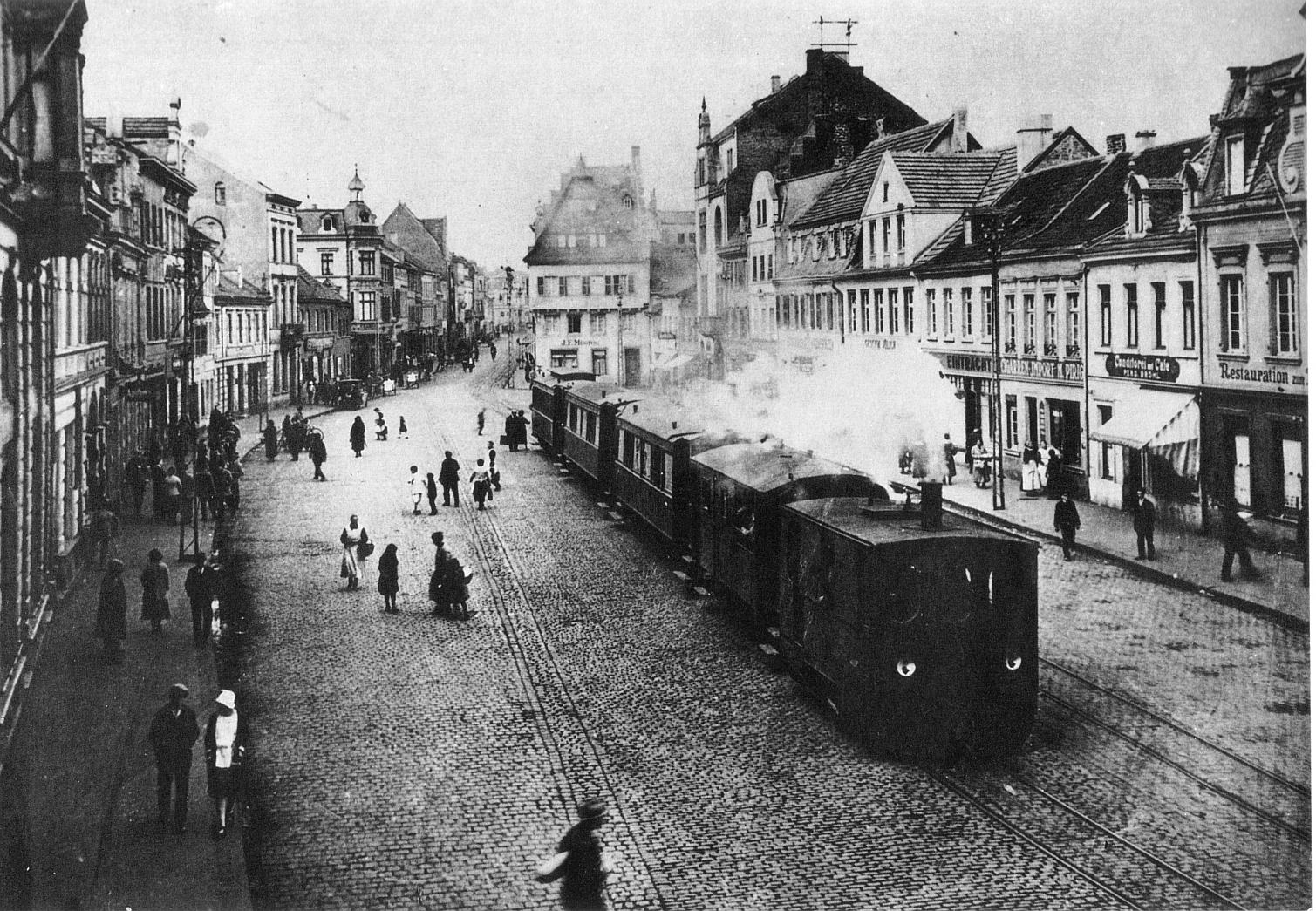
A steam tram engine from the Cologne-Bonn Railway, pulling a train through Brühl marketplace, c. 1900

The first mechanical trams were powered by steam. Generally, there were two types of steam tram. The first and most common had a small steam locomotive at the head of a line of one or more carriages, similar to a small train. Systems with such steam trams included Christchurch, New Zealand; Sydney, Australia; other city systems in New South Wales; Munich, Germany (from August 1883 on), British India (from 1885) and the Dublin & Blessington Steam Tramway (from 1888) in Ireland. Steam tramways also were used on the suburban tramway lines around Milan and Padua; the last Gamba de Legn ("Peg-Leg") tramway ran on the Milan-Magenta-Castano Primo route in late 1957.

The other style of steam tram had the steam engine in the body of the tram, referred to as a tram engine (UK) or steam dummy (US). The most notable system to adopt such trams was in Paris. French-designed steam trams also operated in Rockhampton, in the Australian state of Queensland between 1909 and 1939. Stockholm, Sweden, had a steam tram line at the island of Södermalm between 1887 and 1901.

Tram engines usually had modifications to make them suitable for street running in residential areas. The wheels, and other moving parts of the machinery, were usually enclosed for safety reasons and to make the engines quieter. Measures were often taken to prevent the engines from emitting visible smoke or steam. Usually the engines used coke rather than coal as fuel to avoid emitting smoke; condensers or superheating were used to avoid emitting visible steam. A major drawback of this style of tram was the limited space for the engine, so that these trams were usually underpowered. Steam trams faded out around the 1890s to 1900s, being replaced by electric trams.

=== Cable-hauled ===
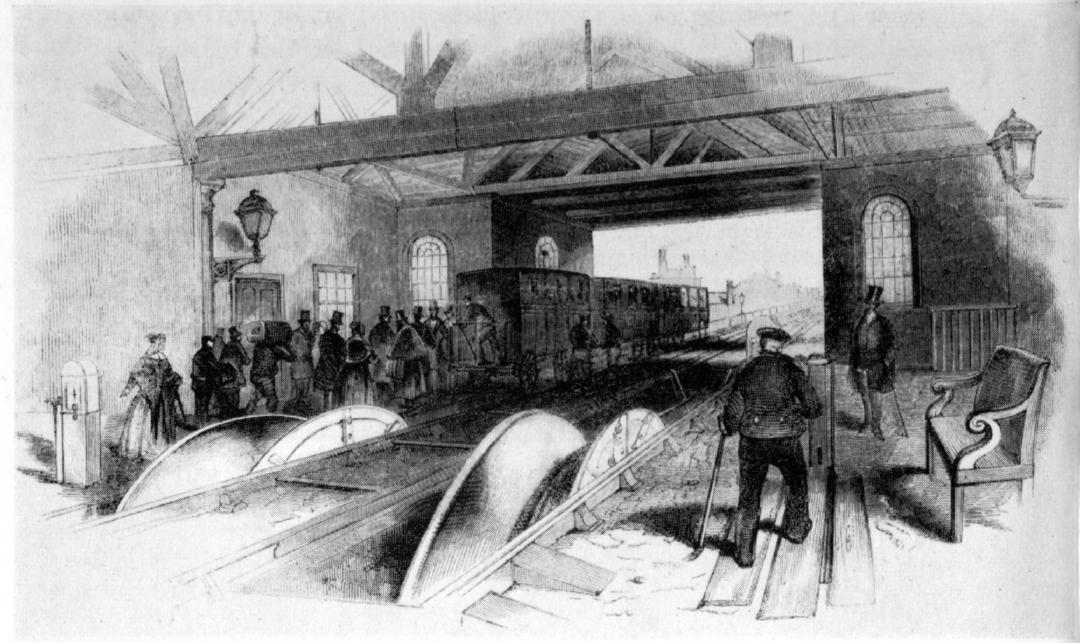
Winding drums of the London and Blackwall cable-operated railway

Another motive system for trams was the cable car, which was pulled along a fixed track by a moving steel cable, the cable usually running in a slot below the street level. The power to move the cable was normally provided at a "powerhouse" site a distance away from the actual vehicle. The London and Blackwall Railway, which opened for passengers in east London, England, in 1840 used such a system.

The first practical cable car line was tested in San Francisco, in 1873. Part of its success is attributed to the development of an effective and reliable cable grip mechanism, to grab and release the moving cable without damage. The second city to operate cable trams was Dunedin, from 1881 to 1957.

The most extensive cable system in the US was built in Chicago in stages between 1859 and 1892. New York City developed multiple cable car lines, that operated from 1883 to 1909. Los Angeles also had several cable car lines, including the Second Street Cable Railroad, which operated from 1885 to 1889, and the Temple Street Cable Railway, which operated from 1886 to 1898.

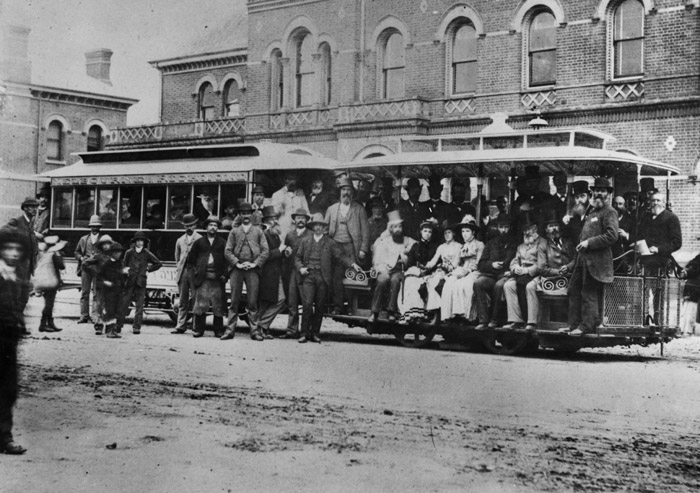
The first cable car service in Melbourne, 1885. Melbourne operated one of the largest cable car networks in the world.

From 1885 to 1940, the city of Melbourne, Victoria, Australia operated one of the largest cable systems in the world, at its peak running 592 trams on 75 kilometres (47 mi) of track. There were also two isolated cable lines in Sydney, New South Wales, Australia; the North Sydney line from 1886 to 1900, and the King Street line from 1892 to 1905.

In Dresden, Germany, in 1901 an elevated suspended cable car following the Eugen Langen one-railed floating tram system started operating. Cable cars operated on Highgate Hill in North London and Kennington to Brixton Hill in South London. They also worked around "Upper Douglas" in the Isle of Man from 1897 to 1929 (cable car 72/73 is the sole survivor of the fleet).

In Italy, in Trieste, the Trieste–Opicina tramway was opened in 1902, with the steepest section of the route being negotiated with the help of a funicular and its cables.

Cable cars suffered from high infrastructure costs, since an expensive system of cables, pulleys, stationary engines and lengthy underground vault structures beneath the rails had to be provided. They also required physical strength and skill to operate, and alert operators to avoid obstructions and other cable cars. The cable had to be disconnected ("dropped") at designated locations to allow the cars to coast by inertia, for example when crossing another cable line. The cable then had to be "picked up" to resume progress, the whole operation requiring precise timing to avoid damage to the cable and the grip mechanism. Breaks and frays in the cable, which occurred frequently, required the complete cessation of services over a cable route while the cable was repaired. Due to overall wear, the entire length of cable (typically several kilometres) had to be replaced on a regular schedule. After the development of reliable electrically powered trams, the costly high-maintenance cable car systems were rapidly replaced in most locations.

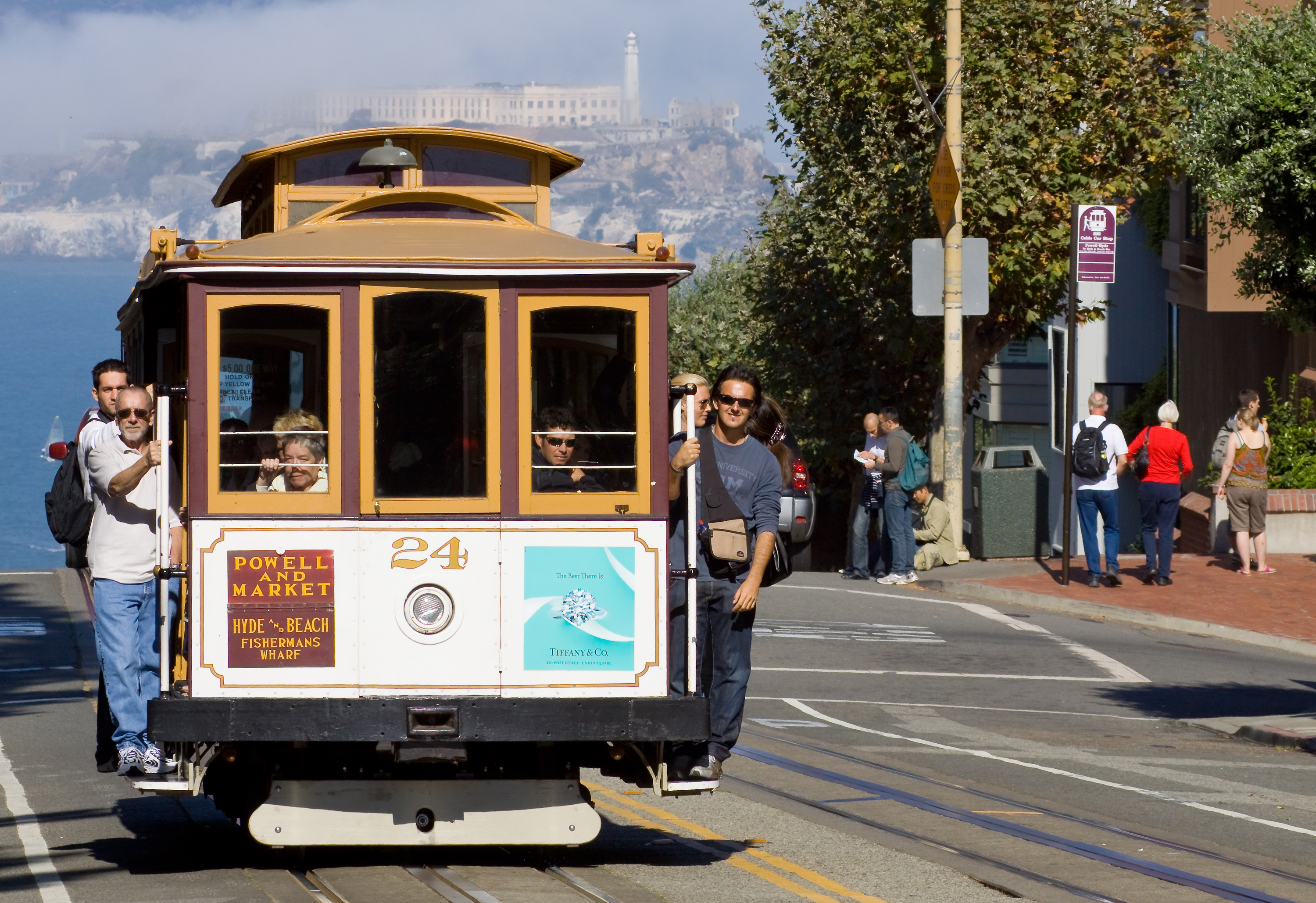
The San Francisco cable car's effectiveness on hills partially explains its continued use.

Cable cars remained especially effective in hilly cities, since their nondriven wheels did not lose traction as they climbed or descended a steep hill. The moving cable pulled the car up the hill at a steady pace, unlike a low-powered steam or horse-drawn car. Cable cars do have wheel brakes and track brakes, but the cable also helps restrain the car to going downhill at a constant speed. Performance in steep terrain partially explains the survival of cable cars in San Francisco.

The San Francisco cable cars, though significantly reduced in number, continue to provide regular transportation service, in addition to being a well-known tourist attraction. A single cable line also survives in Wellington (rebuilt in 1979 as a funicular but still called the "Wellington Cable Car"). Another system, with two separate cable lines and a shared power station in the middle, operates from the Welsh town of Llandudno up to the top of the Great Orme hill in North Wales, UK.

=== Internal combustion ===
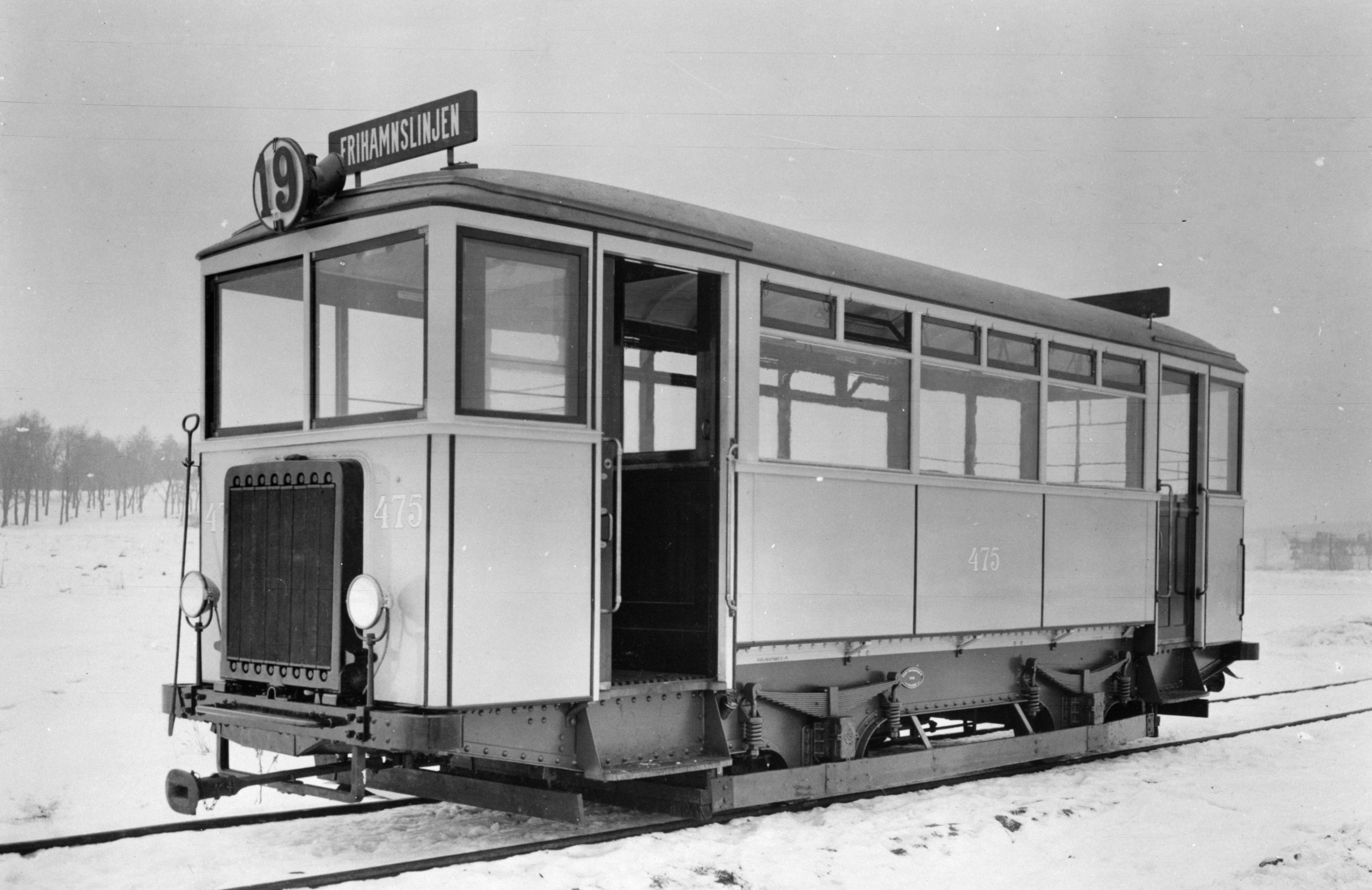
The only petrol-driven tram of Stockholms Spårvägar, on line 19, in the 1920s

Hastings and some other tramways, for example Stockholms Spårvägar in Sweden and some lines in Karachi, used petrol trams. Galveston Island Trolley in Texas operated diesel trams due to the city's hurricane-prone location, which would have resulted in frequent damage to an electrical supply system. Although Portland, Victoria promotes its tourist tram as being a cable car it actually operates using a diesel engine. The tram, which runs on a circular route around the town of Portland, uses dummies and salons formerly used on the Melbourne cable tramway system and since restored.

In the late 19th and early 20th centuries a number of systems in various parts of the world employed trams powered by gas, naphtha gas or coal gas in particular. Gas trams are known to have operated between Alphington and Clifton Hill in the northern suburbs of Melbourne, Australia (1886–1888); in Berlin and Dresden, Germany; in Estonia (1921–1951); between Hirschberg and Hermsdorf, Germany, from 1897 (now Jelenia Góra, Cieplice, and Sobieszów in Poland); and in the UK at Lytham St Annes, Trafford Park, Manchester (1897–1908) and Neath, Wales (1896–1920).

Comparatively little has been published about gas trams. However, research on the subject was carried out for an article in the October 2011 edition of "The Times", the historical journal of the Australian Association of Timetable Collectors, later renamed the Australian Timetable Association.

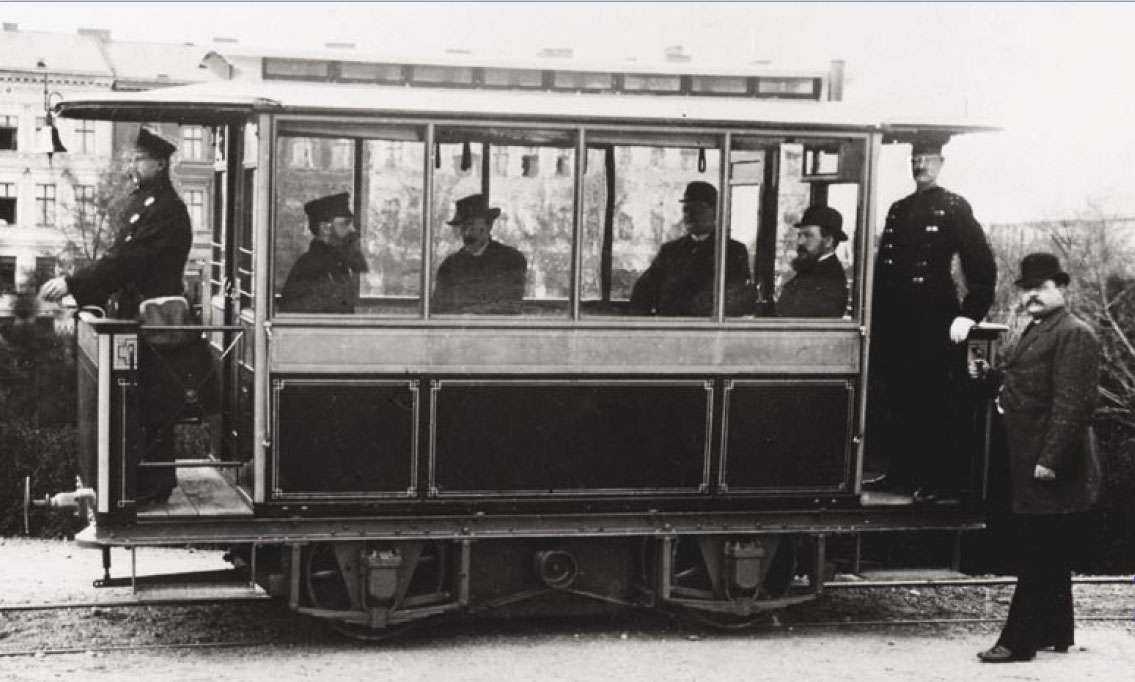
Gross-Lichterfelde Tram in Berlin in 1882. First lacking overhead wires, it became the first tram with those in 1883.

=== Electric ===
The world's first electric tram line operated in Sestroretsk near Saint Petersburg invented and tested by inventor Fyodor Pirotsky in 1875. Later, using a similar technology, Pirotsky put into service the first public electric tramway in St. Petersburg, which operated only during September 1880. The second demonstration tramway was presented by Siemens & Halske at the 1879 Berlin Industrial Exposition. The first public electric tramway used for permanent service was the Gross-Lichterfelde tramway in Lichterfelde near Berlin in Germany, which opened in 1881. It was built by Werner von Siemens who contacted Pirotsky. This was the world's first commercially successful electric tram. It drew current from the rails at first, with overhead wire being installed in 1883.

Between 1962 and 1992 Blackpool had the only urban tramway in the UK.

In Britain, Volk's Electric Railway was opened in 1883 in Brighton. This two kilometer line along the seafront, re-gauged to 2 ft 8 1/2 in (825 mm) in 1884, remains in service as the oldest operating electric tramway in the world. Also in 1883, Mödling and Hinterbrühl Tram was opened near Vienna in Austria. It was the first tram in the world in regular service that was run with electricity served by an overhead line with pantograph current collectors. The Blackpool Tramway was opened in Blackpool, UK on 29 September 1885 using conduit collection along Blackpool Promenade. This system is still in operation in modernised form.

The earliest tram system in Canada was built by John Joseph Wright, brother of the famous mining entrepreneur Whitaker Wright, in Toronto in 1883, introducing electric trams in 1892. In the US, multiple experimental electric trams were exhibited at the 1884 World Cotton Centennial World's Fair in New Orleans, Louisiana, but they were not deemed good enough to replace the Lamm fireless engines then propelling the St. Charles Streetcar Line in that city. The first commercial installation of an electric streetcar in the United States was built in 1884 in Cleveland, Ohio, and operated for a period of one year by the East Cleveland Street Railway Company. The first city-wide electric streetcar system was implemented in 1886 in Montgomery, Alabama, by the Capital City Street Railway Company, and ran for 50 years.

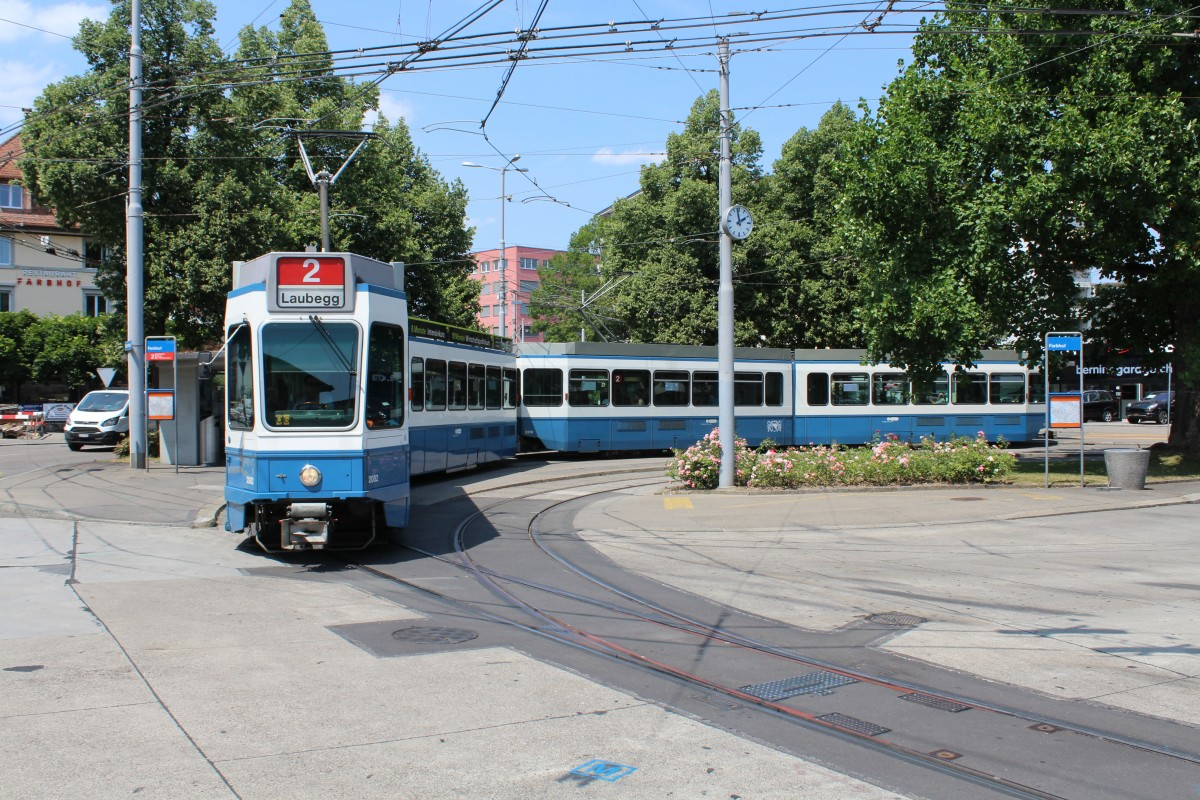
Zürich tram multiple-unit train

In 1888, the Richmond Union Passenger Railway began to operate trams in Richmond, Virginia, that Frank J. Sprague had built. Sprague later developed multiple unit control, first demonstrated in Chicago in 1897, allowing multiple cars to be coupled together and operated by a single motorman. This gave rise to the modern subway train. Following the improvement of an overhead "trolley" system on streetcars for collecting electricity from overhead wires by Sprague, electric tram systems were rapidly adopted across the world.

Earlier electric trains proved difficult or unreliable and experienced limited success until the second half of the 1880s, when new types of current collectors were developed. Siemens' line, for example, provided power through a live rail and a return rail, like a model train, limiting the voltage that could be used, and delivering electric shocks to people and animals crossing the tracks. Siemens later designed his own version of overhead current collection, called the bow collector. One of the first systems to use it was in Thorold, Ontario, opened in 1887, and it was considered quite successful. While this line proved quite versatile as one of the earliest fully functional electric streetcar installations, it required horse-drawn support while climbing the Niagara Escarpment and for two months of the winter when hydroelectricity was not available. It continued in service in its original form into the 1950s.

Sidney Howe Short designed and produced the first electric motor that operated a streetcar without gears. The motor had its armature direct-connected to the streetcar's axle for the driving force. Short pioneered "use of a conduit system of concealed feed" thereby eliminating the necessity of overhead wire and a trolley pole for street cars and railways. While at the University of Denver he conducted experiments which established that multiple unit powered cars were a better way to operate trains and trolleys.

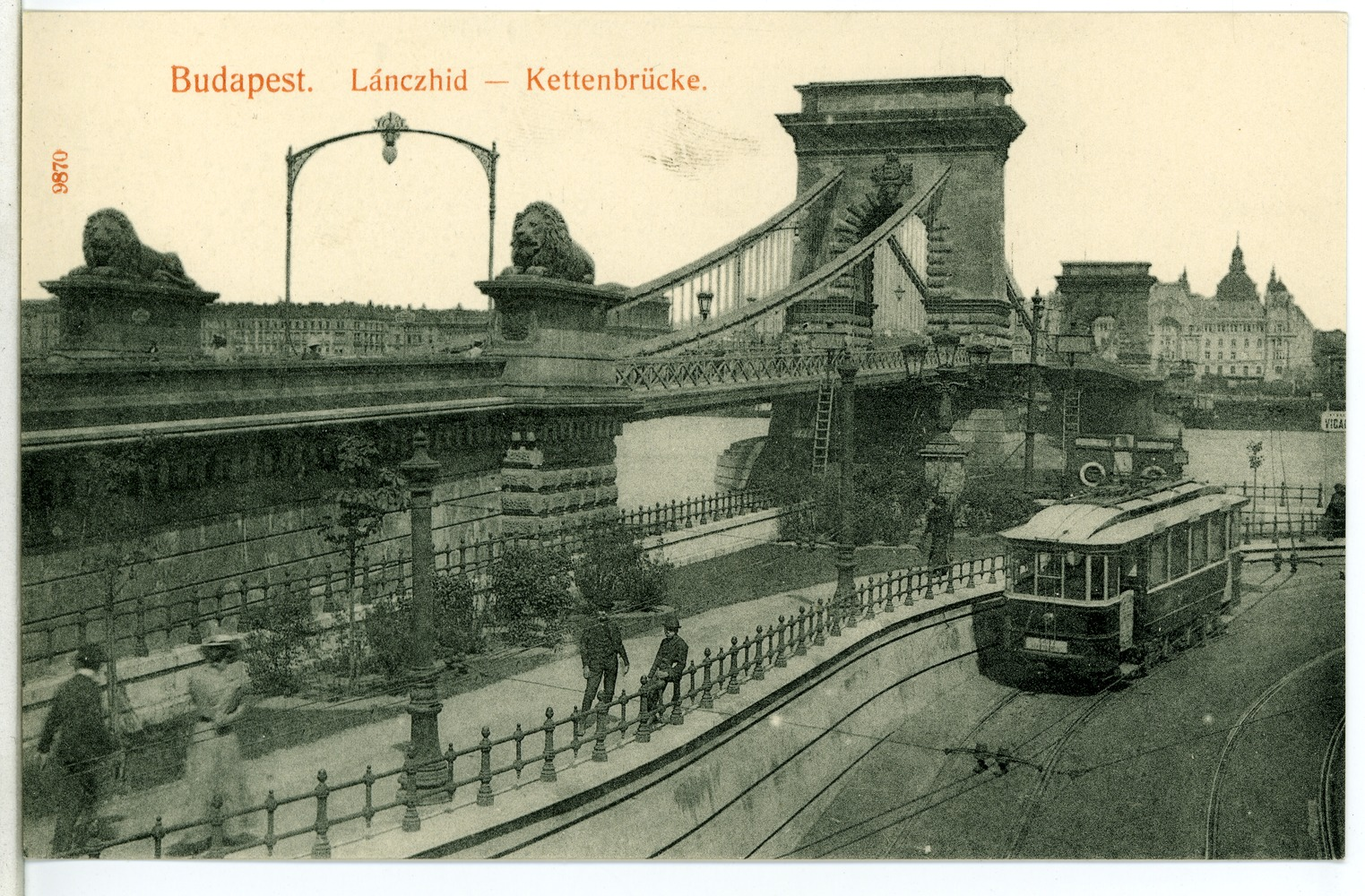
A tram in Budapest in 1908. The city established a network of electric trams in 1894.

Electric tramways spread to many European cities in the 1890s, such as:

- Prague, Bohemia (then in the Austro-Hungarian Empire), in 1891
- Kyiv, Ukraine, in 1892
- Dresden, Germany; Lyon, France; and Milan and Genoa, Italy, Douglas, Isle of Man in 1893
- Rome, Italy: Plauen, Germany; Bucharest, Romania; Lviv, Ukraine; Belgrade, Serbia in 1894
- Bristol, United Kingdom; and Munich, Germany in 1895
- Bilbao, Spain, in 1896
- Copenhagen, Denmark; and Vienna, Austria, in 1897
- Florence and Turin, Italy, in 1898
- Helsinki, Finland; and Madrid and Barcelona, Spain, Glasgow, Scotland, in 1899

Sarajevo built a citywide system of electric trams in 1895. Budapest established its tramway system in 1887, and its ring line has grown to be the busiest tram line in Europe, with a tram running once per minute at rush hour. Bucharest and Belgrade ran a regular service from 1894. Ljubljana introduced its tram system in 1901 – it closed in 1958. Oslo had the first tramway in Scandinavia, starting operation on 2 March 1894.

The first electric tramway in Australia was a Sprague system demonstrated at the 1888 Melbourne Centennial Exhibition in Melbourne; afterwards, this was installed as a commercial venture operating between the outer Melbourne suburb of Box Hill and the then tourist-oriented country town Doncaster from 1889 to 1896. Electric systems were also built in Adelaide, Ballarat, Bendigo, Brisbane, Fremantle, Geelong, Hobart, Kalgoorlie, Launceston, Leonora, Newcastle, Perth, and Sydney.

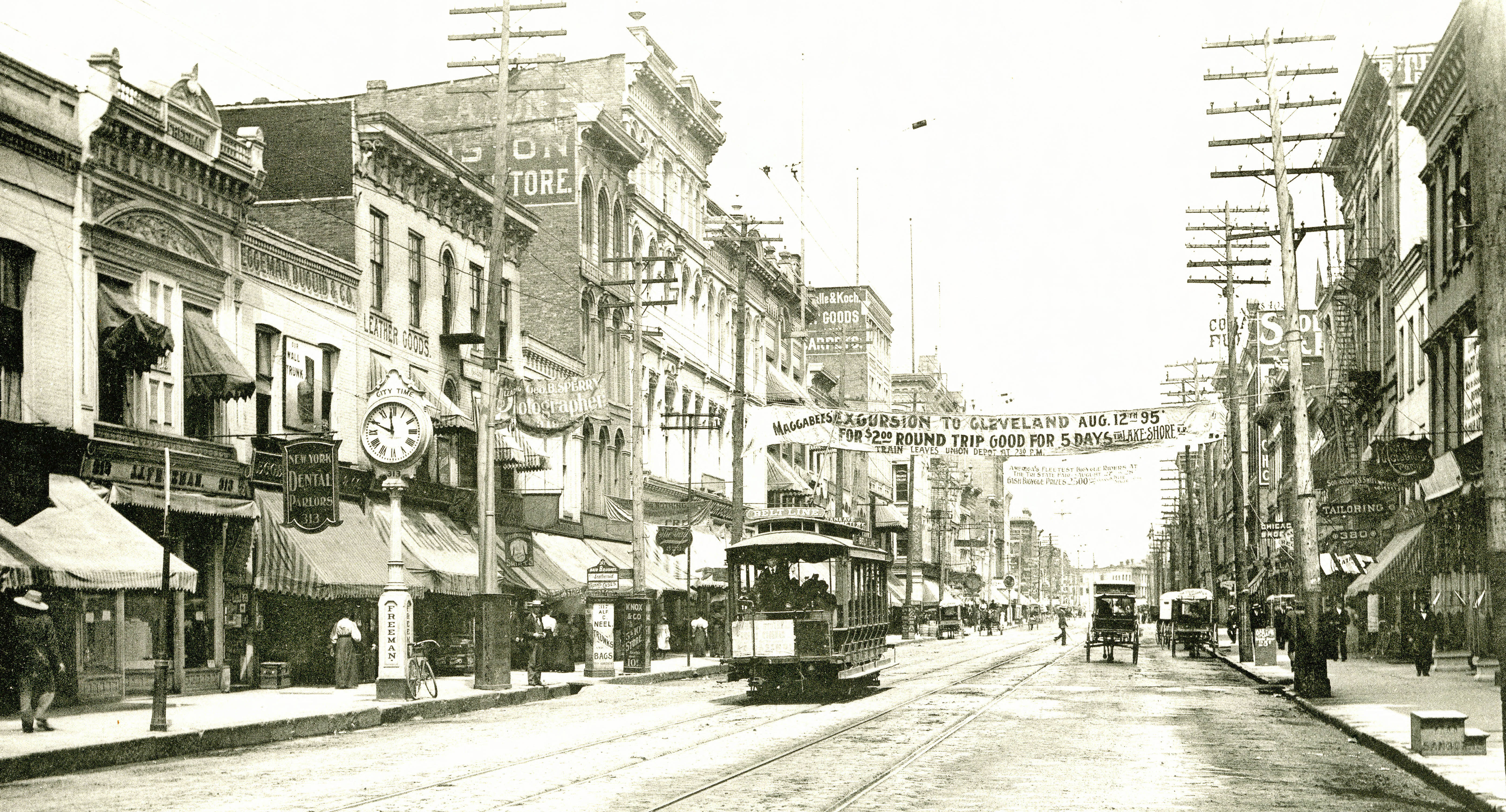
Streetcar in Toledo, Ohio, 1895

By the 1970s, the only full tramway system remaining in Australia was the Melbourne tram system. However, there were also a few single lines remaining elsewhere: the Glenelg tram line, connecting Adelaide to the beachside suburb of Glenelg, and tourist trams in the Victorian Goldfields cities of Bendigo and Ballarat. In recent years the Melbourne system, generally recognised as the largest urban tram network in the world, has been considerably modernised and expanded. The Adelaide line has been extended to the Entertainment Centre, and work is progressing on further extensions. Sydney re-introduced trams (or light rail) on 31 August 1997. A completely new system, known as G:link, was introduced on the Gold Coast, Queensland, on 20 July 2014. The Newcastle Light Rail opened in February 2019, while the Canberra light rail opened on 20 April 2019. This is the first time that there have been trams in Canberra, even though Walter Burley Griffin's 1914–1920 plans for the capital then in the planning stage did propose a Canberra tram system.

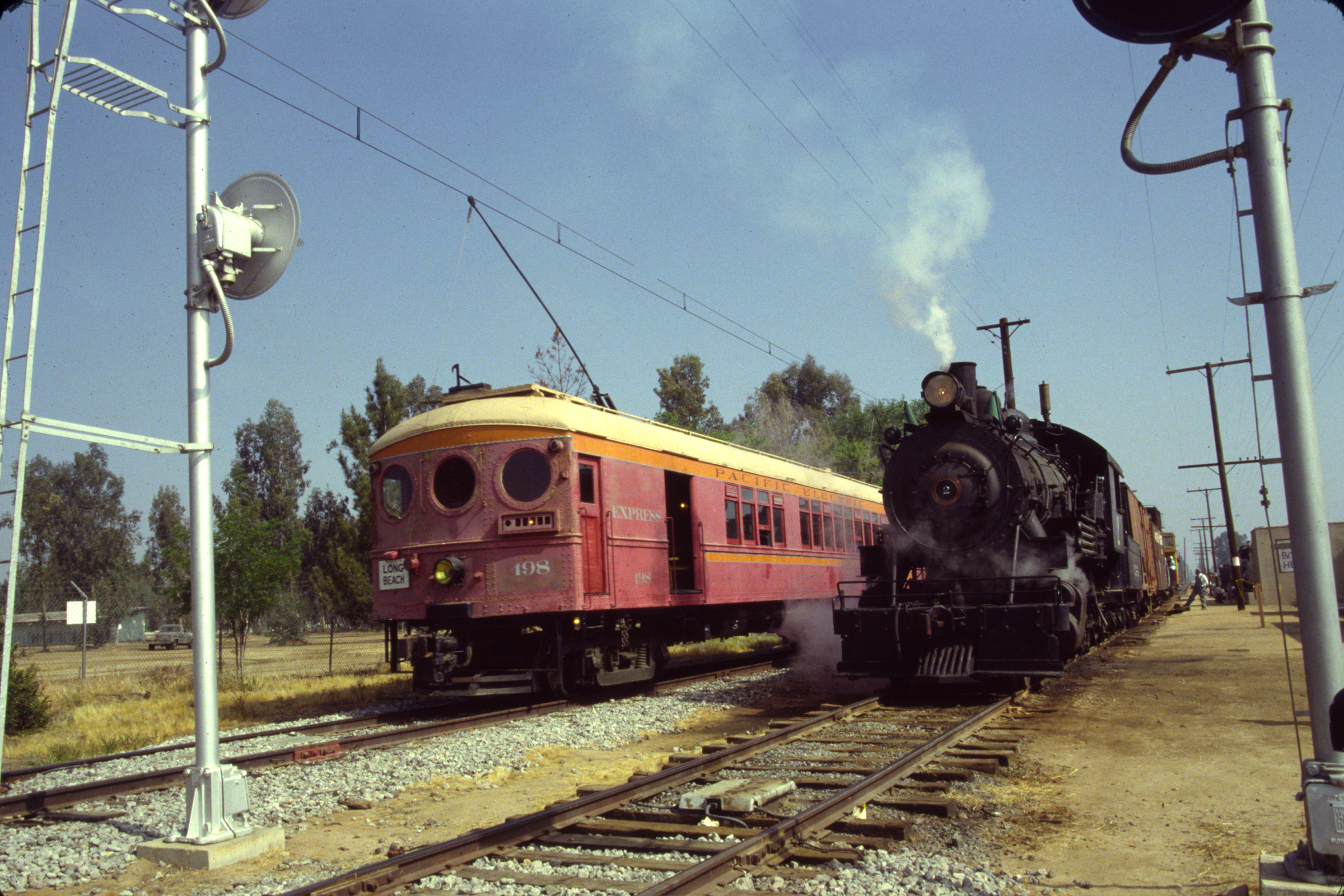
The Southern California Railway Museum in Perris has the largest collection of Pacific Electric Railway streetcars (known as the Red Cars).

In Japan, the Kyoto Electric railroad was the first tram system, starting operation in 1895. By 1932, the network had grown to 82 railway companies in 65 cities, with a total network length of 1,479 km (919 mi). By the 1960s the tram had generally died out in Japan.

Two rare but significant alternatives were conduit current collection, which was widely used in London, Washington, D.C., and New York City, and the surface contact collection method, used in Wolverhampton (the Lorain system), Torquay and Hastings in the UK (the Dolter stud system), and in Bordeaux, France (the ground-level power supply system).

The convenience and economy of electricity resulted in its rapid adoption once the technical problems of production and transmission of electricity were solved. Electric trams largely replaced animal power and other forms of motive power including cable and steam, in the late 19th and early 20th centuries.

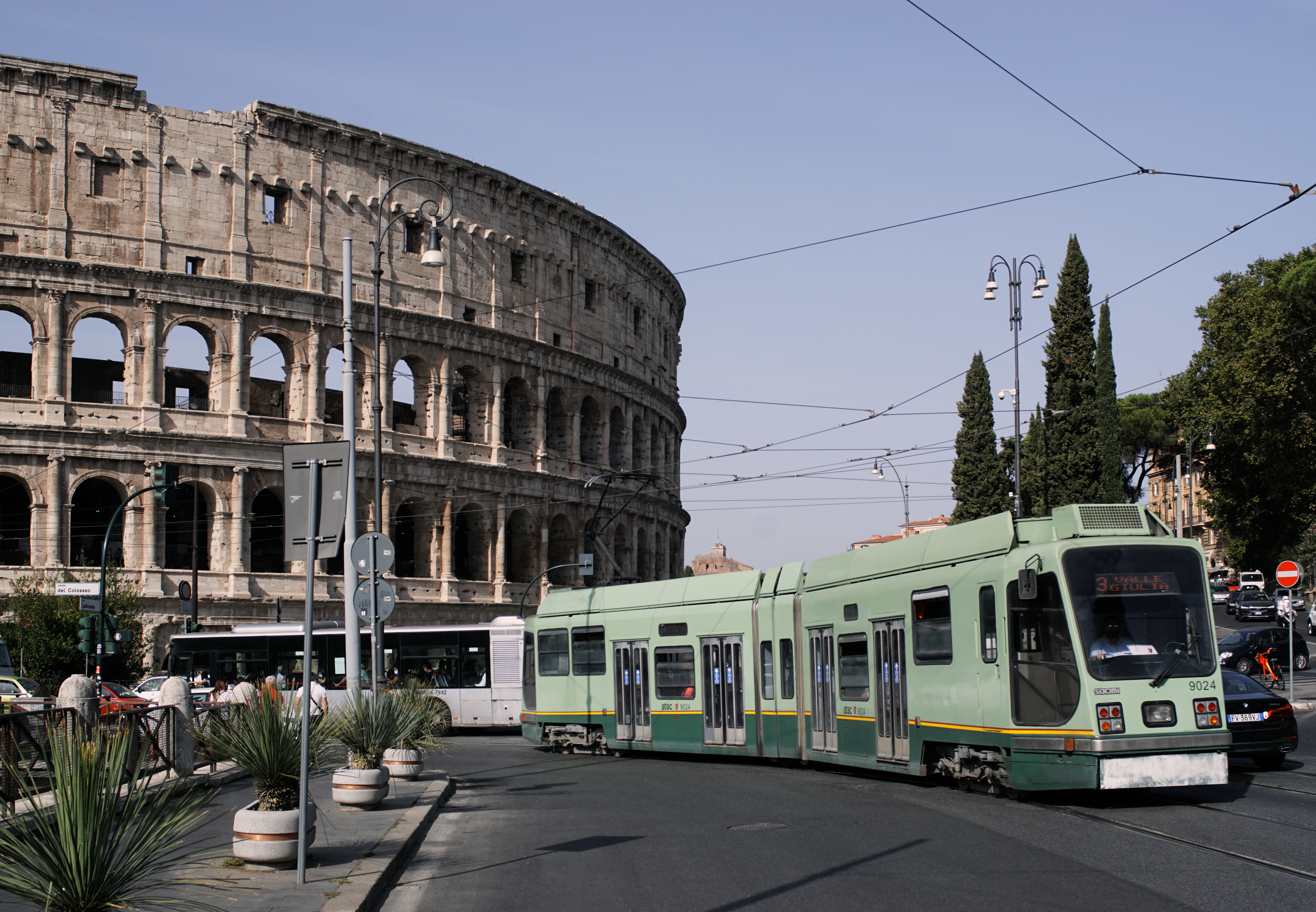
Tram line 3 Socimi in front of Colosseum in Rome.

There was one particular hazard associated with trams powered from a trolley pole off an overhead line on the early electrified systems. Since the tram relies on contact with the rails for the current return path, a problem arises if the tram is derailed or (more usually) if it halts on a section of track that has been heavily sanded by a previous tram, and the tram loses electrical contact with the rails. In this event, the underframe of the tram, by virtue of a circuit path through ancillary loads (such as interior lighting), is live at the full supply voltage, typically 600 volts DC. In British terminology, such a tram was said to be 'grounded'—not to be confused with the US English use of the term, which means the exact opposite. Any person stepping off the tram and completing the earth return circuit with their body could receive a serious electric shock. If "grounded", the driver was required to jump off the tram (avoiding simultaneous contact with the tram and the ground) and pull down the trolley pole, before allowing passengers off the tram. Unless derailed, the tram could usually be recovered by running water down the running rails from a point higher than the tram, the water providing a conducting bridge between the tram and the rails. With improved technology, this ceased to be a problem.

In the 2000s, several companies introduced catenary-free designs: Alstom's Citadis line uses a third rail, Bombardier's PRIMOVE LRV is charged by contactless induction plates embedded in the trackway and CAF URBOS tram uses ultracaps technology

=== Battery ===
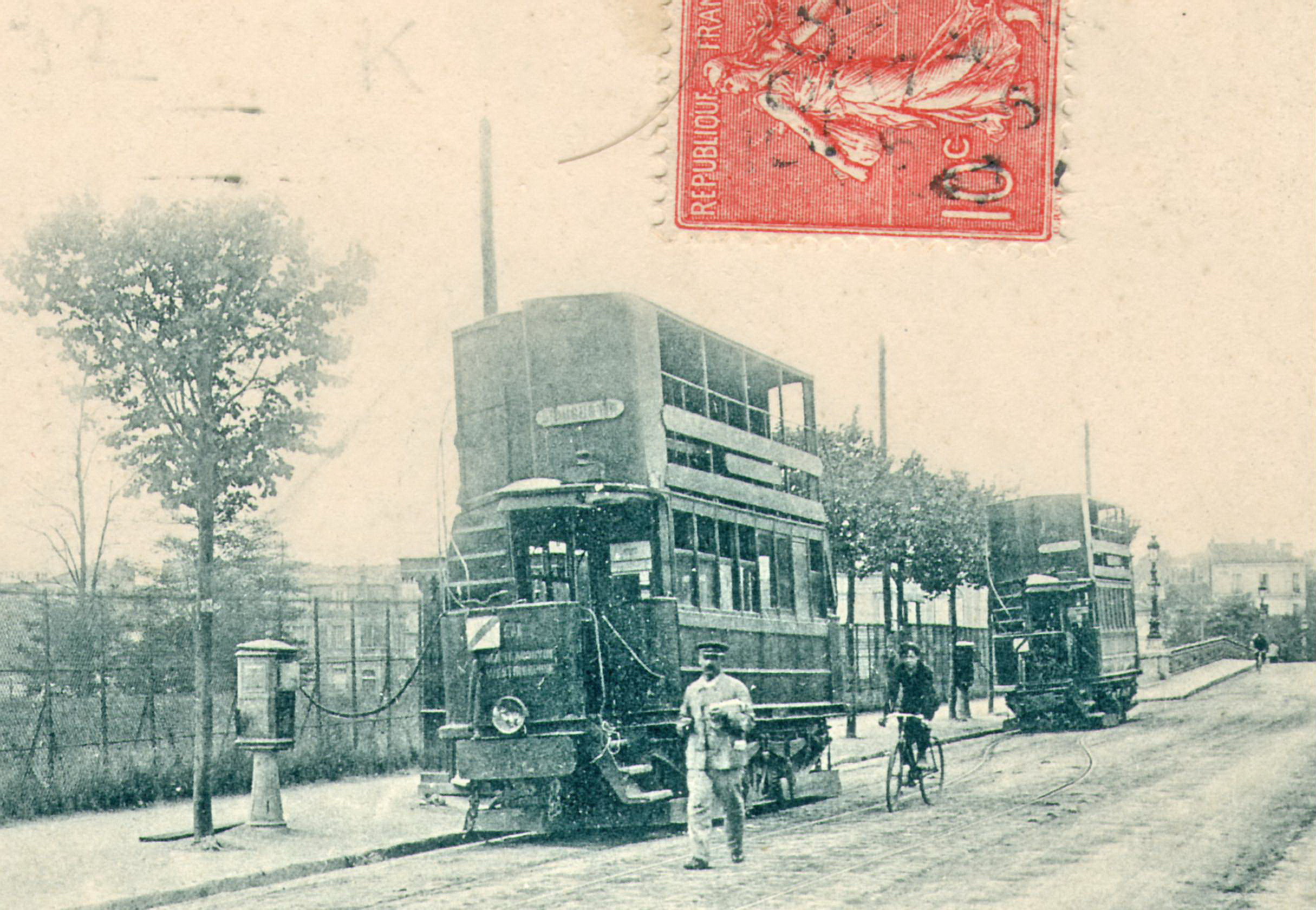
Recharging battery-powered trams of Paris and Seine Tramway Company, late 1890s.

As early as 1834, Thomas Davenport, a Vermont blacksmith, had invented a battery-powered electric motor which he later patented. The following year he used it to operate a small model electric car on a short section of track four feet in diameter.

Attempts to use batteries as a source of electricity were made from the 1880s and 1890s, with unsuccessful trials conducted in among other places Bendigo and Adelaide in Australia. Starting in 1890 the accutram of HTM in The Hague in the Netherlands was used in regular passenger service for about 14 years. The first trams in Bendigo, Australia, in 1892, were battery-powered, but within as little as three months they were replaced with horse-drawn trams. In New York City some minor lines also used storage batteries. Then, during the 1950s, a longer battery-operated tramway line ran from Milan to Bergamo.

In China there is a Nanjing battery Tram line and has been running since 2014. In 2019, the West Midlands Metro in Birmingham, England adopted battery-powered trams on sections through the city centre close to Grade I listed Birmingham Town Hall. Since 2024, battery trams are running in Istanbul on the tourist tramway. In the region of Coventry, a battery powered tram is being tested since 2025.

=== Compressed air ===
Paris and Berne (Switzerland) operated trams that were powered by compressed air using the Mekarski system. Trials on street tramways in Britain, including by the North Metropolitan Tramway Company between Kings Cross and Holloway, London (1883), achieved acceptable results but were found not to be economic because of the combined coal consumption of the stationary compressor and the onboard steam boiler.

=== Hybrid system ===
The Trieste–Opicina tramway in Trieste operates a hybrid funicular tramway system. Conventional electric trams are operated in street running and on reserved track for most of their route. However, on one steep segment of track, they are assisted by cable tractors, which push the trams uphill and act as brakes for the downhill run. For safety, the cable tractors are always deployed on the downhill side of the tram vehicle.

Similar systems were used elsewhere in the past, notably on the Queen Anne Counterbalance in Seattle and the Darling Street wharf line in Sydney.

=== Modern development ===
71-639 «Kastor» at one of the tram stops in Yekaterinburg

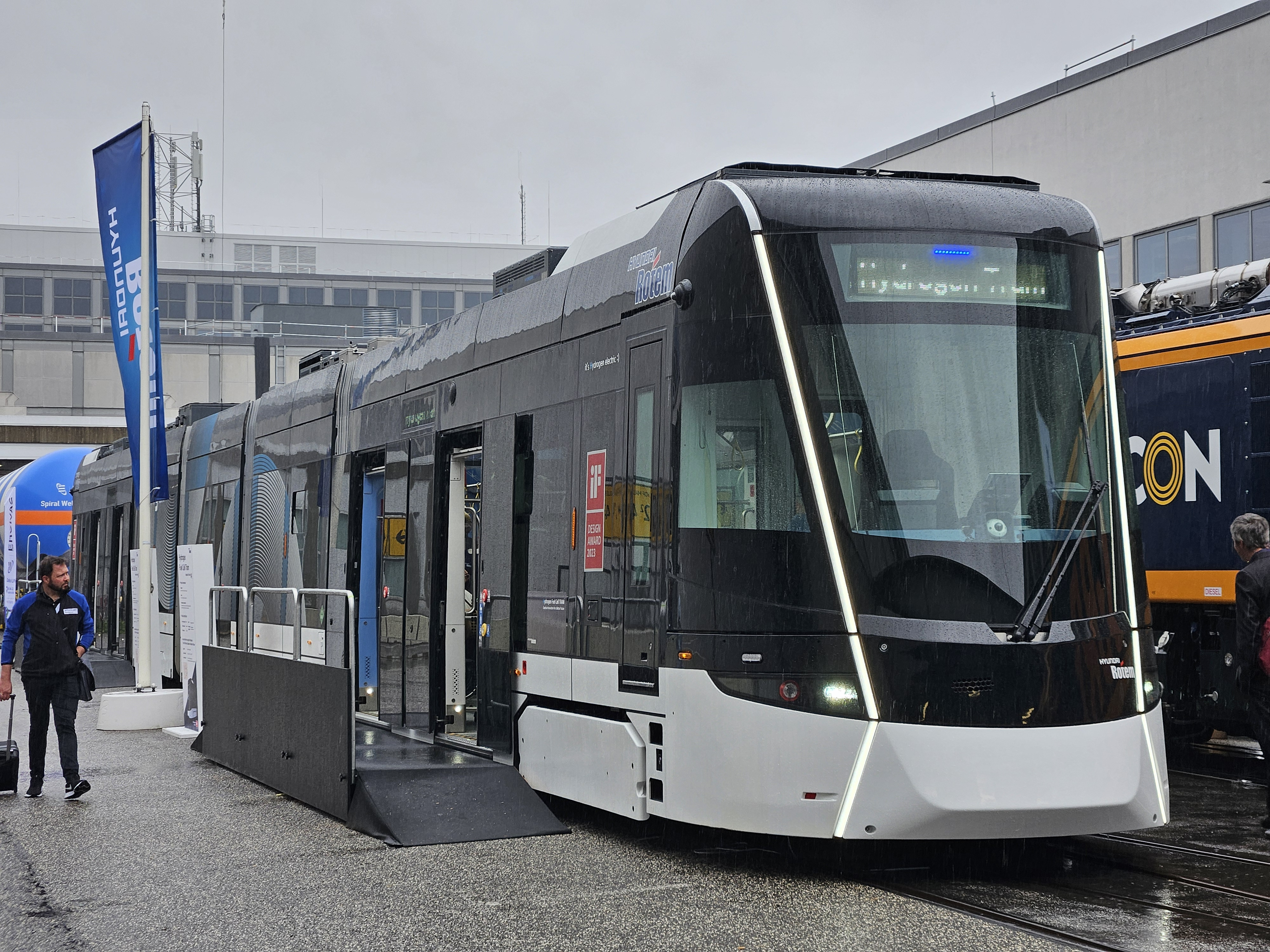
Hyundai Rotem's Hydrogen fuel cell tram train for Daejeon Metro Line 2

In the mid-20th century many tram systems were disbanded, replaced by buses, trolleybuses, automobiles or rapid transit. The General Motors streetcar conspiracy was a case study of the decline of trams in the United States. In the 21st century, trams have been re-introduced in cities where they had been closed down for decades (such as Tramlink in London), or kept in heritage use (such as Spårväg City in Stockholm). Most trams made since the 1990s (such as the Bombardier Flexity series and Alstom Citadis) are articulated low-floor trams with features such as regenerative braking.

In March 2015, China South Rail Corporation (CSR) demonstrated the world's first hydrogen fuel cell vehicle tramcar at an assembly facility in Qingdao. The chief engineer of the CSR subsidiary CSR Sifang Co Ltd., Liang Jianying, said that the company is studying how to reduce the running costs of the tram.

In July 2024, 38 hydrogen fuel cell trams manufactured by Hyundai Rotem were selected to operate on Daejeon Metro Line 2. The supply contract has already been signed, and delivery is scheduled to begin in the second half of 2026. The line is expected to enter service in 2028. It means hydrogen trams will run on a 38.8 km route.

== Design ==
Trams have been used for two main purposes: for carrying passengers and for carrying cargo. There are several types of passenger tram:

- Articulated
- Cargo trams
- Double-Decker
- Drop-centre (or drop-center)
- Double ended and Single ended
- Low-floor
- Rubber-tired
- Tram-train

== Operation ==
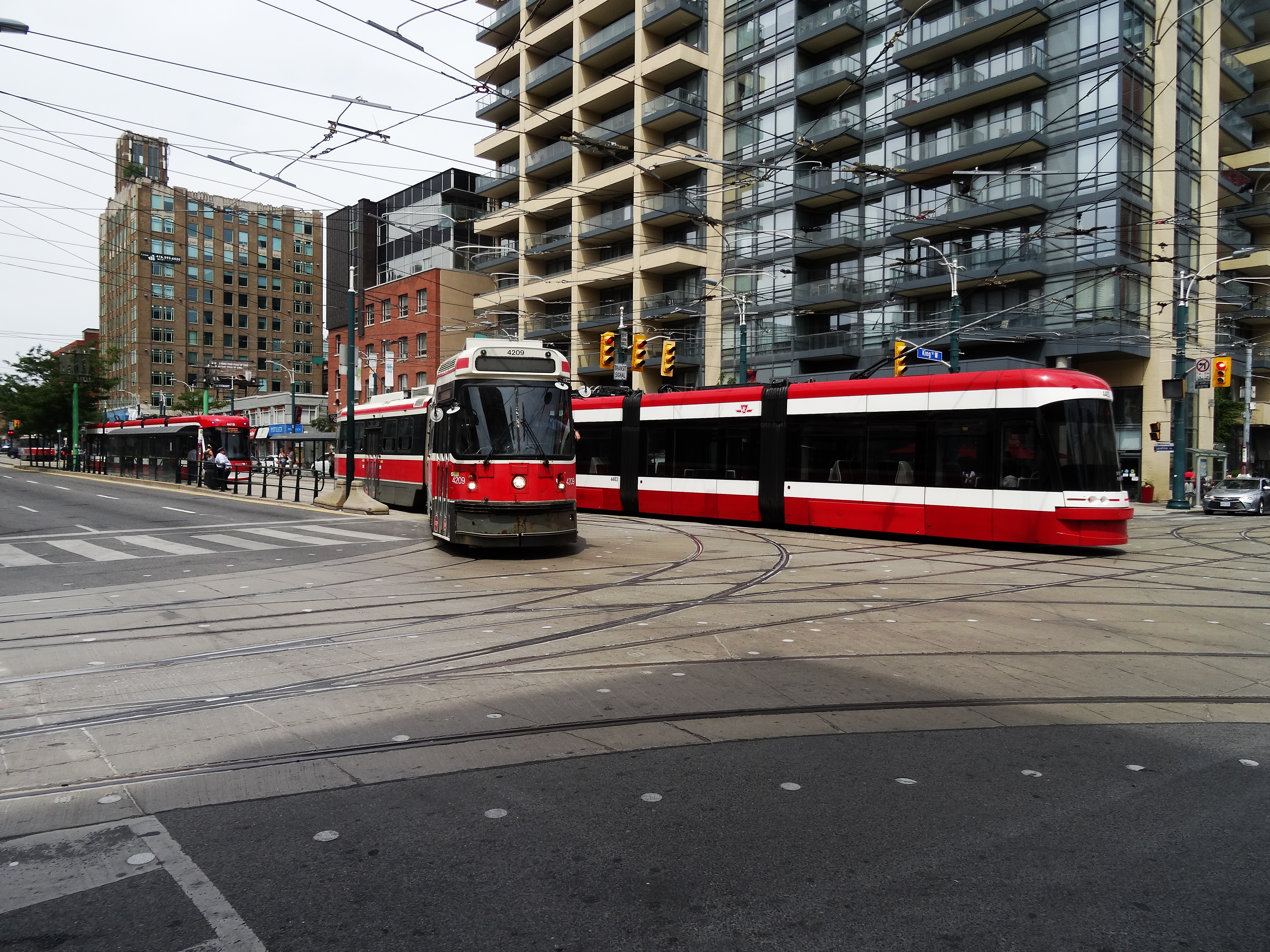
A dedicated right of way lane in Toronto. The tram on the left is about to enter a track operating in mixed traffic.

There are two main types of tramways, the classic tramway built in the early 20th century with the tram system operating in mixed traffic, and the later type which is most often associated with the tram system having its own right of way. Tram systems that have their own right of way are often called light rail but this does depend on the region. Though these two systems differ in their operation, their equipment is similar.

=== Headway ===
A typical headway for a tram or light rail line is 5 minutes during peak hours to 15 minutes off-peak. The optimal headway for bus, tram and metro is 3 to 6 minutes. The lowest recorded interval is 1.5 minutes for the Hong Kong tramway. In the case where coupled articulated tram vehicles have a headway of 2 minutes, the capacity is about 10,000 passengers per hour per direction.

=== Controls ===
Trams were traditionally operated with separate levers for applying power and brakes. More modern vehicles use a locomotive-style controller which incorporate a dead man's switch. The success of the PCC streetcar had also seen trams use automobile-style foot controls allowing hands-free operation, particularly when the driver was responsible for fare collection.

=== Power supply ===
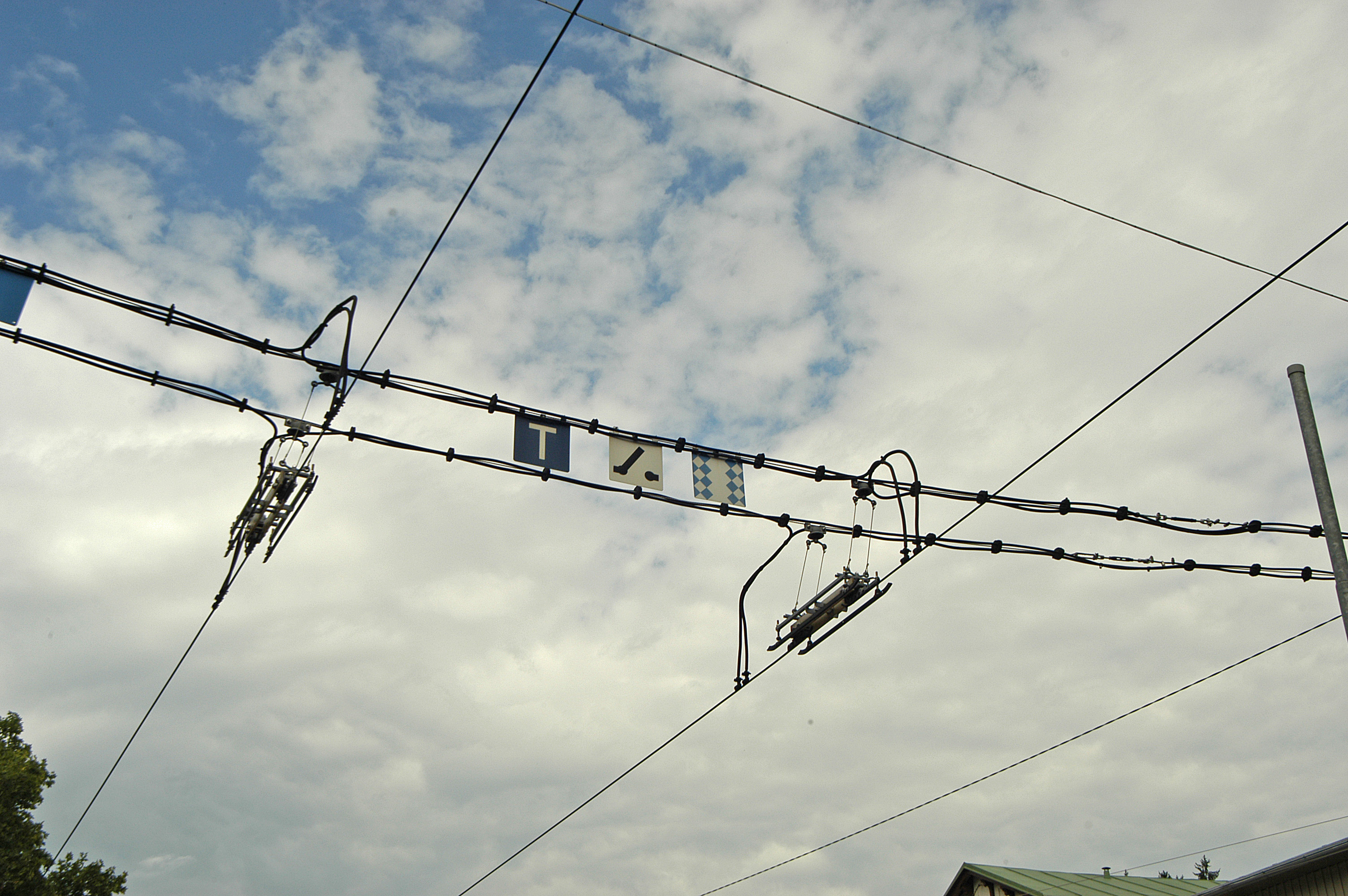
Overhead lines are used for most tram and light rail systems.

Electric trams use various devices to collect power from overhead lines. The most common device is the pantograph, while some older systems use trolley poles or bow collectors. Ground-level power supply has become a more recent innovation. Another technology uses supercapacitors; when an insulator at a track switch cuts off power from the tram for a short distance along the line, the tram can use energy stored in a large capacitor to drive the tram past the gap in the power feed. The old tram systems in London, Manhattan (New York City), and Washington, D.C., used live rails, like those on third-rail electrified railways, but in a conduit underneath the road, from which they drew power through a plough. It was called conduit current collection. Washington's was the last of these to close, in 1962. No commercial tramway uses this system anymore. More recently, an equivalent to these systems has been developed which allows for the safe installation of a third rail on city streets, known as surface current collection or ground-level power supply; the main example of this is the new tramway in Bordeaux.

==== Ground-level power supply ====
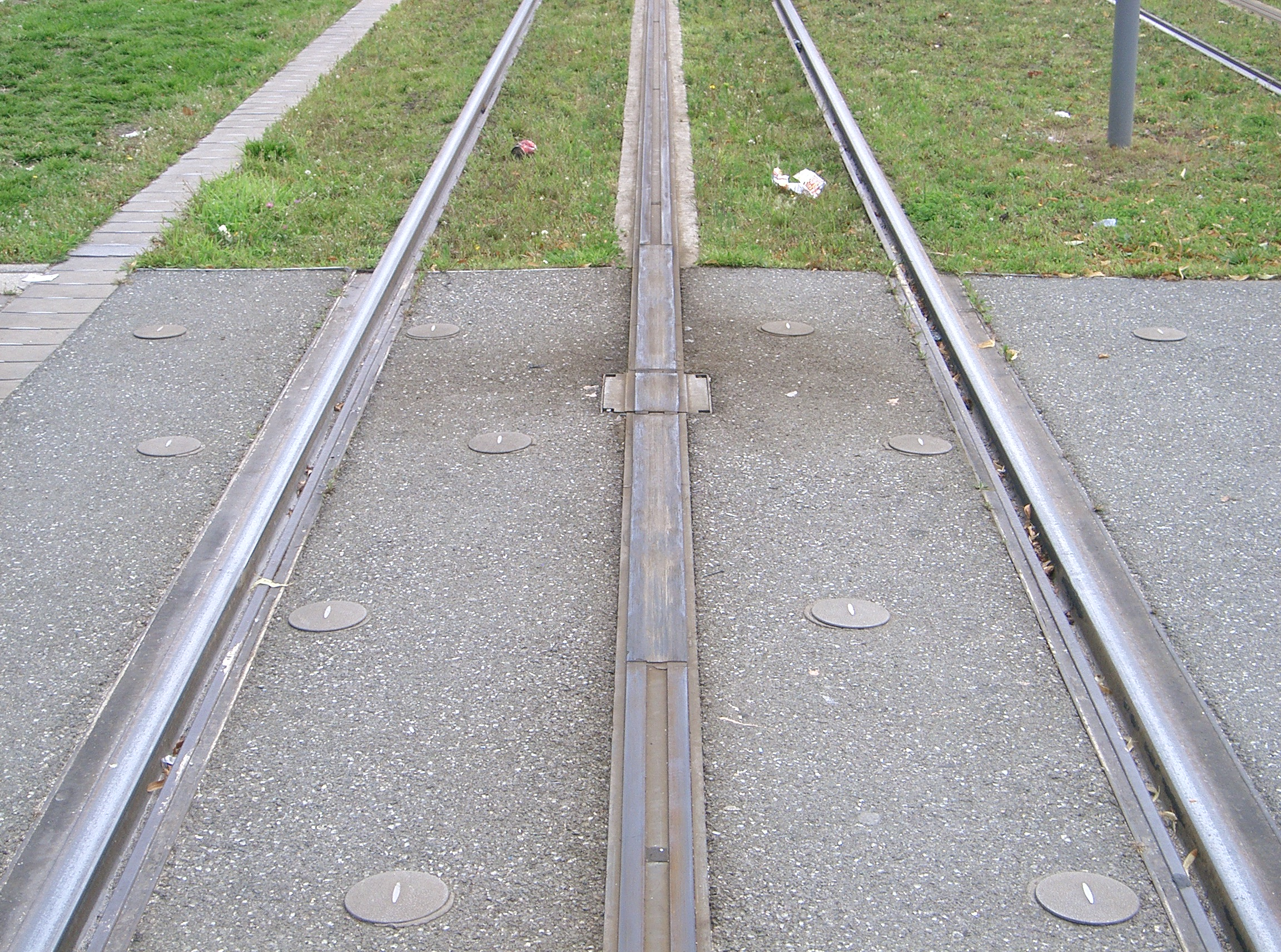
A section of APS track in Bordeaux with powered and neutral sections.

A ground-level power supply system, also called surface current collection or alimentation par le sol (APS), is an updated version of the original stud type system. APS uses a third rail placed between the running rails, divided electrically into eight-metre powered segments with three-metre neutral sections between. Each tram has two power collection skates, next to which are antennas that send radio signals to energize the power rail segments as the tram passes over them.

Older systems required mechanical switching systems which were susceptible to environmental problems. At any one time no more than two consecutive segments under the tram should be live. Wireless and solid state switching eliminate mechanical problems.

Alstom developed the system primarily to avoid intrusive power supply cables in the sensitive area of the old city of old Bordeaux.

=== Routes ===
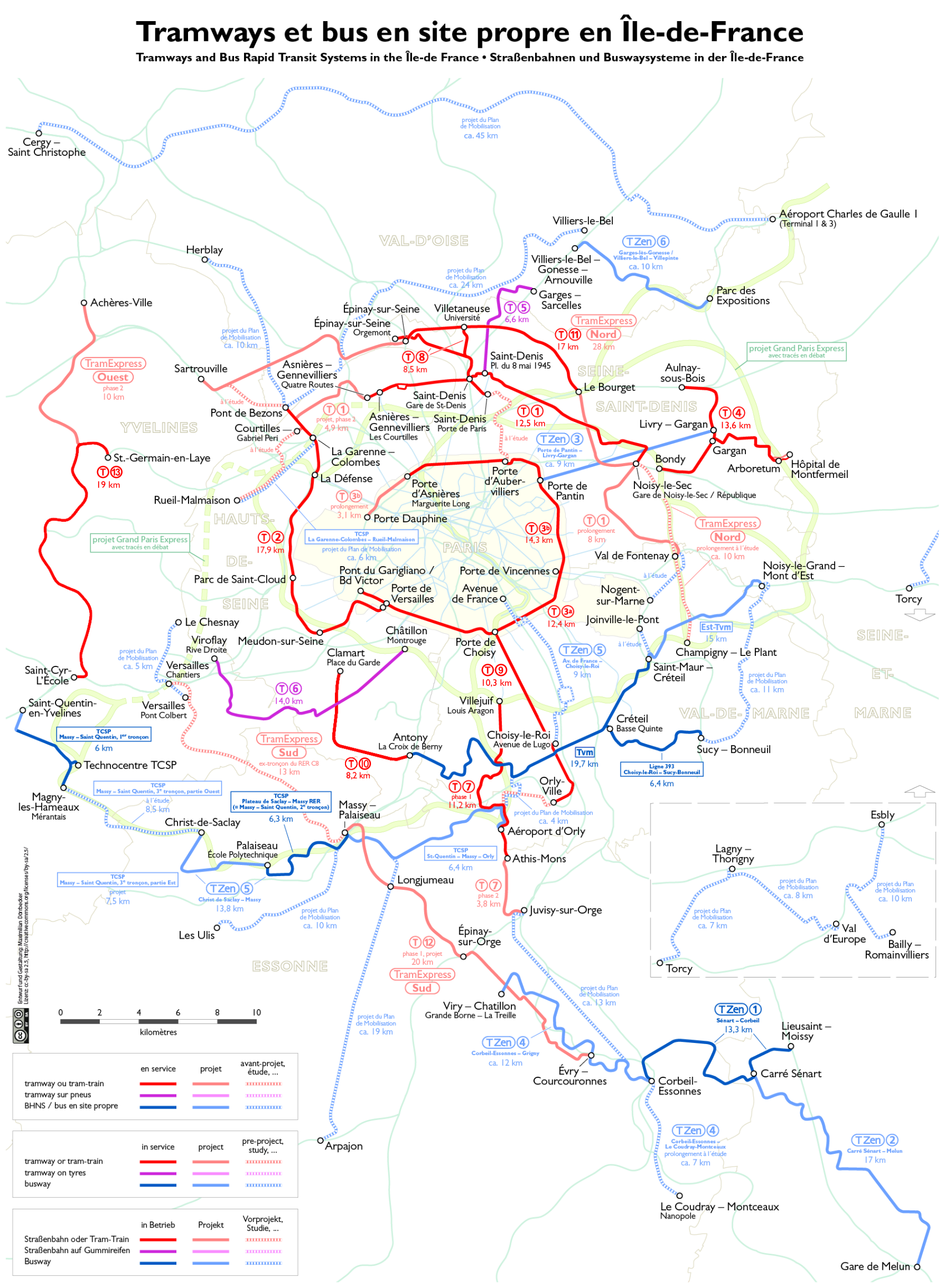
A map of the tram routes of Paris.

Route patterns vary greatly among the world's tram systems, leading to different network topologies.

- Most systems start by building up a strongly nucleated radial pattern of routes linking the city centre with residential suburbs and traffic hubs such as railway stations and hospitals, usually following main roads. Some of these, such as those in Hong Kong, Blackpool and Bergen, still essentially comprise a single route. Some suburbs may be served by loop lines connecting two adjacent radial roads. Some modern systems have started by reusing existing radial railway tracks, as in Nottingham and Birmingham, sometimes joining them together by a section of street track through the city centre, as in Manchester. Later developments often include tangential routes linking adjacent suburbs directly, or multiple routes through the town centre to avoid congestion (as in Manchester's Second City Crossing).
- Other new systems, particularly those in large cities which already have well-developed metro and suburban railway systems, such as London and Paris, have started by building isolated suburban lines feeding into railway or metro stations. In Paris these have then been linked by ring lines.
- A third, weakly nucleated, route pattern may grow up where a number of nearby small settlements are linked, such as in the coal-mining areas served by BOGESTRA or the Silesian Interurbans.
- A fourth starting point may be a loop in the city centre, sometimes called a downtown circulator, as in Portland or El Paso.
- Occasionally a modern tramway system may grow from a preserved heritage line, as in Stockholm.

The resulting route patterns are very different. Some have a rational structure, covering their catchment area as efficiently as possible, with new suburbs being planned with tramlines integral to their layout – such is the case in Amsterdam. Bordeaux and Montpellier have built comprehensive networks, based on radial routes with numerous interconnections, within the last two decades. Some systems serve only parts of their cities, with Berlin being the prime example, as trams survived the city's political division only in the Eastern part. Other systems have ended up with a rather random route map, for instance when some previous operating companies have ceased operation (as with the tramways vicinaux/buurtspoorwegen in Brussels) or where isolated outlying lines have been preserved (as on the eastern fringe of Berlin). In Rome, the remnant of the system comprises three isolated radial routes, not connecting in the ancient city centre, but linked by a ring route. Some apparently anomalous lines continue in operation where a new line would not on rational grounds be built, because it is much more costly to build a new line than to continue operating an existing one.

In some places, the opportunity is taken when roads are being repaved to lay tramlines (though without erecting overhead cables) even though no service is immediately planned: such is the case in Leipzigerstraße in Berlin, the Haarlemmer Houttuinen in Amsterdam, and Botermarkt in Ghent.

==== Cross-border routes ====
Tram systems operate across national borders in Basel (from Switzerland into France and Germany), Geneva (from Switzerland into France) and Strasbourg (from France into Germany).

In 2012, plans were made to connect the Polish town of Słubice to the tram network of Frankfurt an der Oder. These plans were cancelled when voters in Frankfurt voted down funding for the project and replaced the tram line with a bus. Another cross-border tramway that was planned linking Hasselt (Belgium) with Maastricht (Netherlands) was cancelled in June 2022.

== Track ==
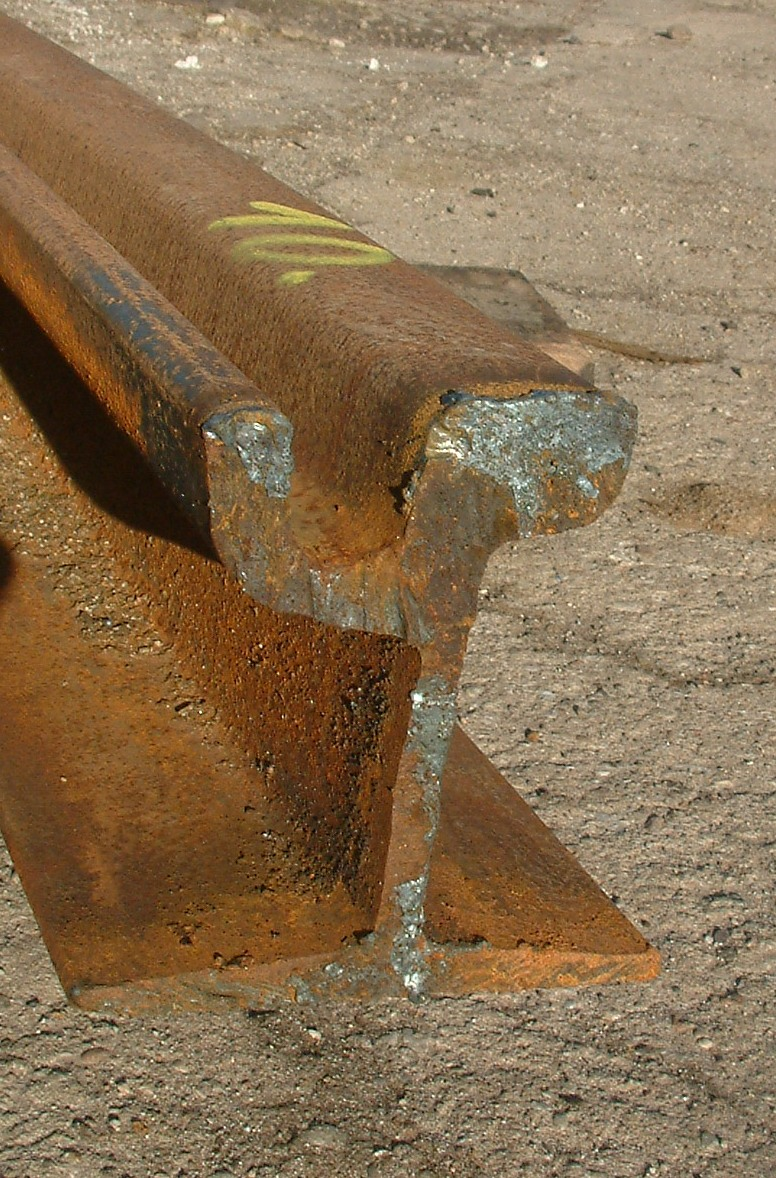
Cross section of a grooved tram rail

Tramway track can have different rail profiles to accommodate the various operating environments of the vehicle. They may be embedded into concrete for street-running operation, or use standard ballasted track with railroad ties on high-speed sections. A more ecological solution is to embed tracks into grass turf, an approach known as green track.

Tramway tracks use a grooved rail with a groove designed for tramway or railway track in pavement or grassed surfaces, also called grassed track or track in a lawn. The rail has the railhead on one side and the guard on the other. The guard provides accommodation for the flange. The guard carries no weight, but may act as a checkrail. Grooved rail was invented in 1852 by Alphonse Loubat, a French inventor who developed improvements in tram and rail equipment, and helped develop tram lines in New York City and Paris. The invention of grooved rail enabled tramways to be laid without causing a nuisance to other road users, except unsuspecting cyclists, who could get their wheels caught in the groove. The grooves may become filled with gravel and dirt (particularly if infrequently used or after a period of idleness) and need clearing from time to time, this being done by a "scrubber" tram. Failure to clear the grooves can lead to a bumpy ride for the passengers, damage to either wheel or rail and possibly derailing.

In narrow situations double-track tram lines sometimes reduce to single track, or, to avoid switches, have the tracks interlaced.

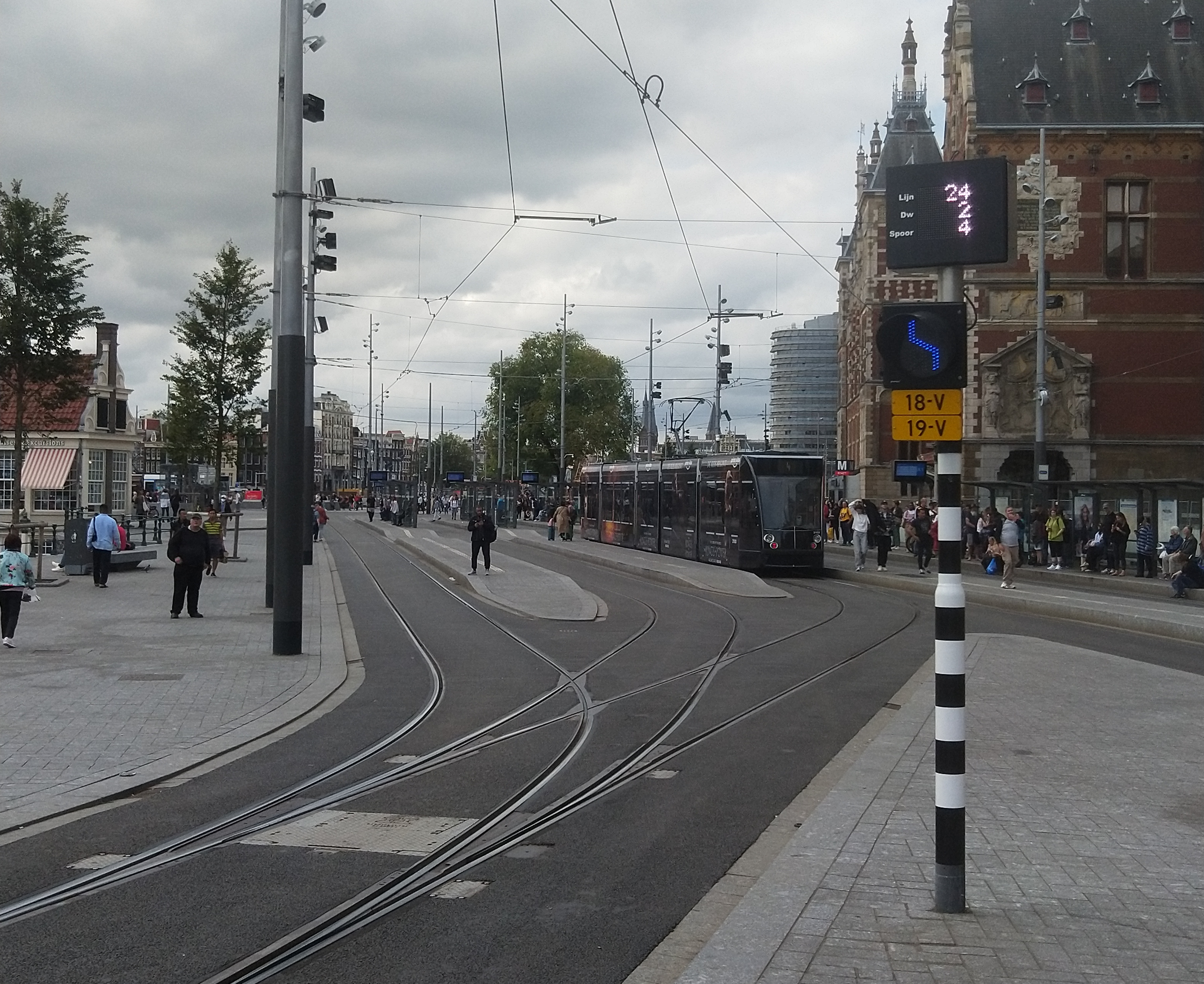
A 3-way point-setting system in Amsterdam. The indicator on the right displays "Lijn 24, Spoor 4". The points are set to automatically send the next tram (route 24 to De Boelelaan/VU) to platform 4 on the left.

=== Switches ===
On many tram systems where tracks diverge, the driver chooses the route, usually either by flicking a switch on the dashboard or by use of the power pedal – generally if power is applied the tram goes straight on, whereas if no power is applied the tram turns. Some systems use automatic point-setting systems, where the route for each journey is downloaded from a central computer, and an onboard computer actuates each point as it comes to it via an induction loop. Such is the case at Manchester Metrolink. If the powered system breaks down, most points may be operated manually, by inserting a metal lever ('point iron') into the point machine.

=== Track gauge ===
Historically, the track gauge has had considerable variations, with narrow gauge common in many early systems. However, most light rail systems are now standard gauge. An important advantage of standard gauge is that standard railway maintenance equipment can be used on it, rather than custom-built machinery. Using standard gauge also allows light rail vehicles to be delivered and relocated conveniently using freight railways and locomotives.

Another factor favoring standard gauge is that low-floor vehicles are becoming popular, and there is generally insufficient space for wheelchairs to move between the wheels in a narrow gauge layout. Standard gauge also enables – at least in theory – a larger choice of manufacturers and thus lower procurement costs for new vehicles. However, other factors such as electrification or loading gauge for which there is more variation may require costly custom-built units regardless.

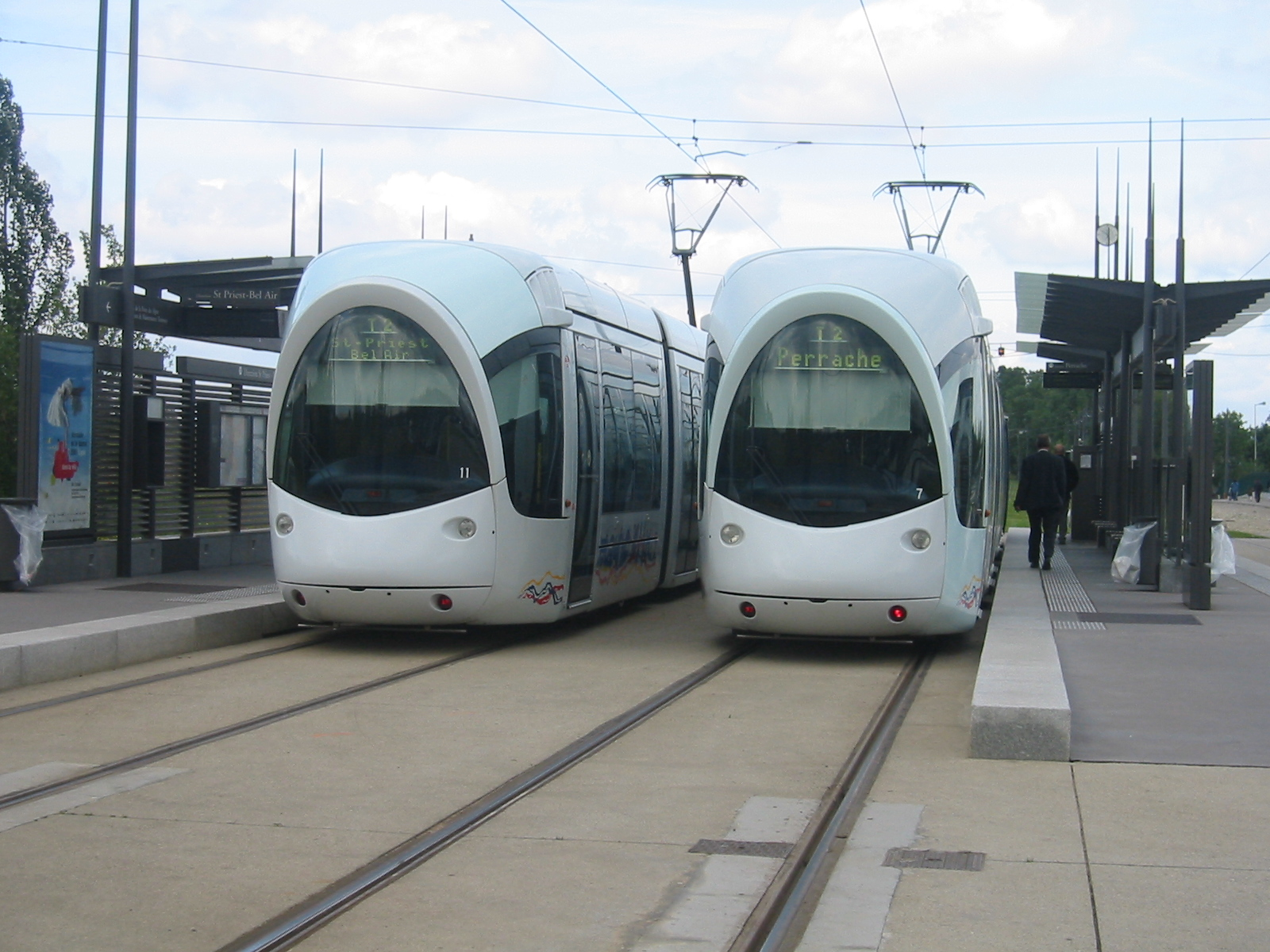
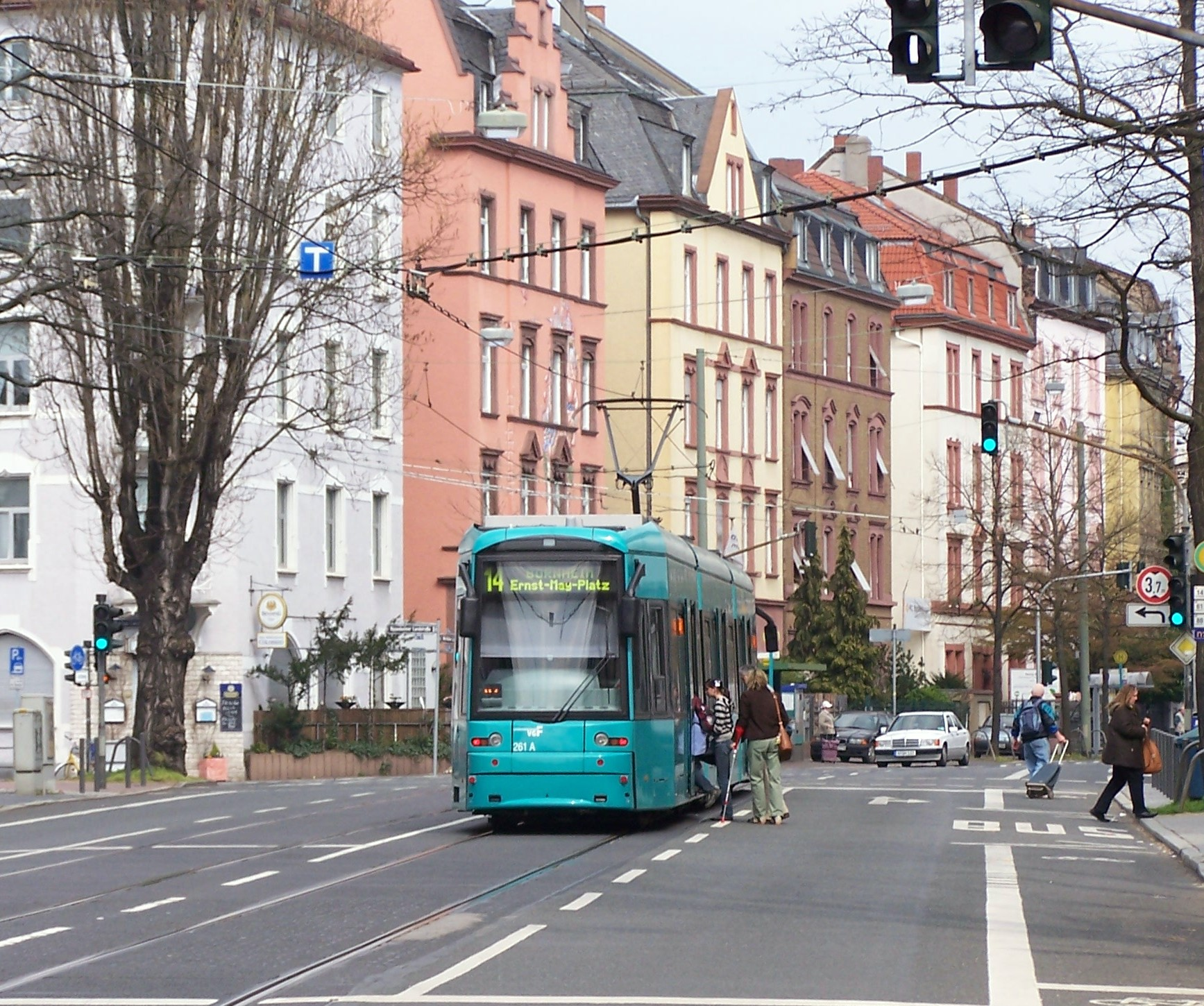
Tram stops can range from purpose-built, tram-exclusive facilities (left), to simple stops within a public road (right).

=== Tram stop ===
Tram stops may be similar to bus stops in design and use, particularly in street-running sections, where in some cases other vehicles are legally required to stop clear of the tram doors. Some stops may have railway platforms, particularly in private right-of-way sections and where trams are boarded at standard railway platform height, as opposed to using steps at the doorway or low-floor trams.

== Manufacturing ==
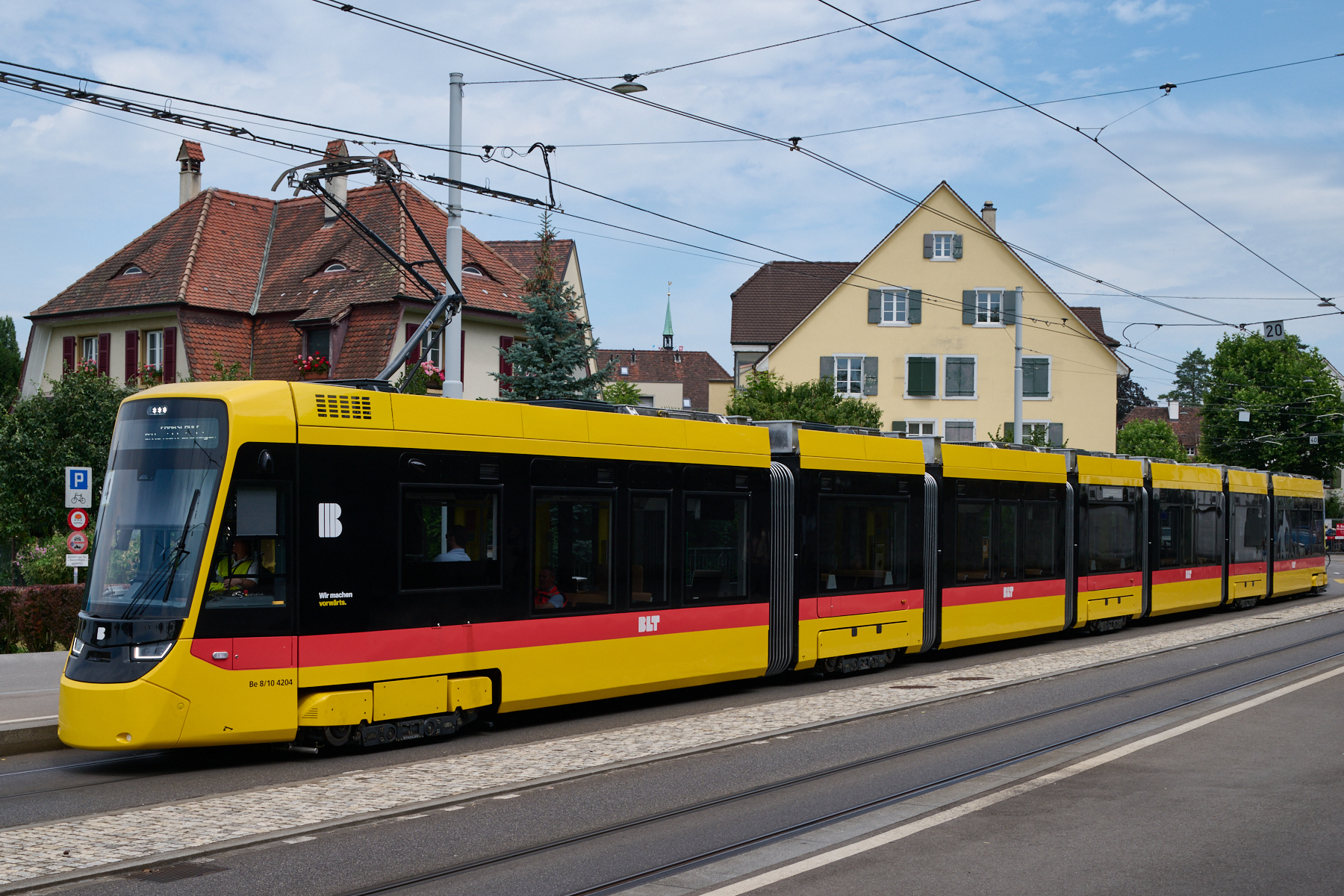
A BLT TINA tram in 2024.

Many independent companies started making trams in the 19th and early 20th century. In the last several decades most of them have merged with or into larger ones. The biggest changes in the period after 2010 were the mergers of AnsaldoBreda into Hitachi Rail in 2015 and Bombardier into Alstom in 2020. Approximately 5,000 new trams are manufactured each year.

As of February 2017, 4,478 new trams were on order from their makers, with a further 1,092 options being open: By February 2026, this had increased by 49% to 6,656 trams on order with 2,596 options.

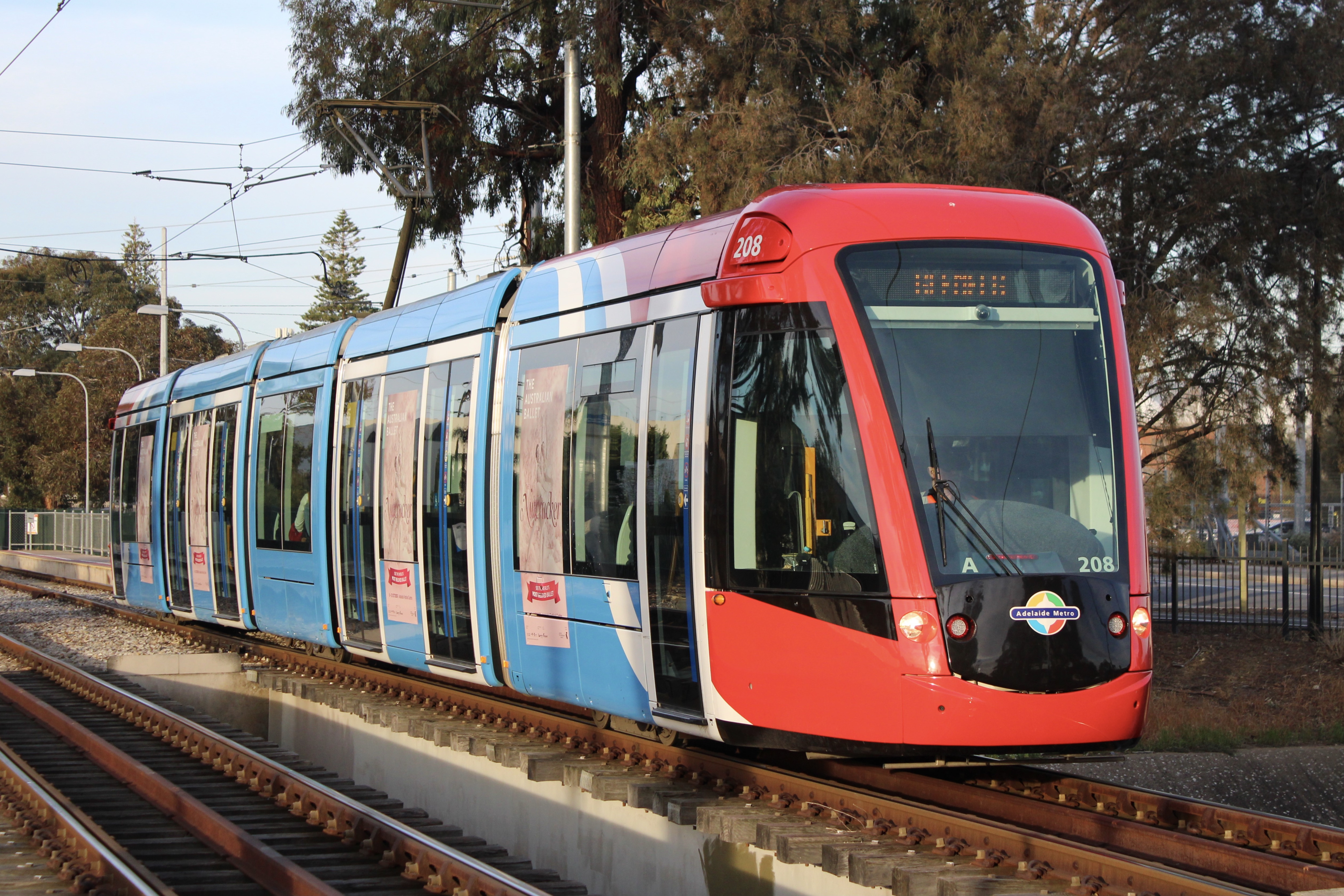
Alstom Citadis 302 tram for Adelaide Metro.

Trams on order as February 2017
Manufacturer	Firm orders	Options
Bombardier	962	296
Alstom	650	202
Siemens	557	205
CAF	411	112
CRRC	370	30
PKTS/Metrovagonmash	316	–
Kinkisharyo	155	97
Stadler-Vossloh	189	25
Stadler	182	28
Škoda Transtech	104	47
Škoda	110	–
Durmazlar	90	–

== Debate ==
For proposed new services, many cities, regions, or agencies will consider trams alongside other travel modes such as Bus Rapid Transit or Metro Systems for a proposed route. In these comparisons, trams have several notable advantages over other modes that have led to the so-called 'second-generation' of tram systems, but also several notable disadvantages

=== Advantages ===
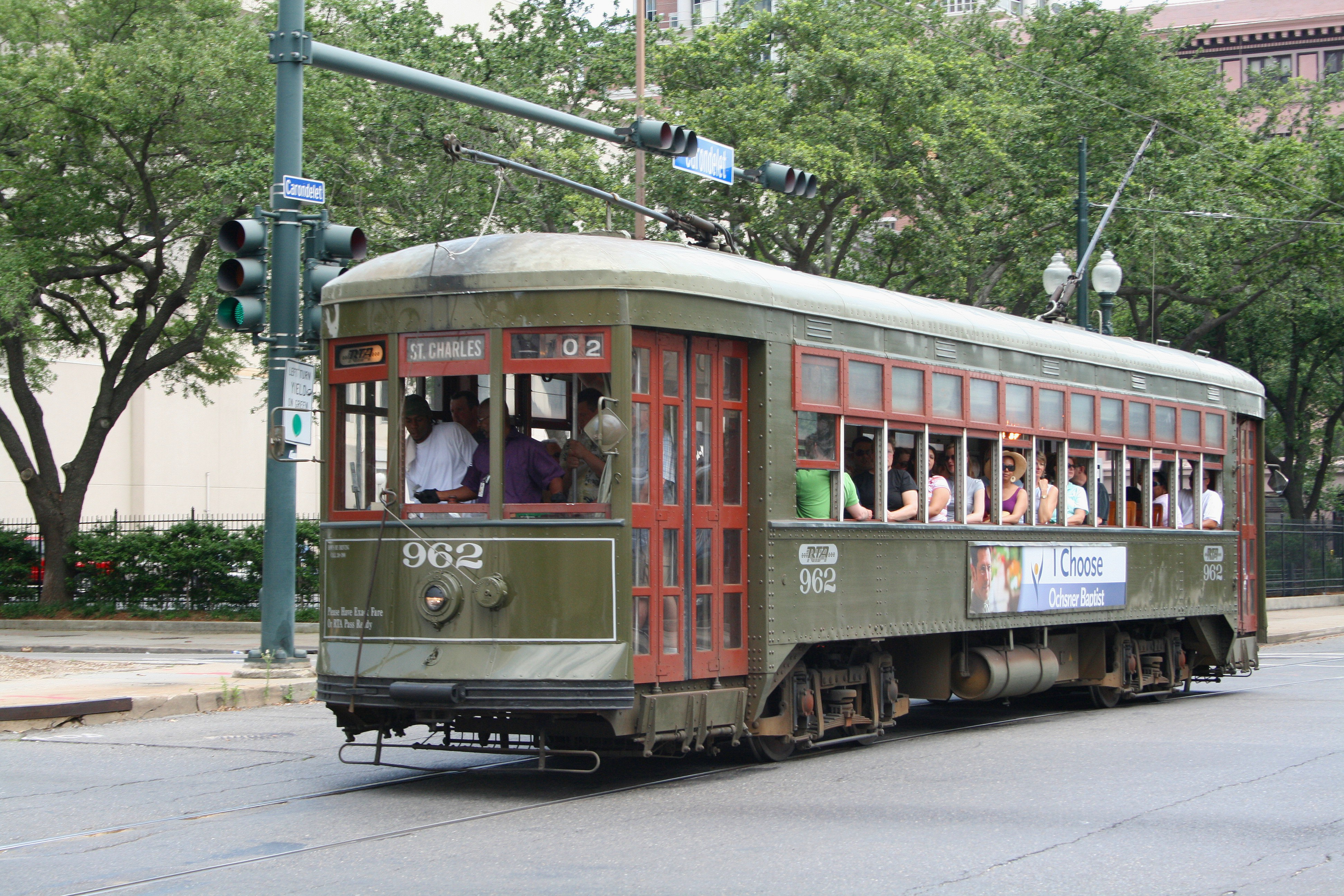
Produced in 1923–24, 900 Series trams are still in use in New Orleans. Trams typically have longer service life than internal combustion buses.

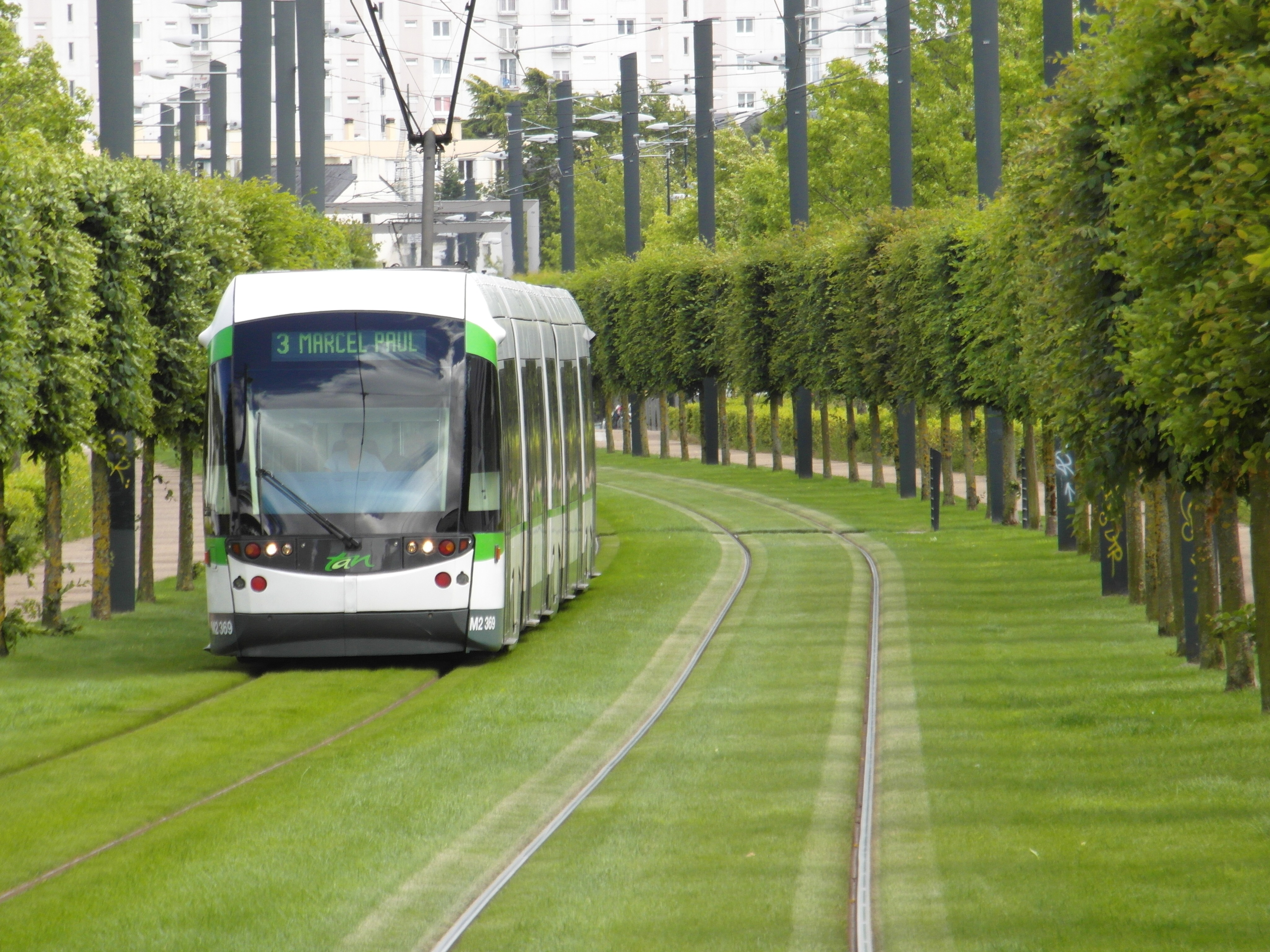
A tram running down tracks embedded in grass in Nantes.

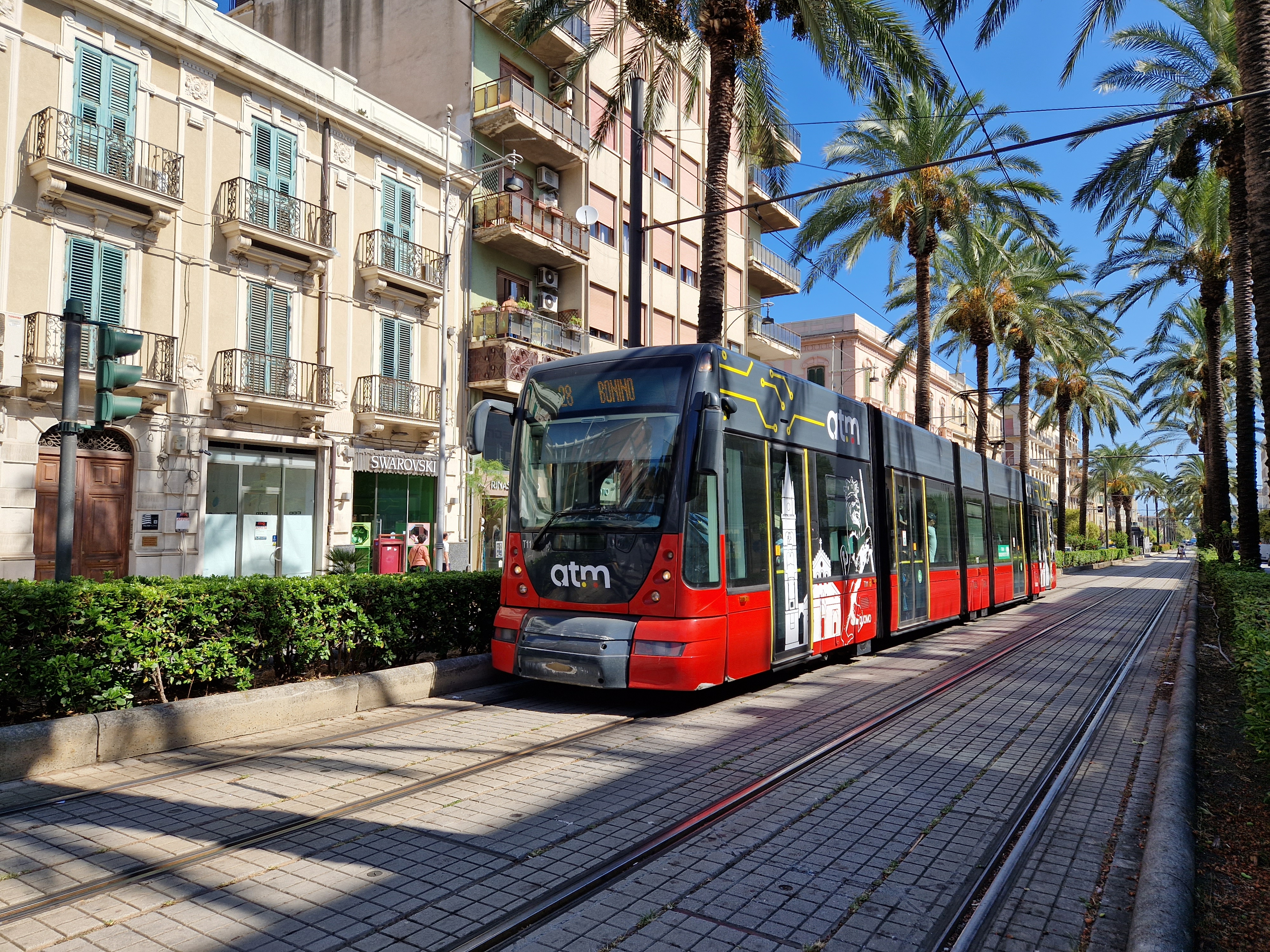
Tramway system in Messina, opened in 2003

- Trams, along with most modes of public transportation, can be much more space efficient compared to private automobiles.
- Vehicles run more efficiently compared to rubber-tired vehicles.
- Compared to technologies such as buses that commonly run on fossil fuels, trams generally use electric propulsion which results in better air quality and a lower carbon footprint, while steel wheels produce less particulate matter than rubber tires.
- While the magnitude of the effect has historically been debated, it is generally accepted that a tram service will attract more passengers than a bus service, even one that otherwise operates with the same level of service. Conversely, the abandonment of tram service has led to measurable declines in ridership.
- Being guided by rails gives trams a shorter turn radius than unguided vehicles.
- Trams and light rail systems are significantly cheaper to install than rapid transit.

=== Disadvantages ===
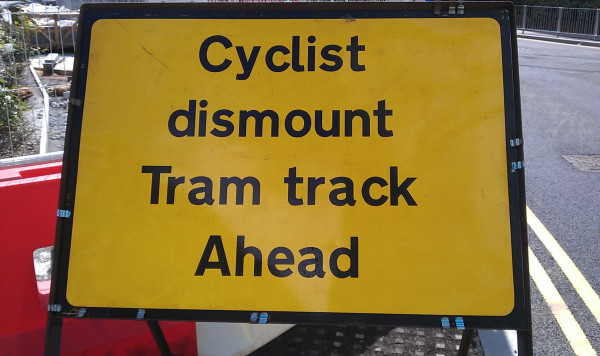
Tram tracks pose a hazard for cyclists, as their wheels may get caught in the track.

- Installing overhead lines generally results in higher up-front infrastructure costs compared to buses, which require few or no modifications to existing streets to begin operations.
- The opening of new tram and light rail systems has sometimes been accompanied by a marked increase in car accidents, as a result of drivers' unfamiliarity with the physics and geometry of trams. Though such increases may be temporary, long-term conflicts between motorists and light rail operations can be alleviated by segregating their respective rights-of-way and installing appropriate signage and warning systems.
- Rail transport can expose neighboring populations to moderate levels of low-frequency noise. However, transportation planners use noise mitigation strategies to minimize these effects. This effect may be counteracted by a decrease in private vehicle traffic along the corridor.
- The overhead power lines and supporting poles utilized by trams (except for those using a third rail) can contribute to visual pollution.

== By region ==
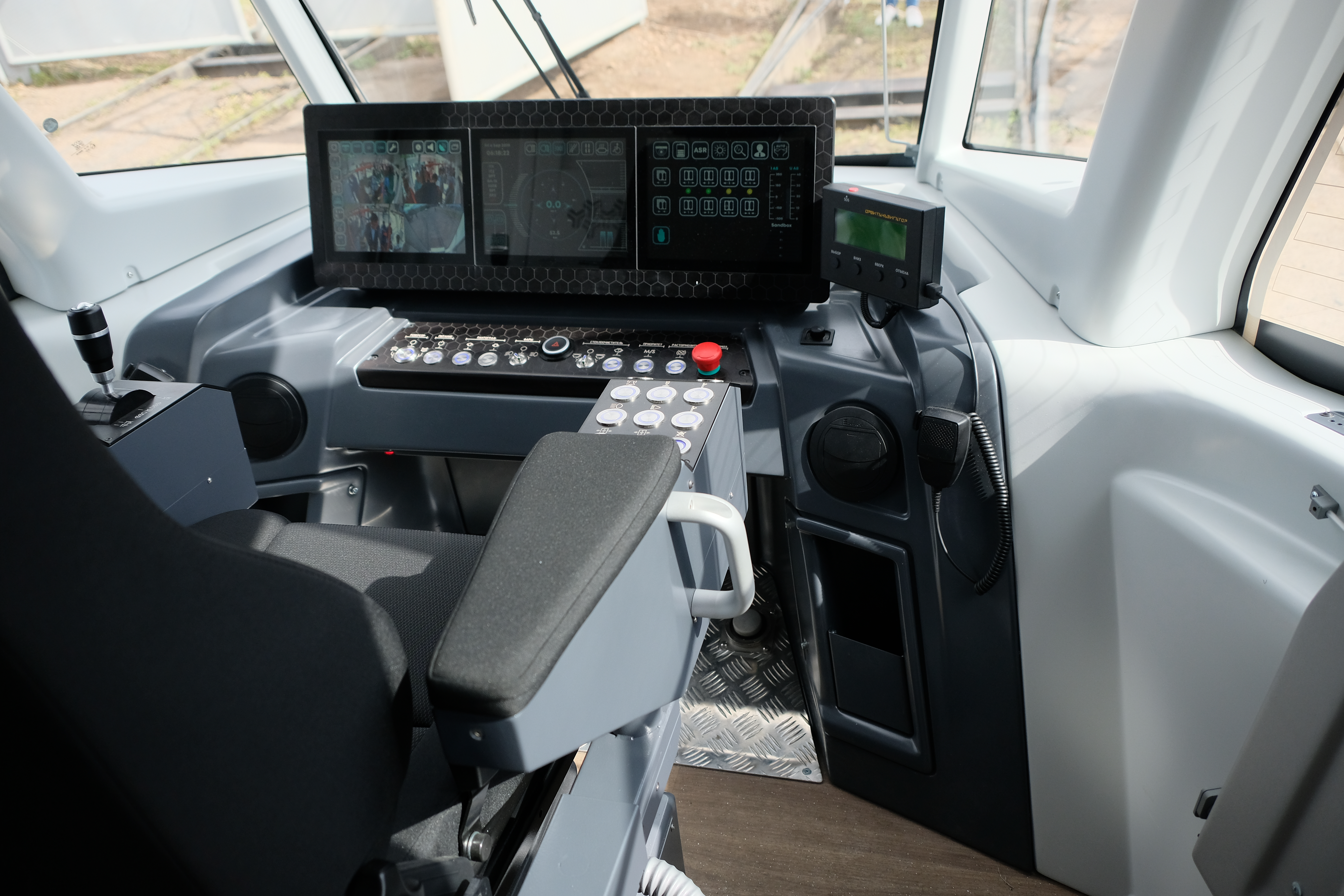
The driver's seat in the Russian "Lvionok" ("Lionet") tram

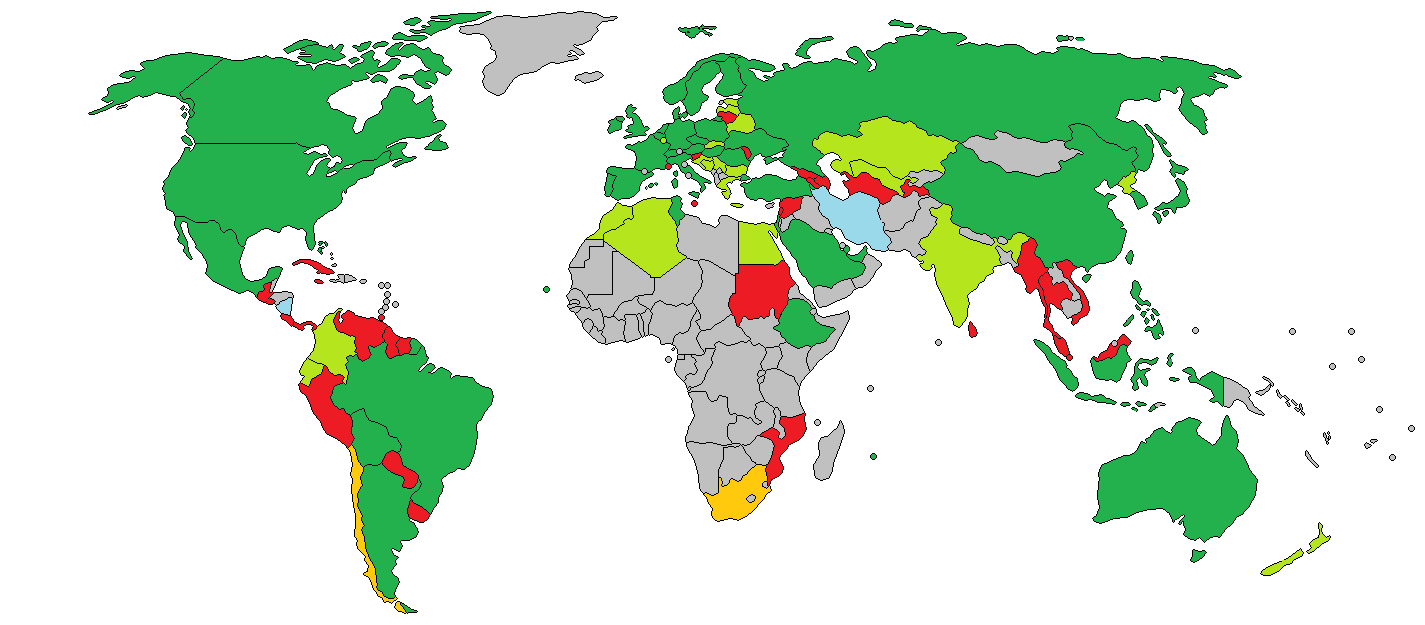
Trams and LRT systems around the world as of 2026 Existing systems and/or LRT Only streetcar Planned Only heritage lines Former Never opened

Trams are in a period of growth, with about 400 tram systems operating around the world, several new systems being opened each year, and many being gradually extended. Some of these systems date from the late 19th or early 20th centuries. In the past 20 years their numbers have been augmented by modern tramway or light rail systems in cities that had abandoned this form of transport. There have also been some new tram systems in cities that never previously had them.

Tramways with trams (British English) or street railways with streetcars (North American English) were common throughout the industrialised world in the late 19th and early 20th centuries but they had disappeared from most British, Canadian, French and US cities by the mid-20th century. After World War II most Australian cities also began to replace their trams with buses, but Melbourne defied the trend, opening new tram lines even in the mid-1950s. By the 1970s Melbourne was the only Australian city with a major tram network.

By contrast, trams in parts of continental Europe continued to be used by many cities, although there were declines in some countries, including the Netherlands.

Since 1980 trams have returned to favour in many places, partly because their tendency to dominate the roadway, formerly seen as a disadvantage, is considered to be a merit since it raises the visibility of public transport (encouraging car users to change their mode of travel), and enables streets to be reconfigured to give more space to pedestrians, making cites more pleasant places to live. New systems have been built in the United States, United Kingdom, Ireland, Italy, France, Australia and many other countries.

=== Major tram and light rail systems ===
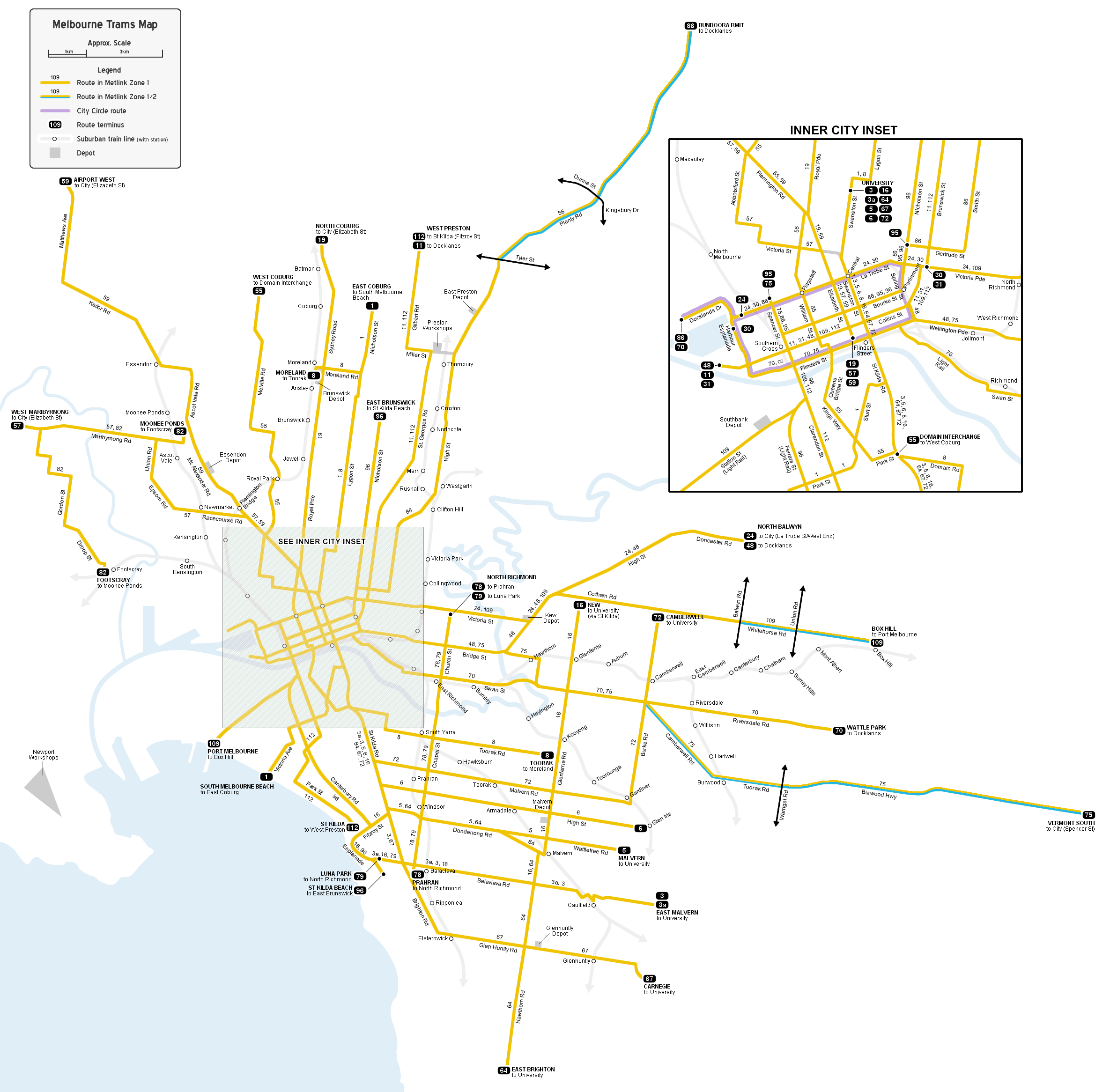
Map of the Melbourne tram system in 2011

The largest tram network by track length and number of stops is in Melbourne.

==== Historical ====
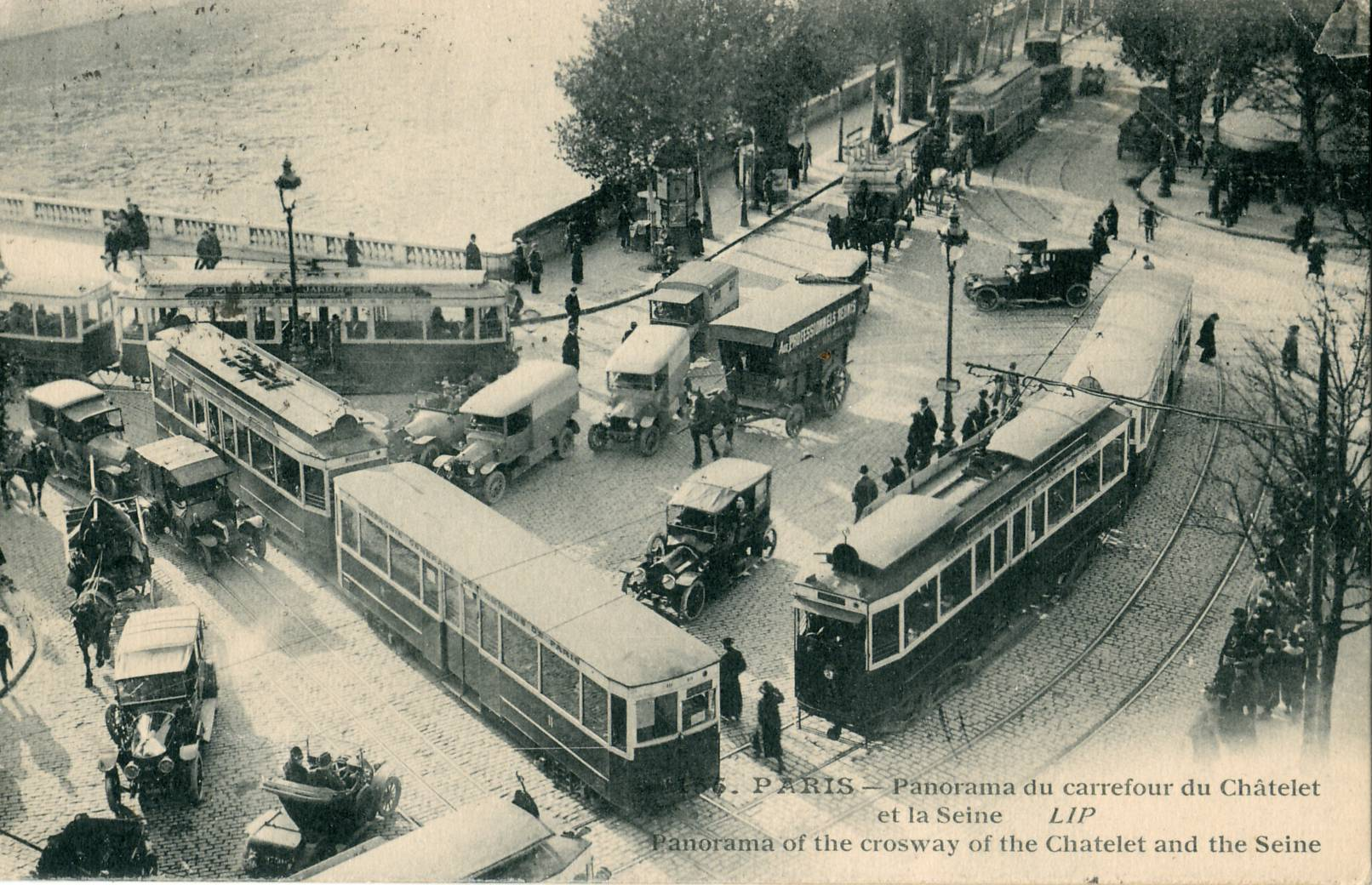
At its peak, the Paris tram system was the world's largest, with over 1,111 kilometres (690 mi) of track in 1925.

Historically, the Paris Tram System was, at its peak, the world's largest system, with 1,111 km (690 mi) of track in 1925 (according to other sources, c. 640 km (400 mi) of route length in 1930). However it was completely closed in 1938. The next largest system appears to have been 857 km (533 mi), in Buenos Aires before 19 February 1963. The third largest was Chicago, with over 850 km (530 mi) of track, but it was all converted to trolleybus and bus services by 21 June 1958. Before its decline, the BVG in Berlin operated a very large network with 634 km (394 mi) of route. Before its system was converted to trolleybus (and later bus) services in the 1930s (last tramway closed 6 July 1952), the first-generation London network had 555 km (345 mi) of route in 1931. In 1958 trams in Rio de Janeiro were employed on (433 km; 269 mi) of track. The final line, the Santa Teresa route was closed in 1968. During a period in the 1980s, the world's largest tram system was in Leningrad (St. Petersburg) with 350 km (220 mi), USSR, and was included as such in the Guinness World Records; however Saint Petersburg's tram system has declined in size since the fall of the Soviet Union. Vienna in 1960 had 340 km (211 mi), before the expansion of bus services and the opening of a subway (1976). Substituting subway services for tram routes continues. 320 km (199 mi) was in Minneapolis–Saint Paul in 1947: There streetcars ended 31 October 1953 in Minneapolis and 19 June 1954 in St. Paul. The Sydney tram network, before it was closed on 25 February 1961, had 291 km (181 mi) of route, and was thus the largest in Australia. Since 1961, the Melbourne system (recognised as the world's largest) has assumed Sydney's title as the largest network in Australia.

== Tram modelling ==
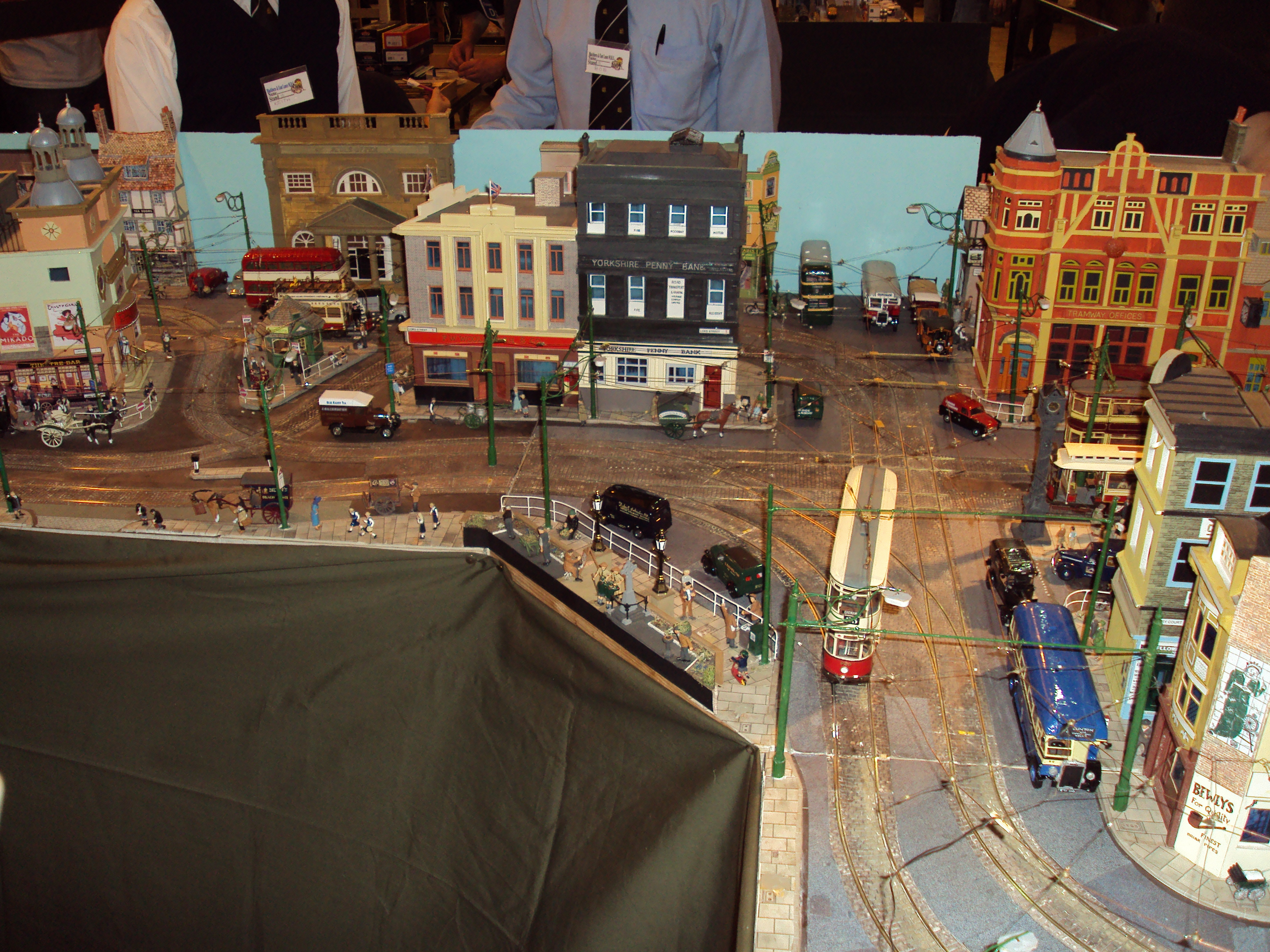
A model of a town with a tram model built into it

Model trams are popular in HO scale (1:87) and O scale (1:48 in the US and generally 1:43.5 and 1:45 in Europe and Asia). They are typically powered and will accept plastic figures inside. Common manufacturers are Roco and Lima, with many custom models being made as well. The German firm Hödl and the Austrian Halling specialise in 1:87 scale.

In the US, Bachmann Industries is a mass supplier of HO streetcars and kits. Bowser Manufacturing has produced white metal models for over 50 years. There are many boutique vendors offering limited run epoxy and wood models. At the high end are highly detailed brass models which are usually imported from Japan or Korea and can cost in excess of $500. Many of these run on 16.5 mm (0.65 in) gauge track, which is correct for the representation of 4 ft 8 1/2 in (1,435 mm) (standard gauge) in HO scale as in US and Japan, but incorrect in 4 mm (1:76.2) scale, as it represents 4 ft 8 1/2 in (1,435 mm). This scale/gauge hybrid is called OO scale. O scale trams are also very popular among tram modellers because the increased size allows for more detail and easier crafting of overhead wiring. In the US these models are usually purchased in epoxy or wood kits and some as brass models. The Saint Petersburg Tram Company produces highly detailed polyurethane non-powered O Scale models from around the world which can easily be powered by trucks from vendors like Q-Car.

== In popular culture ==
- A Streetcar Named Desire was written by Tennessee Williams in 1947.
- The Rev W. Awdry wrote about GER Class C53 called Toby the Tram Engine, which starred in his The Railway Series with his faithful coach, Henrietta.
- "The Trolley Song" in the film Meet Me in St. Louis received an Academy Award nomination.
- Trams feature in the opening titles of the world's longest running TV soap opera Coronation Street, set in a fictional suburb of Greater Manchester, and produced by Granada Television. A Blackpool tram killed one of the main characters in 1989 and the most recent faked accident involved a tram (modelled on the Manchester Metrolink) careering off a viaduct into the set in 2009.
- A model electric trolley prominently featured in the American children's television program Mister Rogers' Neighborhood as a way to transition viewers between different segments of the show.
- The 1986 Australian film Malcolm is centred on an autistic tram enthusiast who builds his own tram and becomes involved with a pair of bank robbers.
- Toonerville Folks comic strip (1908–55) by Fontaine Fox featured the "Toonerville Trolley that met all the trains".
- The Swiss author Robert Walser wrote prose pieces about the electric tram: "In the Electric Tram" (1908), which is included in the 2012 English-language collection Berlin Stories, and "In the Tram" (1921), included in the 2016 English-language collection Girlfriends, Ghosts, and Other Stories.
- Pedestrians in the New York City borough of Brooklyn were nicknamed "trolley dodgers" because they had to avoid being hit by the borough's fast-moving trolleys while crossing their lines. This nickname was used by the borough's Major League Baseball team, the Brooklyn Trolley Dodgers (later the Brooklyn Dodgers, now the Los Angeles Dodgers).
- The Red Car Trolley is a transportation attraction at Disney California Adventure at the Disneyland Resort in Anaheim, California.
- The trolley problem is a thought experiment revolving around choosing whether or not to divert a runaway trolley towards one person to save a larger group on the initial track.
- Since 2012 the World Tramdriver Championship (Tram-WΜ; formerly, the European Tram Driver Championships (Tram EM)) have taken place annually in various cities and has also been streamed live for multiple years.

== See also ==
=== Tram models ===
See Category:Tram vehicles

=== Trams by region ===
- Trams in Africa
- Trams in Asia
- Trams in Australia
- Trams in Europe
- Trams in New Zealand
- Streetcars in North America
- Trams in South America

=== Tram lists ===
- Battery electric multiple unit
- Heritage streetcar
- History of tram and light rail transit systems by country
- List of battery operated trams
- List of largest currently operating tram and light rail transit systems
- List of largest tram and light rail transit systems ever
- List of tram accidents
- List of tram builders
- List of transport museums
- List of town tramway systems
- List of tram and light rail transit systems
- List of tram systems by gauge and electrification
- List of railway electrification systems
- Rapid transit track gauge

=== Other topics ===
- Armoured train#Armoured tram
- Comparison of train and tram tracks
- Convict tramway
- Dual-mode vehicle
- Minecart, also known as a tram
- Rubber-tyred tram
- Streetcar suburb
- Tramway (industrial)
- Traction current pylon
