= Contact rail =

Contact rail may refer to:

- Overhead conductor rail
- Third rail
- Fourth rail

== See also ==
- Conduit current collection
- Current collector
- Ground-level power supply
- Guide bar
- Stud contact system
