= Conductor rail =

Conductor rail may refer to:

- A third rail
- A fourth rail
- A Ground-level power supply

== See also ==
- Conduit current collection
- Linear motor
- Stud contact system
- The guide bars on a rubber tired metro
