= Mallock Memorial Clock Tower =

Clock tower in Devon, England

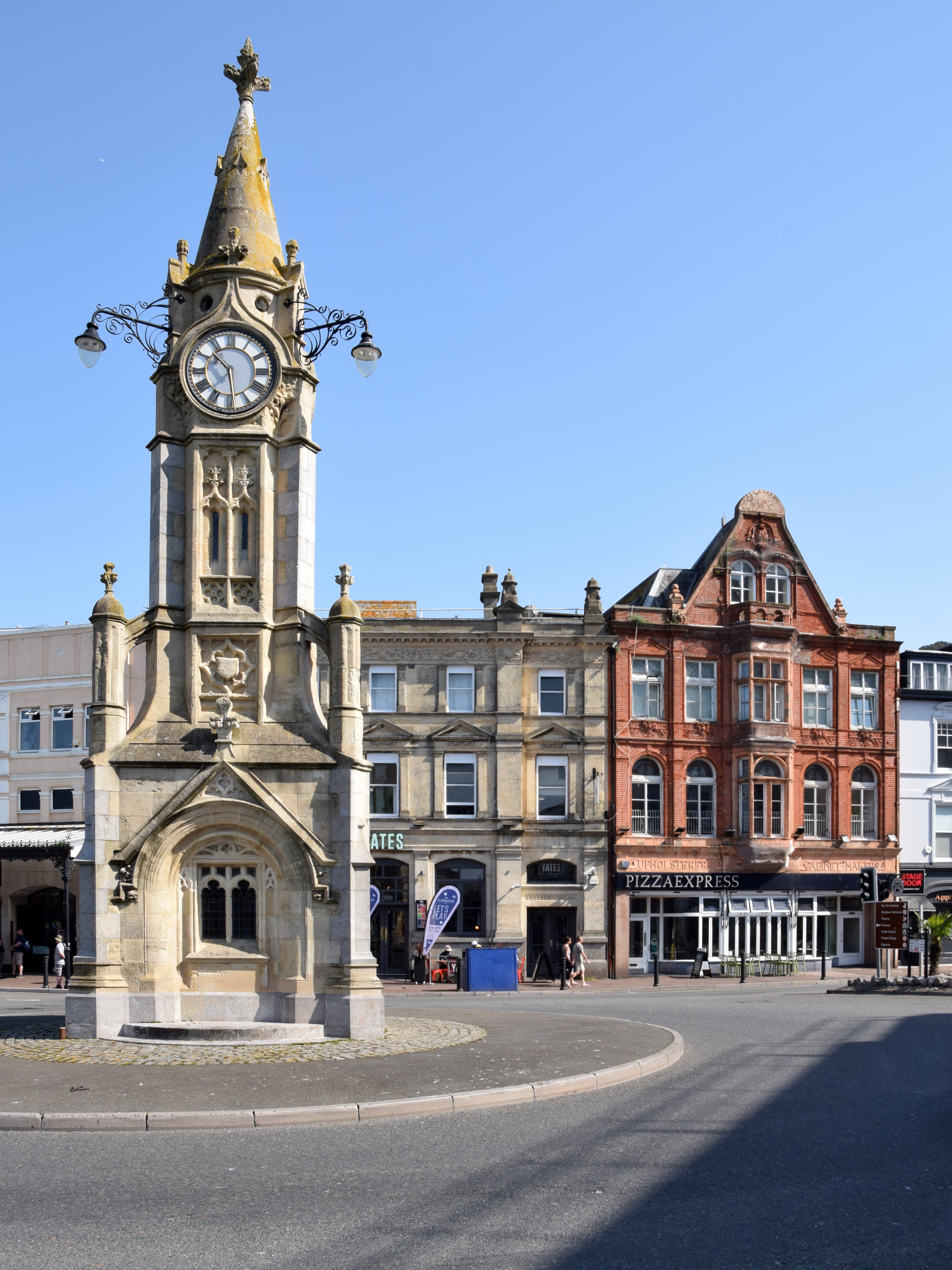
- The clock tower

- Location within Devon
- Alternative names: Mallock Clock Tower, Mallock Memorial, Torquay Clock Tower

General information
- Type: Clock tower
- Architectural style: Gothic
- Location: Clock Tower, The Strand, Torquay, England
- Coordinates: 50.460971°N 3.523686°W
- Named for: Richard Mallock MP
- Completed: 1902

Design and construction
- Architect: John Donkin
- Designations: Grade II Listed Building

The Mallock Memorial Clock Tower is situated at the harbourside in Torquay, Devon, England. It is a Grade II Listed Building, and was first listed in 1975.

== Description ==
The clock tower is at the junctions of The Strand, Torwood Street and Victoria Parade beside Torquay Harbour. The tower is on a new wide paved promenade having formerly been in the middle of a roundabout at this junction.

The tower is constructed of sandstone as well as local limestone, and is of the Gothic style. It has three clock faces, each of which face onto one of the three approaching streets.

== History ==
The clock tower was designed by John Donkin, a local architect of Bournemouth. It was erected by public subscription and completed in 1902, commemorating Richard Mallock, a prominent local figure who owned nearby Cockington and was a Member of Parliament for Torquay. Sculpting work was carried out by Harry Hems & Sons of Exeter, and the contractor was EP Bovey.

The clock has long featured on postcards of Torquay and remains a local landmark to this day.

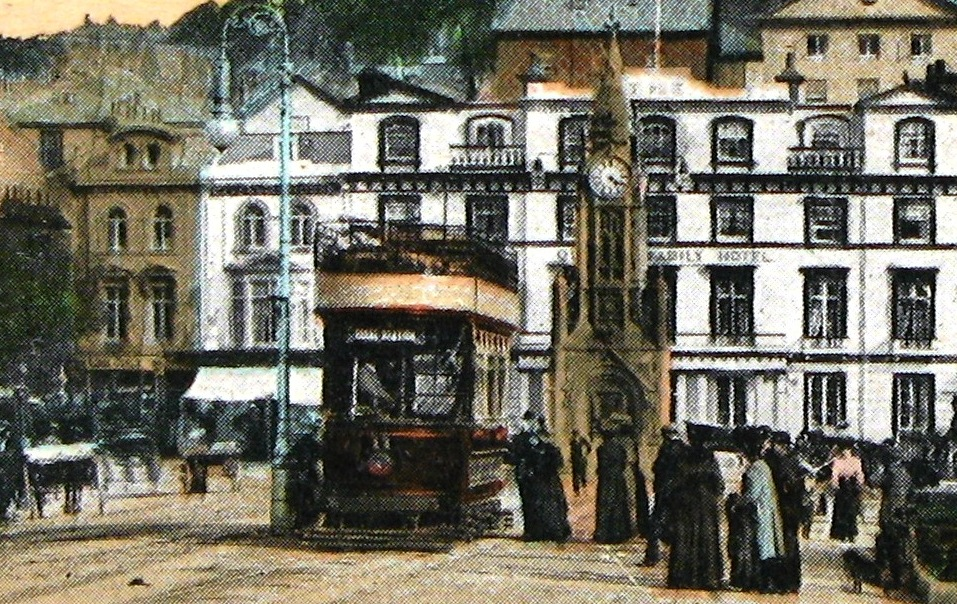
The clock in circa 1908 along with a Torquay Tram.

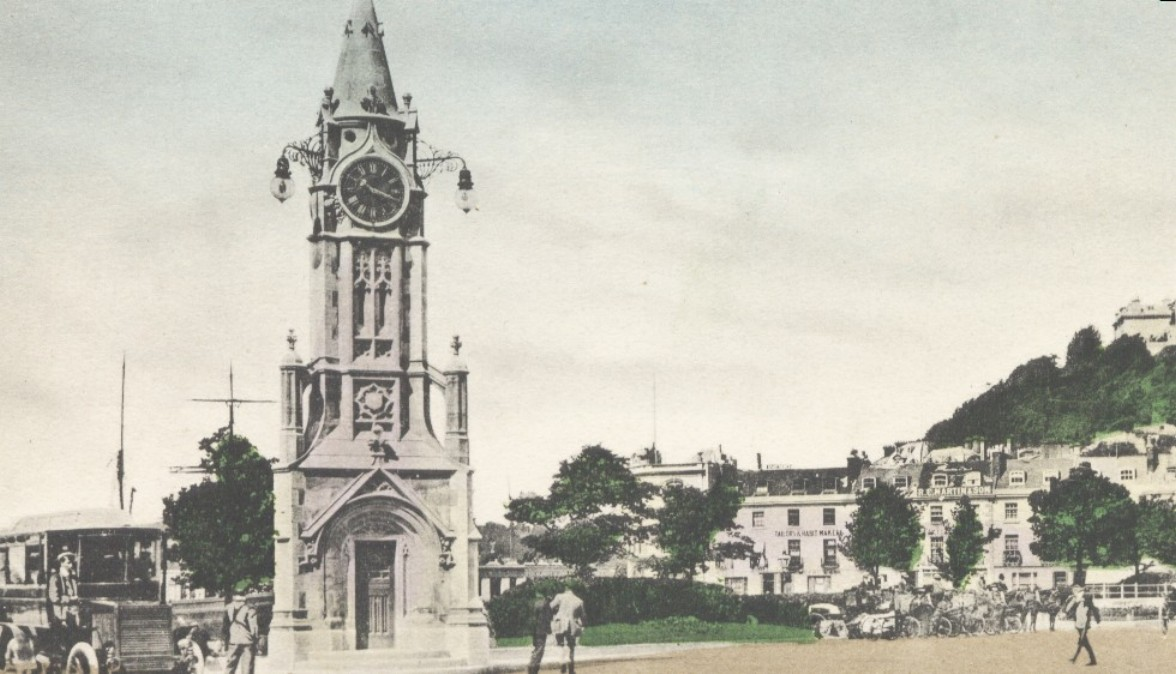
The clock in 1922.

In 2010 the tower was refurbished, funded by a £65,000 National Lottery Heritage Fund grant along with £30,000 from Torbay Council. During this renovation, the original bell, not having been rung since the beginning of the Second World War, was rediscovered wrapped up at the top of the tower. It was then reinstalled and now chimes again.

A local man named Keith Fursdon has wound the clock mechanism each week since 1963, and the council presented him with a certificate to honour his work in 2013. He was reported in 2021 as intending to continue this task until 2025.
