= Lincoln Corporation Tramways =

Tramway system in Lincolnshire, England

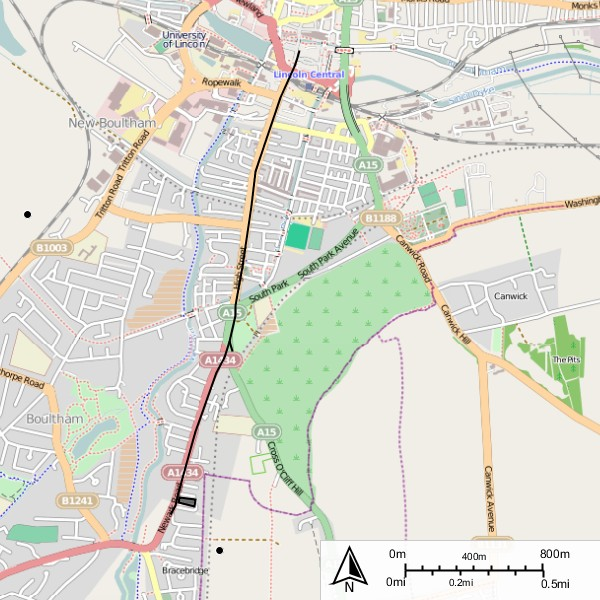
- Map of Lincoln Corporation Tramways

Operation
- Locale: Lincoln, England
- Open: 23 November 1905
- Close: 31 December 1929
- Status: Closed

Infrastructure
- Track gauge: 4 ft 8 1/2 in (1,435 mm)
- Propulsion system: Electric

Statistics
- Route length: 1.84 miles (2.96 km)

Lincoln Corporation Tramways operated an electric tramway service in Lincoln, England between 1905 and 1929.

== History ==
The tramway replaced the horse tram service previously provided by the Lincoln Tramways Company. The assets of this company were purchased by the Lincoln Corporation in July 1904 for the sum of £10,488 (equivalent to £1,102,600 in 2025). It was a single route from Bracebridge, along Newark Road and High Street to Cornhill. The depot was on the corner of Newark Road and Ellison Street at SK 9688 6851. The depot building survives to this day.

Eight Tramcars were purchased from the Brush Electric Company of Loughborough. The company livery was pale green and cream. After trial running which started on 29 October 1905, the tramway opened for public service on 23 November 1905. A council report mentions that 40,000 passengers were carried during the first eleven days.

The journey time was fifteen minutes, and this allowed a two-minute turnround. This made reasonable allowance for delays at the two level crossings. Typically, a minimum of three cars provided a scheduled ten-minute service, but at busy periods all eleven cars could be in service at the same time, and this offered a car every three minutes.

== Griffiths-Bedell stud system ==
The tramway was one of very few in England operated with a Griffiths-Bedell stud contact system in the roadway. This initial method of power provision survived until 1919 when this was replaced with overhead wires. The reason for the replacement was that gas leaked from the mains which found its way into the electric power cable conduit. This appeared in a startling and dangerous manner, as the gas ignited by the arcing of the magnetic switches, with the result that the cast iron covers for the inspection boxes were blown off, and on more than one occasion, hurled into the air. To minimise the risk of explosion, an electric blower was installed at the depot, and was started up every morning before the first car left the depot, and this blew a current of air through the conduit, clearing it of any gas.

The other main problem with the stud system, was the requirement to have a large magnetic contact under the tramcar to activate the studs. These magnetic contacts would collect any metal based debris (horse shoes etc.) left on the road surface. This occasionally caused a dead short, actuating the circuit breakers at the Brayford Power station, and bringing all cars to a halt.

By 1919, the corporation decided to replace the stud system with overhead wires.

== Accidents and incidents ==
The Electricity and Tramways Committee of the corporation reported on 6 June 1908 that there had been an explosion and claim for compensation for injuries received by Mrs. Blatherwick.

In 1913 a collision occurred between two cars and claims for injuries were deposited on behalf of four passengers.

== Closure ==
Only one tram route was ever operated; Lincoln Corporation had introduced motorbuses on other routes in 1920. The tram system was closed on 4 March 1929, and the trams were replaced by Leyland TD1 double-deck motorbuses.
