= Rotherham Tramway =

Tramway system in Yorkshire, England

Coordinates: 53.4324°N 1.3636°W

Rotherham Tramways
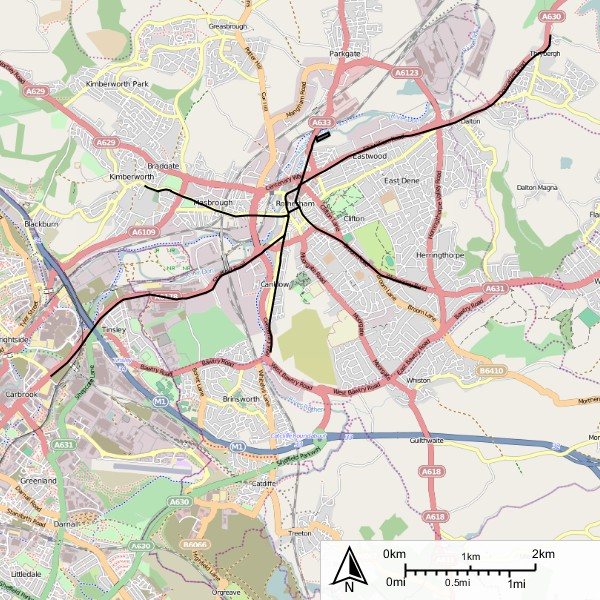
- Map of Rotherham Corporation Tramways

Operation
- Locale: Rotherham
- Open: 31 January 1903
- Close: 13 November 1949
- Status: Closed

Infrastructure
- Track gauge: 4 ft 8 1/2 in (1,435 mm) standard gauge
- Propulsion system: Electric

Statistics
- Route length: 11.55 miles (18.59 km)

The Rotherham Tramway was a tramway system serving the West Riding town of Rotherham. Service began on 31 January 1903 and ended on 13 November 1949.

The network of six lines spread across the town and was linked to the tramway networks of Sheffield and Mexborough and Swinton.

Rotherham tramways ran on six lines joining in the town's centre and serving Thrybergh, Silverwood Colliery and Broom Road to the East, Canklow and Sheffield to the South, Kimberworth to the West and Rawmarsh to the North.

The line to Sheffield was Rotherham's busiest as it served the main steel producing area of Great Britain. It required an almost constant flow of tramcars to meet demand. Track was re-laid in 1933 as well as single-ended double-decker tramcars purchased to serve on this particular line. Indeed, the line was built with loop termini. The tramcars used for the Sheffield-Rotherham service were equipped with only one entrance and staircase and like on traditional double-decker buses, seats were made to be comfortable. Tram service ended on this route in 1948 and Sheffield trams ended at Tinsley (where the change of owner occurred until 1926 when the Sheffield Corporation purchased the line up to Vulcan Road).

An extension of the line to Broom Top to Maltby was opened for trolleybuses in 1912, this being the third trolleybus line in Great Britain. Trolleybuses were permitted to reach the town centre in 1924 along with trams. Tram routes to Rawmarsh Road, Broom Road, Kimberworth and Thrybergh were converted to trolleybuses in 1929 and 1931. The line to Canklow was converted to motorbuses in 1934.

Double-decker trolleybuses were built from the single-deck fleet from 1955. Twenty-three of these were sold in Spain with the last trolleybus running in 1965.

Trams returned to Rotherham in October 2018 when the Sheffield Supertram was extended to Parkgate.
