= Lincoln Tramways Company =

Defunct Company of tramway services in England

Operation
- Locale: Lincoln, England
- Open: 8 September 1882
- Close: 22 July 1905
- Status: Closed

Infrastructure
- Track gauge: 4 ft 8 1/2 in (1,435 mm)
- Propulsion system: Horse

Statistics
- Route length: 1.75 miles (2.82 km)

Lincoln Tramways Company operated a horse-drawn tramway service in Lincoln, England, between 1882 and 1905.

== History ==
The tramway company was established in 1880 with share capital of £20,000. The company had ambitions for a substantial network of lines, but in the event, the only line constructed was from Bracebridge to St. Benedict's Square, along Newark Road and High Road. The depot was on the corner of Newark Road and Ellison Street at SK 9688 6851 and became known locally as Tram Stables.

Major General Hutchinson from the Board of Trade inspected the system on 6 September 1882 and following minor adjustments to the track in the High Street, it opened 2 days later, on 8 September 1882.

The journey between St Benedict's Square and Bracebridge was covered in 20 minutes, and consisted of two stages of one penny each (Cranwell House, near St. Botoph's Church, being the intermediate point).

In 1901 the directors of the company introduced half-penny fares for workmen, which brought about a dramatic increase in patronage.

== Vehicles ==
There were 10 tramcars according to an inventory of 1903. All were single horse operated except for 7 and 8 on busy days which could be operated by a pair. No's 7 and 8 are believed to have been purchased second hand from Gravesend in 1899.

- No.1. Ashbury's 1882, 16 seats
- No.2. Ashbury's 1882, 16 seats
- No.3. Ashbury's 1883, 16 seats
- No.4. Ashbury's 1883, 22 seats
- No.5. Ashbury's 1884, 22 seats
- No.6. Ashbury's 1885, 22 seats
- No.7. Company's make, 1899, toastrack, 32 seats
- No.8. Company's make, 1889, toastrack, 32 seats
- No.9. Falcon Engine & Car Works 1900, 18 seats
- No.10. Falcon Engine & Car Works 1900, 18 seats

== Closure ==
The system was taken over by the Lincoln Corporation Tramways, a company formed by the Lincoln Corporation for the purpose of modernising the tramway. The system was bought by the Lincoln Corporation in July 1904 for the sum of £10,488 (equivalent to £1,102,600 in 2025), and the last horse tram ran on 22 July 1905, the system then being closed for reconstruction. The running of the last horse tram attracted a large crowd and the tramcar was specially decorated for the occasion.

On 25 July 1905, the unusable assets of the company were put up for auction. Seven tramcars and 22 horses were auctioned. There is a story that one of the horses was bought by a cab owner in Nottingham who later sold it as each time it reached the tram lines in Nottingham, it would turn and follow them!
