= Mexborough and Swinton Tramway =

Tramway system in England

The Mexborough and Swinton Tramways Company was a tramway system in the West Riding of Yorkshire, England, founded in 1902 and which began services in 1907 linking Rotherham with the Old Toll Bar, Mexborough. Its routes served Manvers Main Colliery, Wath upon Dearne and the towns of Rotherham, Rawmarsh, Swinton and Mexborough.

== Early history ==
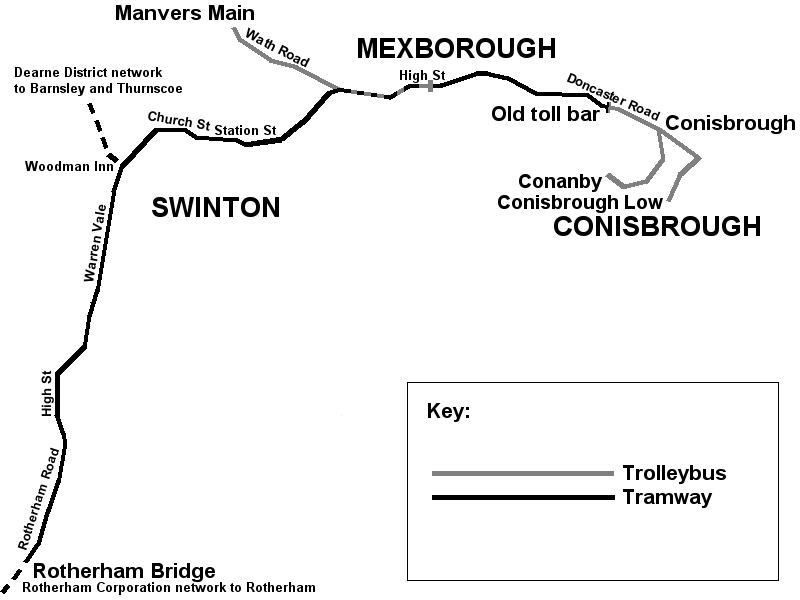
The Mexborough & Swinton tramway network in 1920.

Although plans were originally put forward in 1876 and again in 1881 it was not until August 1905 that construction of a standard gauge 4 ft 8 1/2 in (1,435 mm) tramway finally commenced. The system commenced with a connection to that operated by Rotherham Corporation at the borough boundary, the point where the road crossed a small bridge on Earl Fitzwilliam’s Greasbrough Canal close by Rotherham Road railway station. The line ran through Parkgate, Rawmarsh, Swinton and Mexborough before terminating at the Old Toll Bar at the east end of Mexborough, a point just prior to the crossing of the South Yorkshire Navigation.

The system was built by the National Electric Construction Company (NEC), which owned other systems in England, using the Dolter system of stud contact power supply (the reason given for this being the unsightliness of conventional overhead wiring) and public services began on Wednesday 6 February 1907 with a route linking College Square, Rotherham and Parkgate, this being extended to the company’s Dale Road depot in Rawmarsh three days later. The remainder of the line opened on 3 August. In the Dolter system the current was supplied from metal studs placed between the rails that became live and rose from the road to energize the motors of the tram passing over, being then supposed to become dead. This proved unsatisfactory since on occasions the studs remained upright and live so that horses following the tram hauling drays could receive an electric shock. In August 1908, following instructions from the Board of Trade, the company converted their system to overhead pick-up.

== The network ==
The original Mexborough and Swinton Tramways Act 1902 also provided for a branch to serve Manvers Main colliery; this was never built. In 1915 the company opened two trolleybus routes: the first ran from Mexborough town centre to Manvers although failing to reach the main gates of the colliery due to a low bridge below the Midland Railway line; the second ran from the Old Toll Bar to Conisbrough, the terminus being two miles away from that of Doncaster Corporation's tramways. Manvers is the only locality in England to have had a trolleybus before a tramway.

Mexborough and Swinton's lines were in contact with other tramway companies' line in two localities. It met the Dearne District Light Railways at Woodman Inn, Swinton, and the Rotherham Tramway at the borough boundary.

== Rolling stock ==
The tramway passed beneath two low bridges at Parkgate and Swinton. Because of this, the sixteen Mexborough trams and the Rotherham trams used for through joint service to and from the town were fitted with low-height top covers.

== Conversion ==
The tramways were closed and the routes became operated by twenty single-deck trolleybuses in 1928 and 1929. The company also removed the word "tramways" from its title and replaced it with "traction" to reflect this change in vehicles. The Mexborough and Swinton Traction Company was born, becoming part of the British Electric Traction Group in 1931.
