= Torquay Tramways =

Former English tram company

Torquay
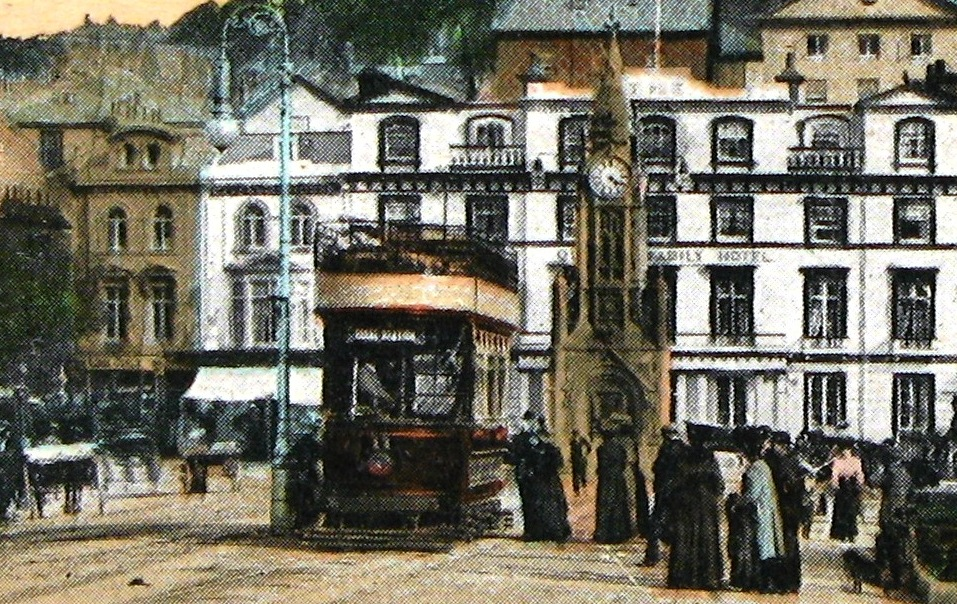
- A tram on The Strand by the harbour

Operation
- Locale: Torquay, Devon
- Open: 1907
- Close: 1934
- Routes: 5
- Owner: Torquay Tramways Company

Infrastructure
- Track gauge: 3 ft 6 in (1,067 mm)
- Propulsion system: Electric
- Depot(s): St Marychurch

Statistics
- Route length: 9.1 miles (14.6 km)

Torquay Tramways operated electric street trams in Torquay, Devon, England, from 1907. They were initially powered by the unusual Dolter stud-contact electrification, but in 1911 was converted to more conventional overhead-line supply. The line was extended into neighbouring Paignton in 1911 but the whole network was closed in 1934.

== History ==
Torquay developed as a seaside resort during the 19th century, spreading across the hills above Tor Bay. The South Devon Railway opened a station at Torre on the hill above the town in 1848, and the line was extended to Paignton in 1859 when another station was provided near the Abbey Sands.

Around the end of 1901 two different companies proposed to build electric tramways to link Torquay and Paignton. These schemes failed to get started, but in 1902 the Dolter Electric Company was invited build a line instead that would use their stud-contact system of electrification. A poll was conducted of the ratepayers of Torquay; a small majority was in favour of a tramway being built but not for the council to either build or operate it. The Torquay Tramways Act 1904 (4 Edw. 7. c. cciv) was passed on 15 August 1904, authorising a network of 8.92 miles (14.36 km) 3 ft 6 in (1,067 mm) gauge tracks and the Dolter power supply.

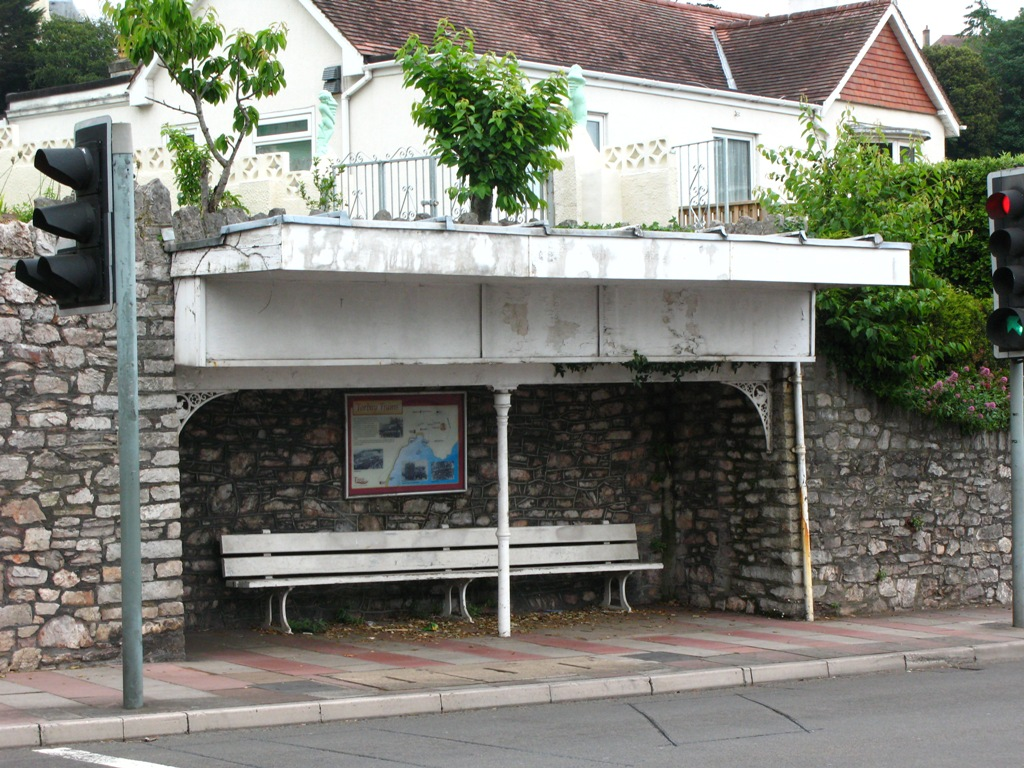
The tram terminus at Torre railway station

Construction was started in by the National Electric Construction Company (NECC) 1905 and the electrical system was installed by the Dolter Electric Company during 1906. The first trials took place in December but official testing by the Board of Trade did not take place until 7 March 1907. The public opening was then able to take place on 5 April 1907, but the line to Babbacombe was not ready until the end of the year and that along the seafront was completed on 16 April 1908.

The Dolter company had obtained the act of Parliament and ordered the trams but the NECC, who had been contracted by them to lay the tracks, registered a subsidiary company in December 1907 named the Torquay Tramways Company to take over the Dolter company's operations in Torquay. This company obtained the Torquay and Paignton Tramways Act 1909 (9 Edw. 7. c. cxxxiv) on 16 August 1909 to extend the seafront line 2.31 miles (3.72 km) to Hyde Road, Paignton. The council in Paignton insisted that the tram's power supply in their town was to be by overhead trolley wire rather than the Dolter stud system. Work on erecting trolley wires above the existing tracks started late in 1910 and was completed on 6 March 1911. The new line to Paignton was opened on 17 July 1911. The Dolter tram cars were rebuilt to collect current from the overhead wire.

In 1920 the company started to operate buses to Newton Abbot and beyond but in 1922 they were transferred to Devon General when that business became a subsidiary of the NECC. In 1925, at the instigation of the Torquay Council, the Babbacombe Cliff Railway was operated by the Torquay Tramways Company.

With the aim of extending further into Paignton, permission was sought in 1933 to convert to trolleybuses, but the Western National Omnibus Company objected and the necessary act of Parliament was not passed. Instead the company decided to convert its routes to motor bus operation. Parliament gave permission in the Torquay and Paignton Tramways (Abandonment) Act 1933 (23 & 24 Geo. 5. c. xxxviii) on 18 July 1933. Trams to Paignton were replaced by buses on 14 January 1934 and the remaining services ceased on 31 January 1934.

== Tram routes ==
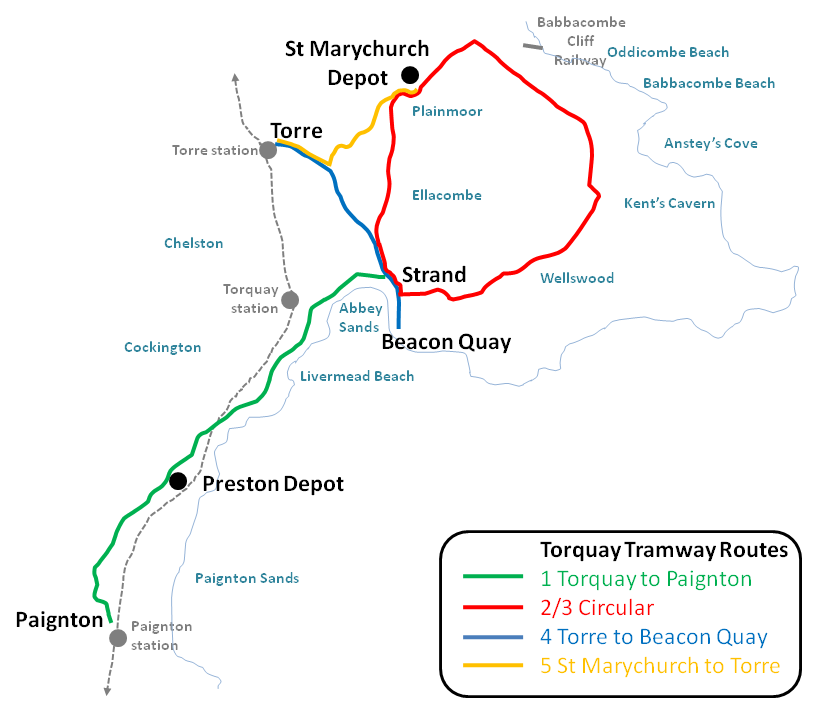
The routes operated

The location of the electricity generating station and depot was changed before construction was started, so some of the tracks authorised by the initial Torquay Tramways Act 1904 were not built. The network in 1907 therefore consisted of just 6.79 miles (10.93 km). The extension to Paignton brought the network to 9.1 miles (14.6 km).

The centre of the network was The Strand alongside the inner harbour at Torquay from where lines went north-east to Torre station and north-west to Babbacombe (which connected by two different connecting lines), and south to Paignton. The timetables identified five numbered routes:

1. Torquay to Paignton
2. Circular via Wellswood
3. Circular via Ellacombe
4. Torre station to Beacon Quay
5. St Marychurch to Torre station

== Depot ==
The company's depot was built in Westhill Avenue, St Marychurch (which was sometimes known as Plainmoor). A garage was built in 1921 to cater for the bus fleet. A petrol tank exploded on 3 June 1921, destroying the body of one bus and damaging two trams, five other motor vehicles and the sheds. After the bus fleet was transferred to Devon General that company bought the bus garage and this was their main depot in the area until a new larger one was built on the Newton Road. After the trams were withdrawn the depot was sold to Torquay Corporation, who used it for its refuse trucks and other vehicles until 1992.

The opening of the Paignton extension saw the construction of a smaller tram depot at Preston.

A depot for four buses was built in The Avenue, Newton Abbot in 1921 to house buses used on routes outside Torquay.

== Power supply ==
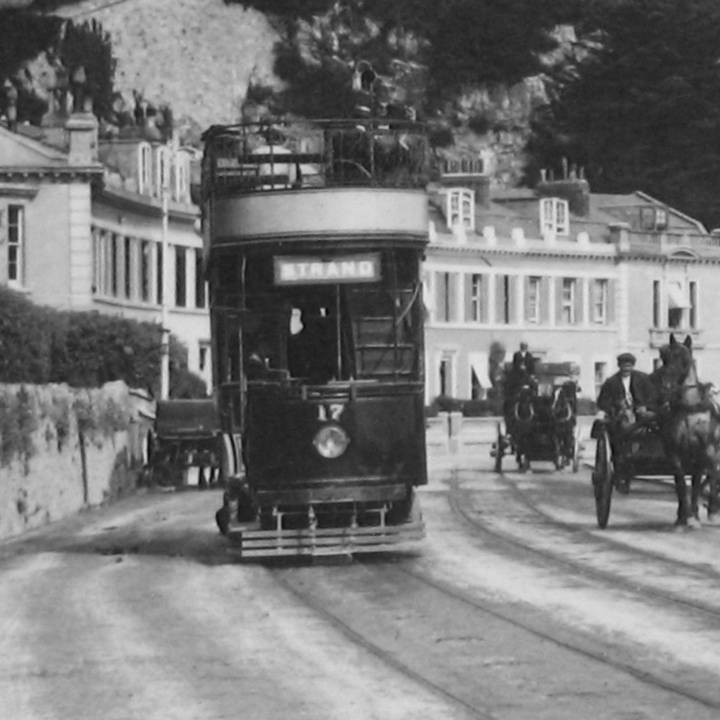
Car 17 using the Doulter system in Torbay Road - the stud covers are the dark marks between the rails

The town council of Torquay did not want their seaside resort disfigured by the poles and overhead wires of a conventional electric tramway and so invited the Dolter Electric Traction Company to construct a tramway using their stud-contact system.

A conductor cable was laid in a trench between the rails. At 9-foot (2.7 m) intervals a box was fitted between the rails that contained a stud (which protruded about 1 inch (25 mm) above the road) and a bell crank. A magnet on a passing tram attracted this crank which then moved to make contact between the conductor cable and stud; once the tram moved away the crank dropped away and the stud was no longer connected to the cable. A long skate was suspended beneath each tramcar which was magnetised by electro-magnets and so both operated the cranks and collected the current that both moved the tram car and powered the electro-magnets. A small battery was carried to charge the electro-magnets should the power be interrupted. The negative return current passed through the rails.

A horse was killed after it stepped on a live stud during construction of the tramway in Torquay. Each tram car was then fitted with a bell connected to a special contact arm to warn the driver if a stud remained live after it had passed. The conductor of the tram then had to reset the crank using an insulated mallet. During the Board of Trade inspection of the tramway four such studs were detected during about 8 miles (13 km) of tests. There were also frequent problems with trams being stopped when a stud failed to be made live when needed. On 27 January 1910 a snow storm stopped all the trams as they couldn't make contact with the studs.

Electricity was supplied from Torquay town council's generating station on Beacon Quay.

== Engineering ==
The track was 3 ft 6 in (1,067 mm) gauge. The steepest gradient was 1 in 11 (9%) for 440 yards (400 m). The sharpest curve was 31 feet (9.4 m) radius.

== Trams ==
Trams were painted maroon lined in gold or yellow with the window pillars, rocker and upper deck sheeting in cream. The initial network opened with a fleet of 18 tram cars. By 1925 this had expanded to 42 cars.

Numbers	In service	Type	Seats	Builder	Truck	Comments
1–18	1907–1934	Double deck, four-wheel	49	Brush	Mountain & Gibson Radial (Seven cars rebuilt with Brill 21E trucks)	Six cars sold to Plymouth Tramways.
19–33	1910–1934	Double deck, four wheel	49	Brush	Brill 21E	
34–36	1921–1934	Single deck, four-wheel	24	Brush	Brush A1	New to Taunton Tramway in 1905.
37–40	1923–1934	Double deck, bogie	76	Brush	Brush Maximum Traction	Sold to Plymouth Tramways
41–42	1925–1934	Double deck, bogie	72	Brush	Brush Maximum Traction	Sold to Plymouth Tramways

== Buses ==
A number of operators each ran a small number of motor or steam buses in the area. In July 1914 the Torquay Tramways Company ordered three single-deck buses but they were diverted away from Torquay by the government before delivery because of the impending war. After the war was over, a new order was placed in July 1919. The first three started to operate between Torre (where they connected with the trams) and Newton Abbot on 3 May 1920. More buses were delivered during the month and on 20 May the route was extended from Torre down to The Strand, and new routes ran from The Strand to Shaldon and from Newton Abbot to Dawlish. In 1921 routes were added from Paignton to Brixham and from Torquay to Buckfastleigh via Newton Abbot and Ashburton.

The Devon General Omnibus and Touring Company had started bus services between Exeter and Torquay in 1919 with three vehicles and soon expanded their fleet and area of operation. On 22 June 1922 Devon General was purchased by the Torquay Tramway Company on behalf of the NECC. The tramway buses were transferred to Devon General.

The buses were painted in the same maroon and cream livery as the trams. The fleet was a mixture of single-deck buses, open top double-deck buses, and open-sided charabancs.

Numbers	Registrations (Note: Fleet numbers were not necessarily in the same order as registration numbers.)	New	Type	Seats	Chassis	Body
1–9 (Note: The body of number 3 was destroyed in the depot fire on 3 June 1921. The chassis was provided in 1922 with a new body built by Strachan and Brown and thenceforth carried registration TA 3094.)	T 8188–T 8204 (Note: Only even numbered registrations were issued in the block T 8188–T 8204.)	1920	Single-deck	26	AEC YC	Brush
10–12	TA 1008–TA 1010	1921	Charabanc	30	Daimler Y	Roberts
13–15	TA 1004 – TA 1006	1921	Double-deck	46	AEC K	LGOC
16–18	TA 1168–TA 1170	1921	Double-deck	46	AEC K	LGOC
19–24	T 8192, TA 1676–TA 1679	1921	Charabanc	30	Daimler Y	?
?	TA 1934	1921	Charabanc	30	Daimler Y	?
25–28	TA 3797–TA TA 3848 (Note: The charabancs delivered in 1922 were issued the registrations TA 3797, TA 3802, TA 3803 and TA 3848.)	1922	Charabanc	28	Daimler Y	?
29–36	TA 3794–TA 3849 (Note: The buses delivered in 1922 were registered TA 3794–T A 3796, TA 3798–TA 3801 and TA 3849.)	1922	Single-deck	32	Daimler Y	Strachan and Brown

== See also ==
- Open top buses in Torbay
