= Current collector =

Device that carries electrical power from lines or rails

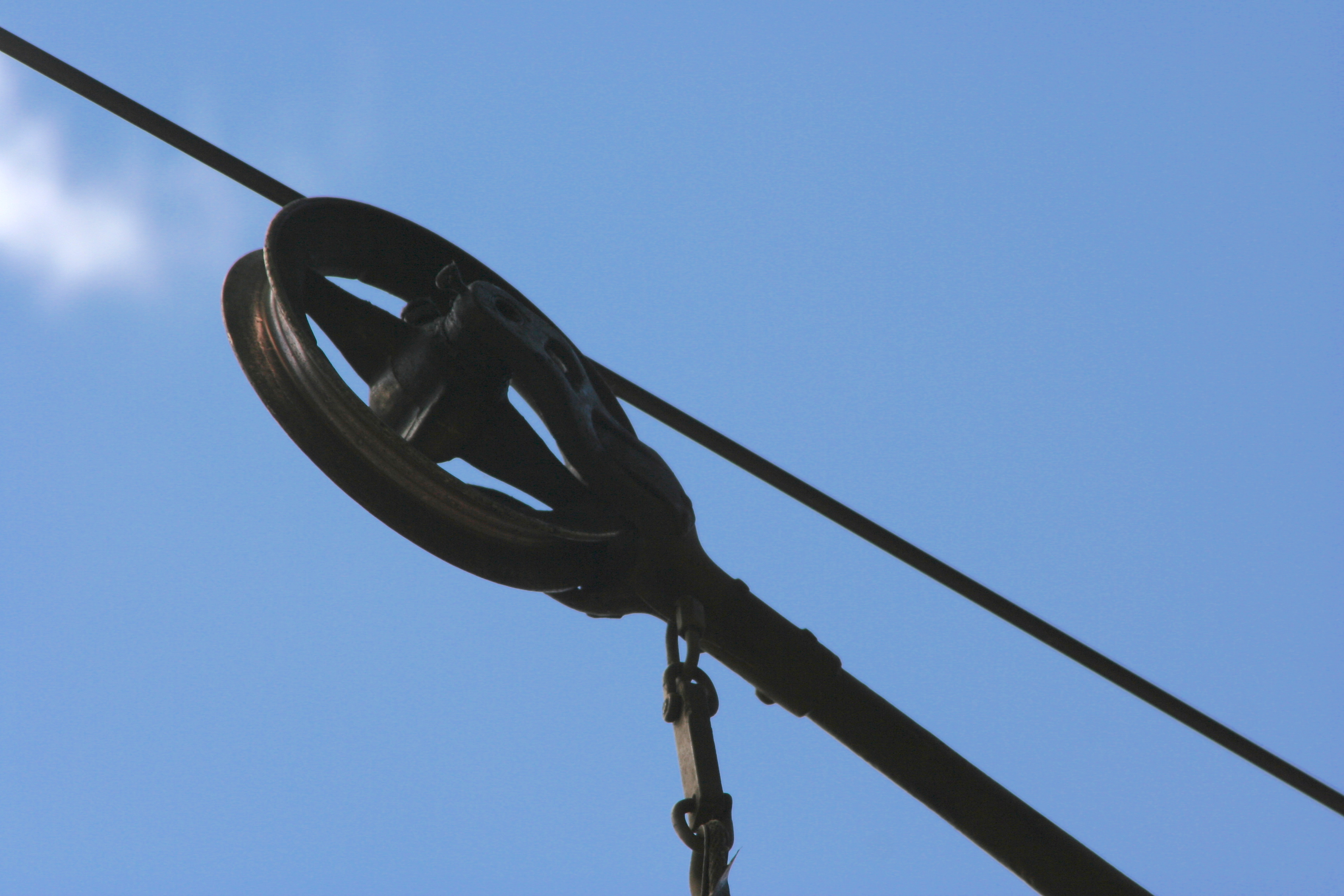
Trolley pole wheel on top of the trolley pole of Twin City Rapid Transit Company No. 1300

A current collector (often called a "pickup") is a device used in trolleybuses, trams, electric locomotives and EMUs to carry electric power (current) from overhead lines, electric third rails, or ground-level power supplies to the electrical equipment of the vehicles. Those for overhead wires are roof-mounted devices, those for rails are mounted on the bogies.

Typically, electric current connectors have one or more spring-loaded arms that press a collector or contact shoe against the rail or overhead wire. As the vehicle moves, the contact shoe slides along the wire or rail to draw the electricity needed to run the vehicle's motor.

The current collector arms are electrically conductive but mounted insulated on the vehicle's roof, side or base. An insulated cable connects the collector with the switch, transformer or motor. The steel rails of the tracks act as the electrical return.

== Pantographs and poles ==
Electric vehicles that collect their current from an overhead line system use different forms of one- or two-arm pantograph collectors, bow collectors or trolley poles. The current collection device presses against the underside of the lowest wire of an overhead line system, which is called a contact wire.

Most overhead supply systems are either DC or single phase AC, using a single wire with return through the grounded running rails. Three phase AC systems use a pair of overhead wires, and paired trolley poles.

Electric overhead cranes and gantry cranes may use a current collector system to provide power over the full length of their operating area. The current collector assembly use sliding shoes that run on rails. Depending on the size of crane, contact rails may be copper wires, copper bars, or steel channels. mounted on insulating supports. Two rails are used for DC supply, and three for three-phase AC, with grounding of the crane through contact with the runway rails. The contact rails are mounted out of the reach of people working in the area to prevent an electric shock hazard.

Overhead current collectors

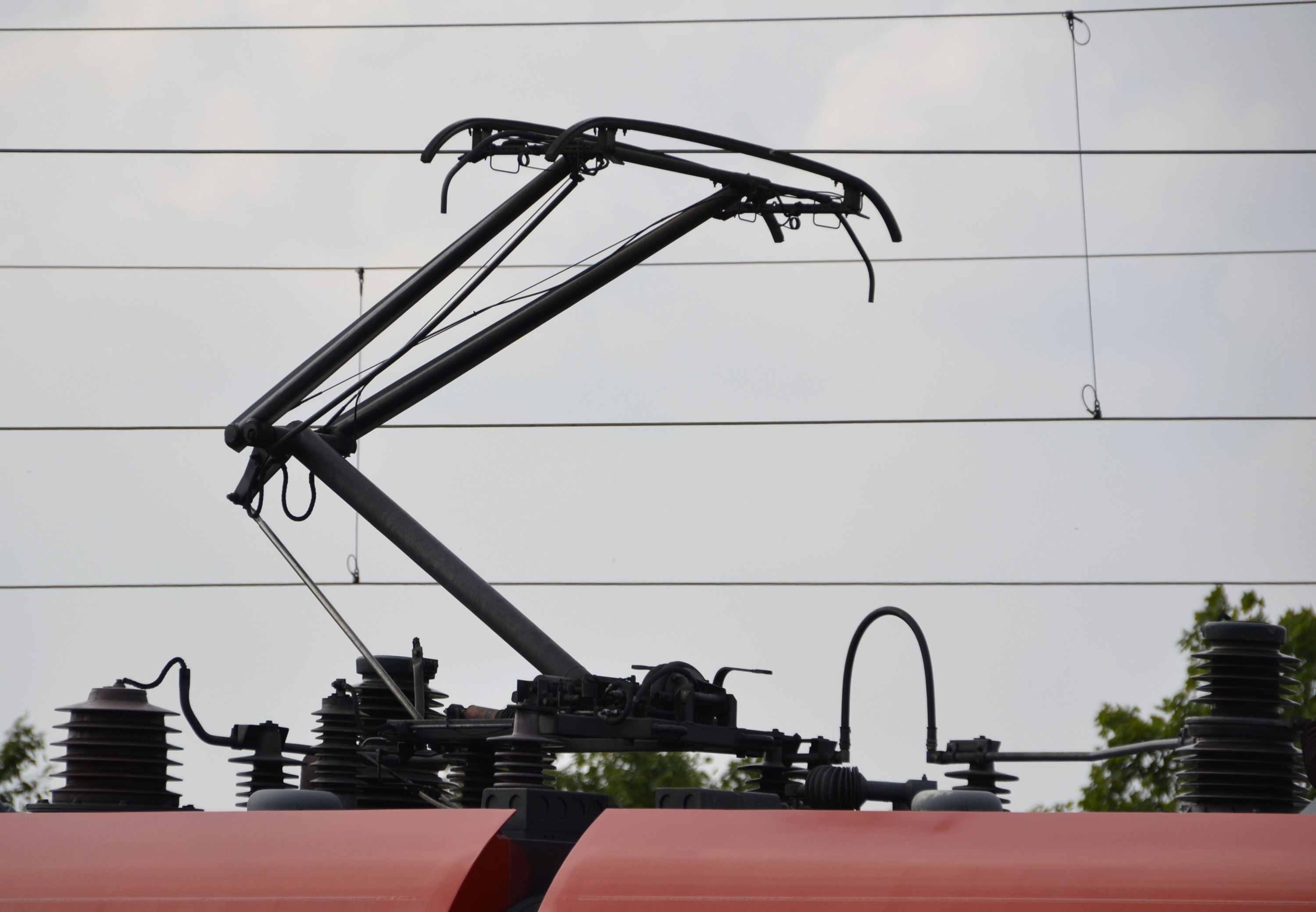
Modern one-arm "pantograph" collector with double collector shoes

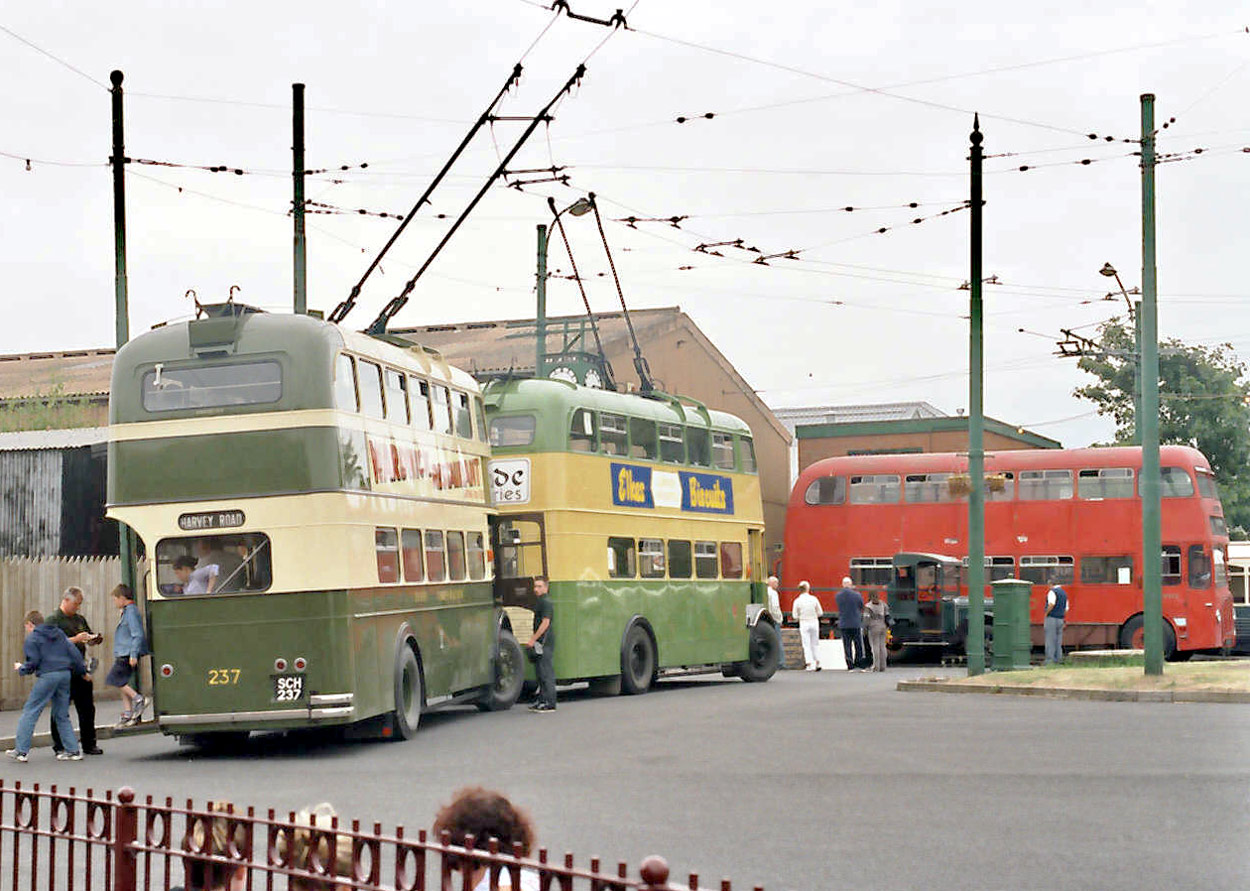
Trolleybuses with trolley-type current collectors, i.e. trolley poles on trolley wires

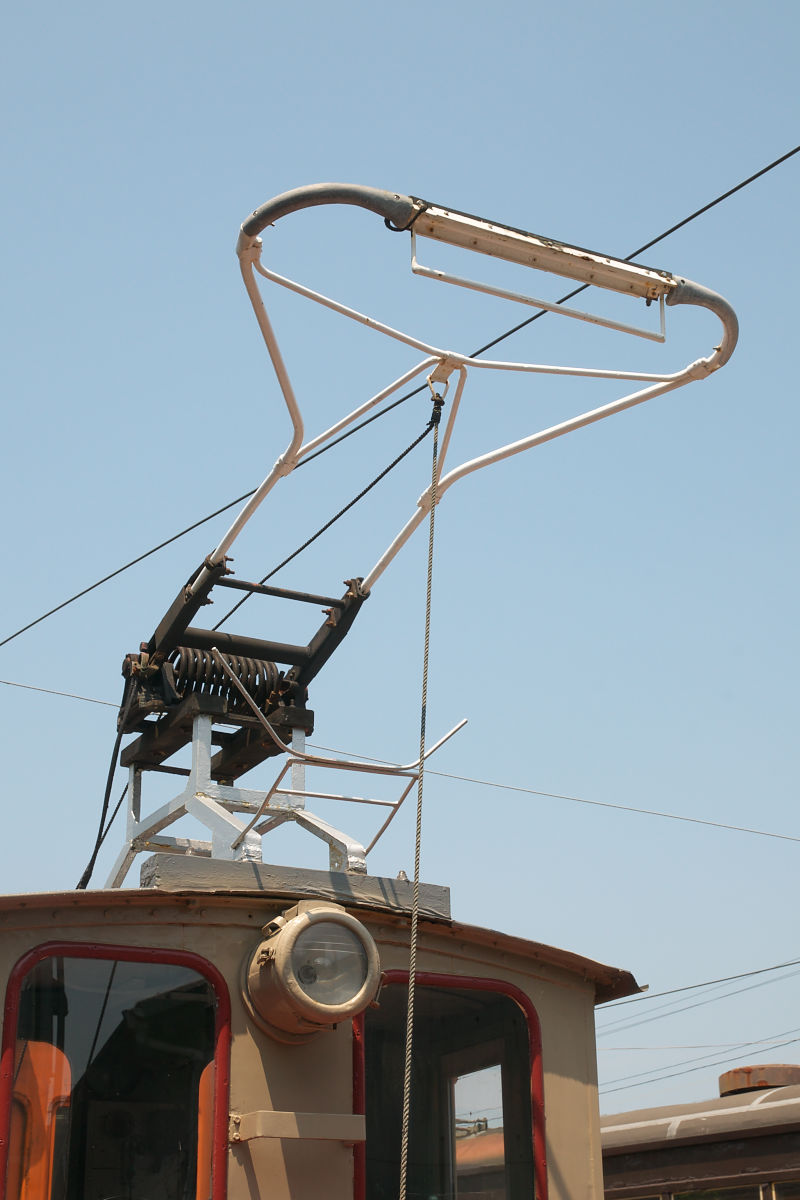
A bow collector on a small electric locomotive

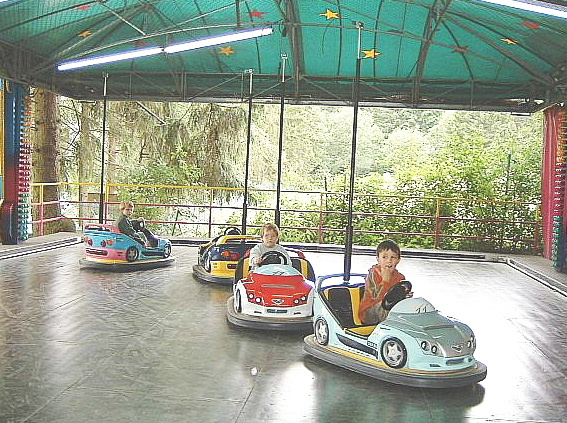
Bumper cars at Taunus Wunderland showing collector poles.

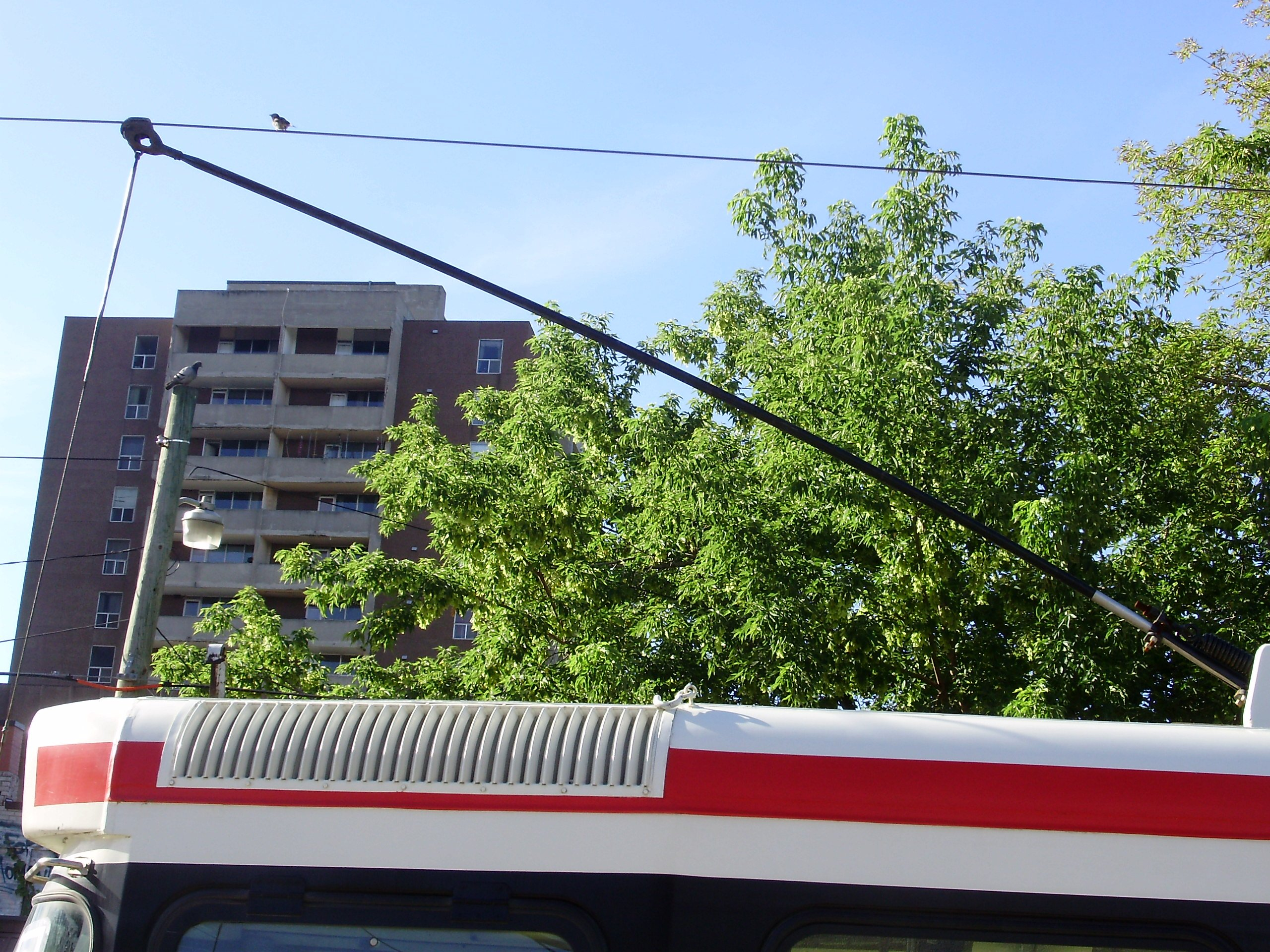
A trolley pole on a streetcar of the Toronto streetcar system

=== Trolley pole wheel ===
The trolley pole wheel is a grooved contact wheel mounted on top of the trolley pole instead of a trolley shoe. The trolley pole wheel somewhat resembles a pulley. Trolley pole wheels are now rarely used.

=== Collector pole ===
A collector pole is the pole at the end of a bumper car. It has a contact shoe on top.

== Contact shoe ==
Electric railways with third rails or fourth rails carry collector or contact shoes, projecting laterally (sideways), or vertically, from their bogies. The contact shoe may slide on top of the third rail (top running), on the bottom (bottom running) or on the side (side running). The side running contact shoe is used against the guide bars on rubber-tired metros. A vertical contact shoe is used on fourth rail systems. A pair of contact shoes was used on underground current collection systems. Contact shoes may also be used on overhead conductor rails, on guide bars or on trolley wires in the case of trams or trolleybuses. Most railways use three rails, while the London Underground uses four rails. Trams or trolleybuses use a grooved trolley shoe at the end of a trolley pole. A contact shoe is used as a ground on the running rail of a rubber-tired metro.

=== Contact ski ===
A long and narrow contact shoe shaped like a ski, or "skid" or "ski collector" or "contact ski", was historically used on stud contact systems so it maintains contact with small studs in the road placed at large intervals. A single ski was as long as 12 feet (3.7 m) in some systems. Stud contact systems were short-lived due to safety issues with the studs. They were supposed to be electrified only when compatible vehicles passed over them, but the studs often malfunctioned and remained electrified continuously, posing an electrocution hazard.

Contact shoes

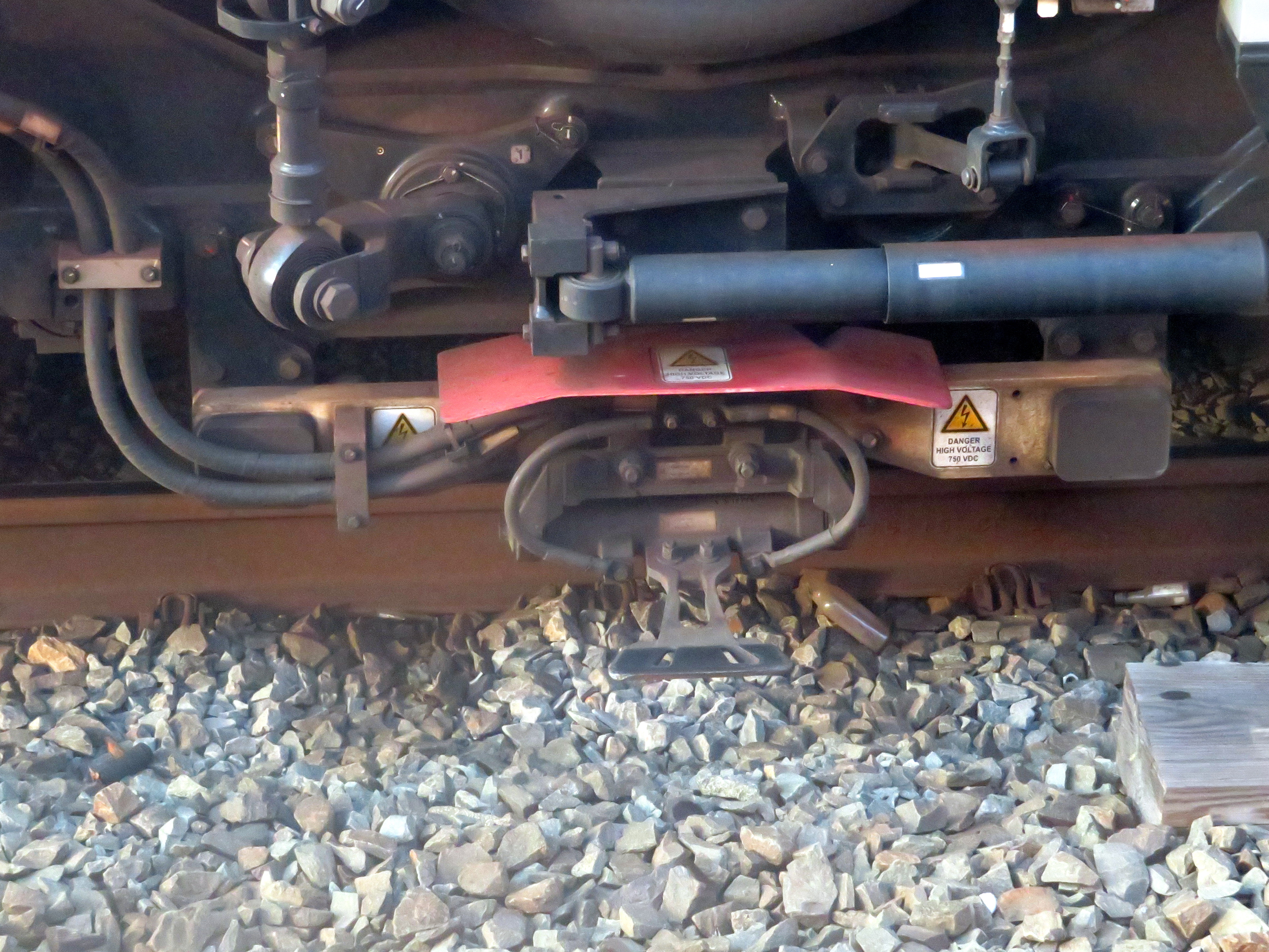
Contact shoe on Metro-North M8 railcar, designed for both over- and under-running third rail

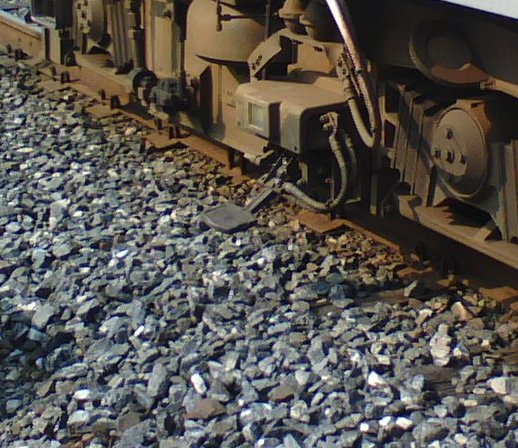
A contact shoe for top-contact third rail on SEPTA's Norristown High Speed Line (third rail not visible)

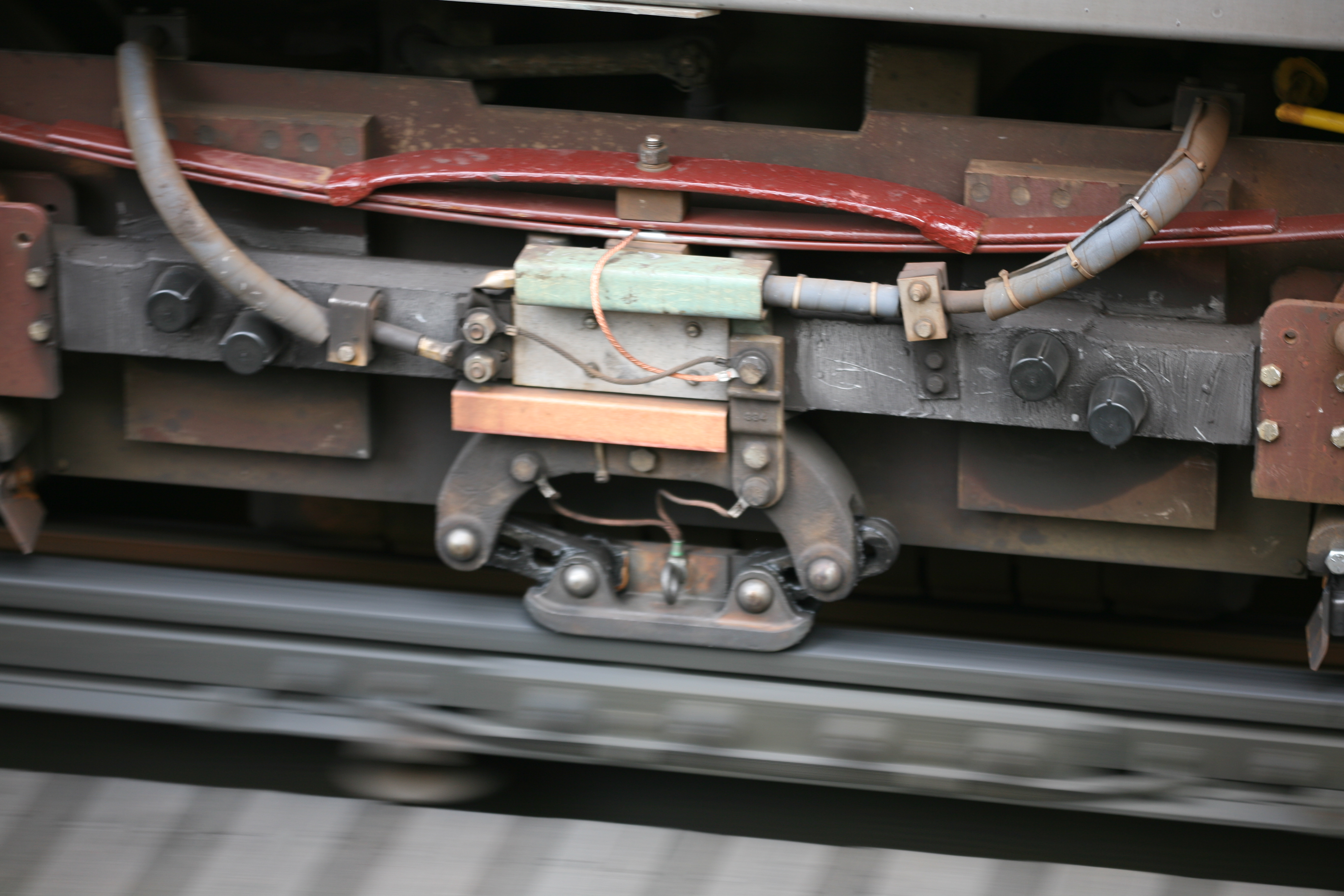
The contact shoe on a Chicago 'L' car

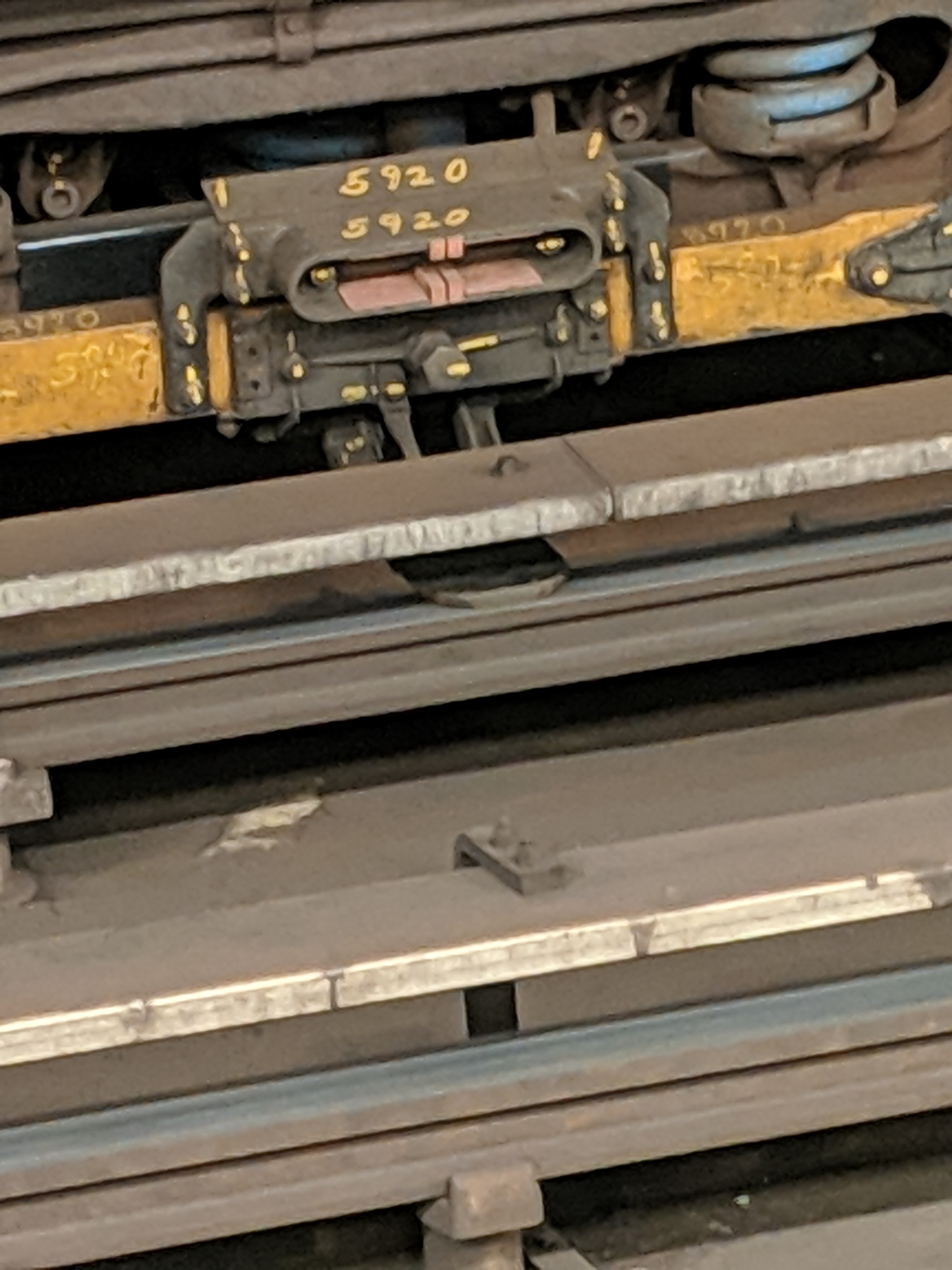
The contact shoe of a NYC Subway car making contact with the third rail

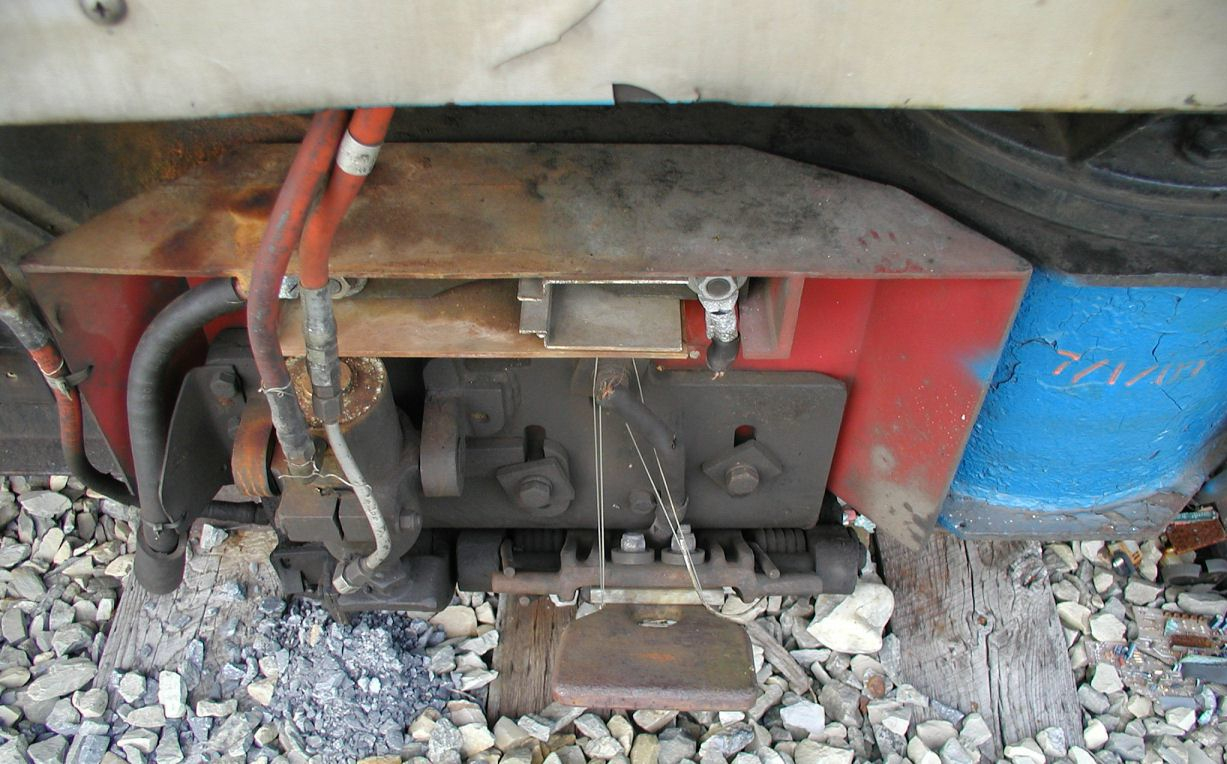
Third-rail contact shoe installed on the front bogie of an RTL-II car for operation into New York Penn Station

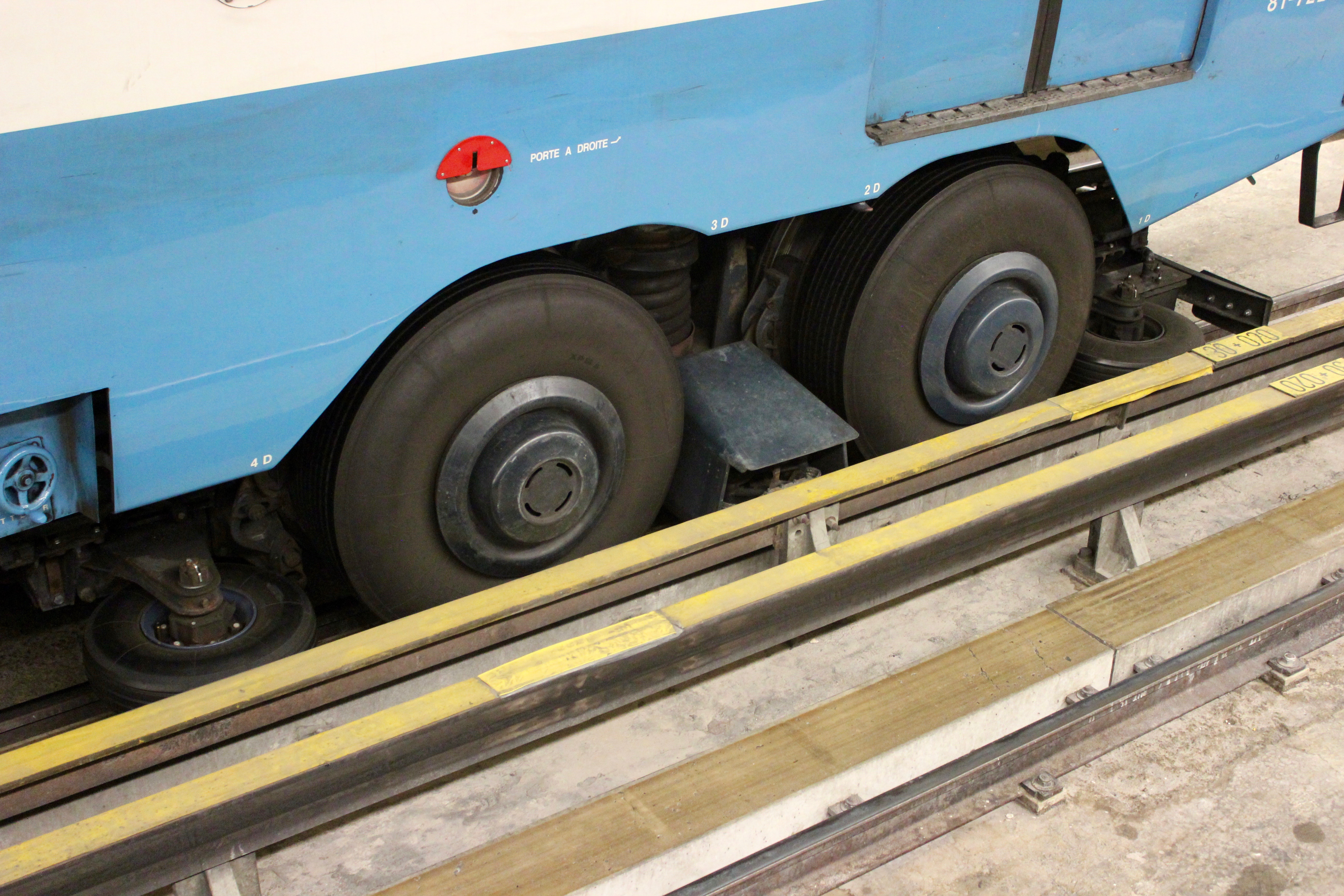
A rubber-tyred metro bogie. Between the two large tires, a contact shoe touches the guidebar and electrically grounds the car.

== See also ==
- Bumper cars
- Conduit current collection
- Electromote
- Guide bar
- List of railway electrification systems
- Overhead line
- Pantographs and underbody collectors
- Railway electrification systems
