= Stud contact system =

Power supply system for electric trams

The stud contact system is an obsolete ground-level power supply system for electric trams. The studs were insulating, ceramic cylinders with their tops flush with the road surface, and a conductive, cast iron contact stud located in the top of the cylinder. The cast iron stud stood about one inch (25mm) higher than the ceramic cylinder. Each stud contained a switch mechanism that made an electrical connection between the cast iron top of the stud and an underground cable when a tramcar with a strong magnet at its underside passed over it, before disconnecting when the car moved away. Electrical current was collected from the studs by a "skate" or "ski collector" under the tramcar.

Stud contact systems were implemented from 1899 to 1921, and were short-lived due to safety issues. For example, one system by Diatto had switches that contained mercury, which often leaked or adhered to the side of the stud cylinder and kept the exposed top electrified. A system by Dolter implemented switches with pivot arms, which tended to get stuck in the electrified position. Similar systems were operated by Thomson-Houston in Monaco from 1898 to 1903, by František Křižík in Prague on the King Charles Bridge from 1903 to 1908, and others such as Griffiths-Bedell, Lorain, and Robrow. Like conduit current collection systems and the modern ground-level power supply systems, stud contact systems were chosen for aesthetic reasons when overhead wire systems would be obtrusive.

== Collectors ==
Most electric railway systems take the power from an external generator. This means the electricity has to be collected while the locomotive is moving. In this context a locomotive refers to any electric vehicle on a railway track or tramway track.

Generally electric locomotives collect power through a third rail or an overhead wire. The full circuit is completed by track rails. For main line railways with their protected lines overhead lines and third rails are not a problem. Tramways operate in cities. This means that the third rail system is not really practical. It has been used, protection being offered to other road users by placing it in a central groove. Even so, the ingress of dirt and water can cause problems.

An alternative solution is to use studs. All the systems have a switch in the stud and a means to switch on the stud only while it is covered by the moving vehicle. As at least one stud must be covered by the collector at all times a long collector is used. The length has to be slightly greater than the maximum distance between any two studs. This collector is known as a skate or ski collector. This type of electrical power collector needs to move in the vertical plane to allow for natural differences in the height of the power supply studs. It is used on some full size tramway systems where there is a need for overhead wires not to be used, usually in areas of scenic value.

== Model railways ==
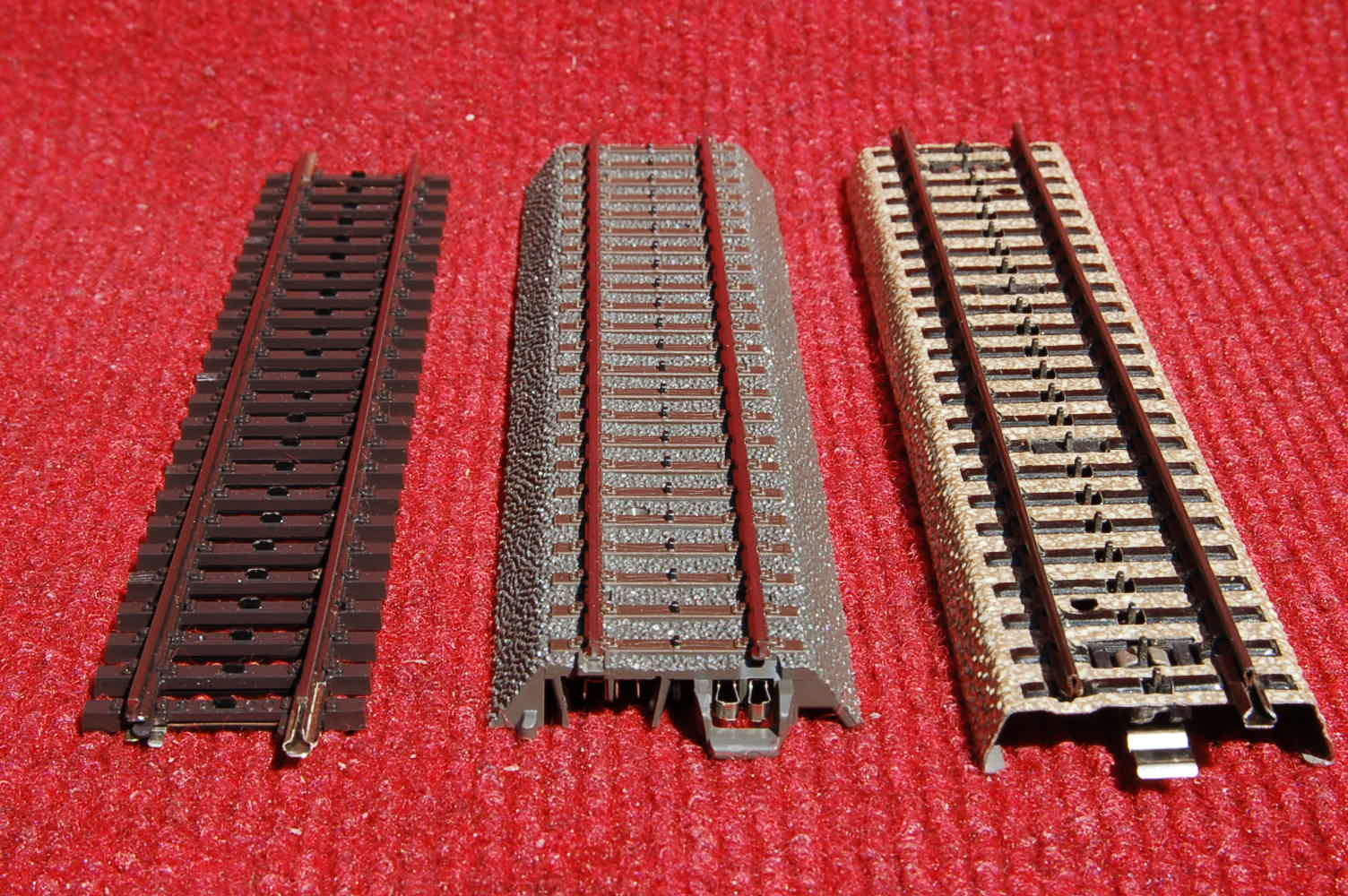
Three ages of Märklin H0 scale track

The stud contact system is also used on model railway systems (e.g. Märklin) as the center line of studs is less obtrusive than a single central rail. For outdoor model railway systems the use of a stud supply system with a skate/ski collector has certain practical advantages. The system is inherently self-cleaning. While the track may not be perfect, with both rails acting as the return part of the system in parallel electrical pick-up problems are substantially reduced.

While the system was generally confined to the larger gauges (O gauge and above) the Märklin company has for many years used a version of the system (known as the Märklin system) for their HO gauge range. Peco Products make studding for their 00/H0 track range. Part nos SL-17 for track and SL-18 for turnouts.

Modern use of the system is largely restricted to garden railways where it has the advantage of being compatible with unmodified live steam locomotives. While it is possible to insulate model live steam locomotives so that they can operate on two rail electrified track, it is difficult and trouble prone especially where the model is likely to come into contact with water.

== Non-railway applications ==
While the obvious use is on railway power collection, the system also has applications wherever electrical energy needs to be transferred from a static source to moving user, or vice versa.

== Systems ==
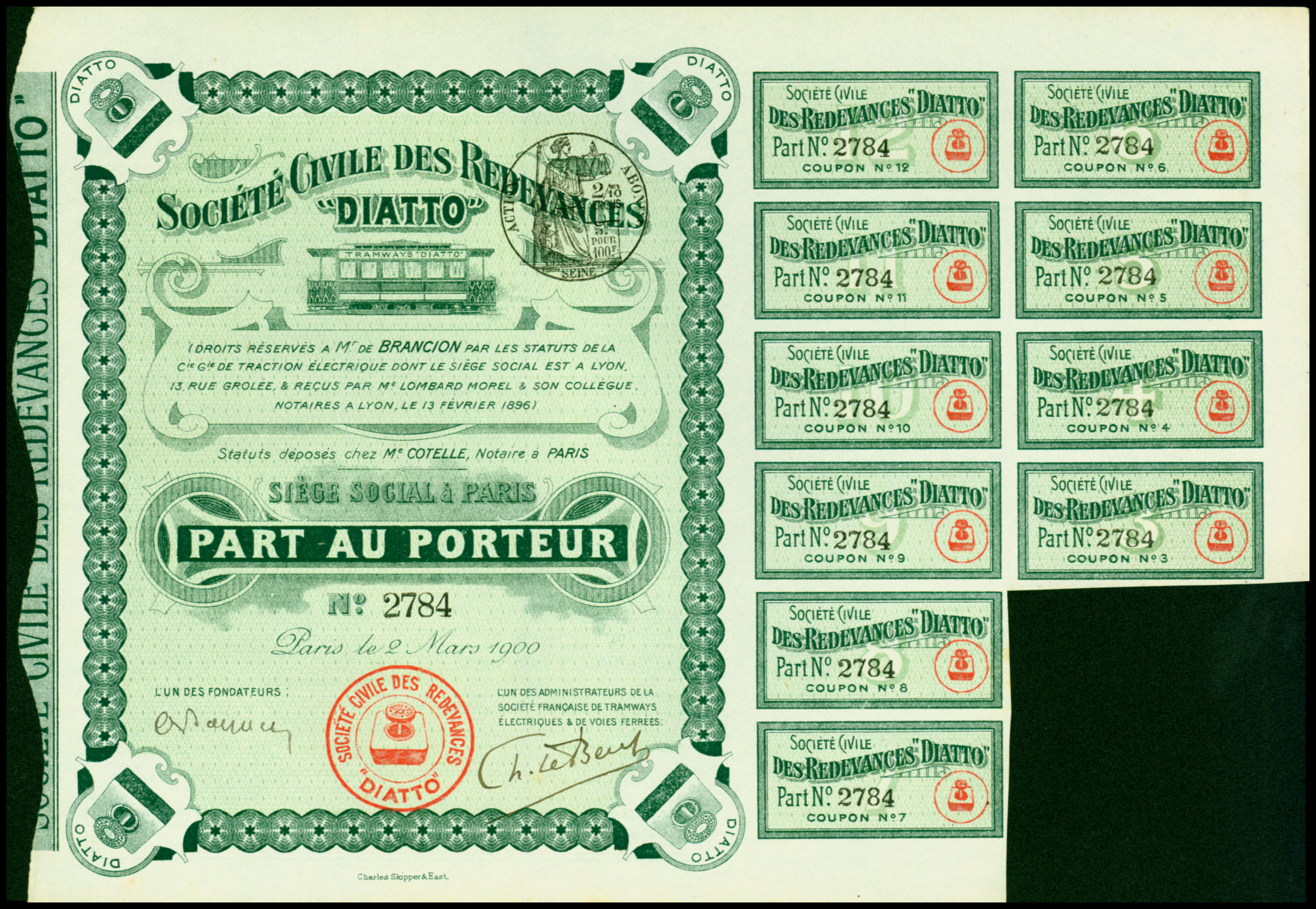
Share of the Soc. Civile des Redevances "Diatto", issued 2. March 1900 with illustrations of the Diatto studs

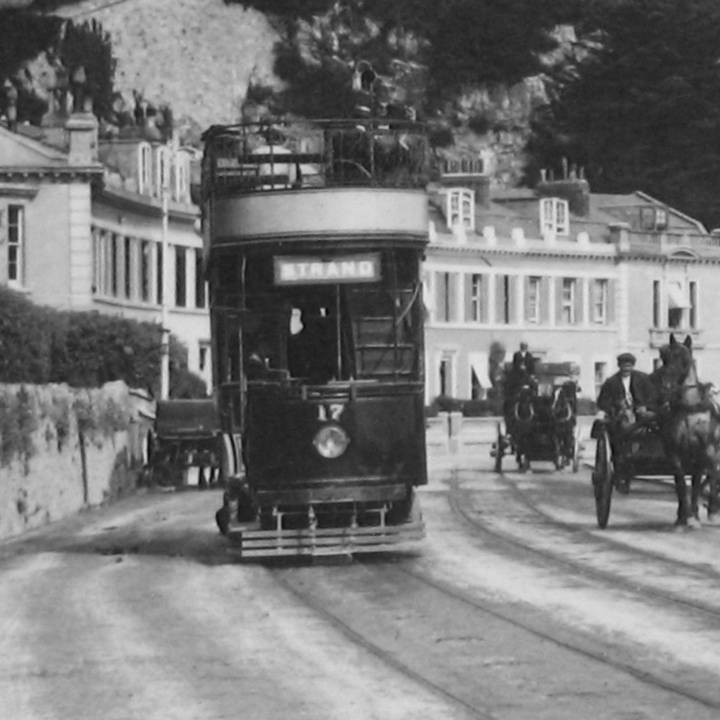
The Dolter stud system in use at Torquay from 1907 until 1911

=== Brown ===
The Brown Surface Contact System was manufactured by Lorain.

=== Diatto ===
The Diatto stud system was the most common in France, with over 20,000 studs in use. It was invented by an Italian, Alfredo Diatto of Turin and was first installed in Tours in 1899, followed by four of the Paris tramway companies in 1900.

=== Dolter ===
For the Dolter system a conductor cable was laid in a trench between the rails. At 9-foot (2.7 m) intervals a box was fitted between the rails that contained a stud (which protruded about 1 inch (25 mm) above the road) and a bell crank. A magnet on a passing tram attracted this crank which then moved to make contact between the conductor cable and stud; once the tram moved away the crank dropped away and the stud was no longer connected to the cable. A long skate was suspended beneath each tramcar which was magnetised by electro-magnets and so both operated the cranks and collected the current that both moved the tram car and powered the electro-magnets. A small battery was carried to charge the electro-magnets should the power be interrupted. The negative return current passed through the rails.

The town council of Torquay did not want their seaside resort disfigured by the poles and overhead wires of a conventional electric tramway and so invited the Dolter Electric Traction Company to construct a tramway using their stud-contact system. A horse was killed after it stepped on a live stud during construction of the Torquay Tramways. Each tram car was then fitted with a bell connected to a special contact arm to warn the driver if a stud remained live after it had passed. The conductor of the tram then had to reset the crank using an insulated mallet. During the Board of Trade inspection of the tramway four such studs were detected during about 8 miles (13 km) of tests. There were also frequent problems with trams being stopped when a stud failed to be made live when needed. The network covered 6.79 miles (10.93 km) and opened in stages during 1907 and 1908. On 27 January 1910 a snow storm stopped all the trams as they couldn't make contact with the studs. It was converted to overhead collection in 1911 shortly before it was extended to Paignton where the town council had refused to allow the Dolter system to be used.

A short Dolter system also opened in 1907 in Hastings along the seafront to connect two sections of a network that otherwise used overhead collection. It lasted until 1913. For the next eight years the trams that worked along Hastings sea front were fitted with a small motor to enable them to move between the two sections of overhead wire, but in 1921 wires were provided along the section.

The Mexborough & Swinton Tramway used the Dolter system from 1907 until 1908 when it was converted to overhead supply.

=== Griffiths-Bedell stud system ===
The Griffiths-Bedell stud system of the Lincoln Corporation Tramways.

== Users ==
=== United Kingdom ===
- Hastings and District Electric Tramways (Dolter)
- Lincoln Corporation Tramways (Griffiths-Bedell)
- Mexborough & Swinton Tramway (Dolter)
- Torquay Tramways (Dolter)
- Wolverhampton Corporation Tramways (Lorain) plus some vehicles from the Wolverhampton District Electric Tramways Company which operated on Wolverhampton Corporation tracks

=== France ===
- Lorient, Brittany, (Diatto)
- Paris, (Diatto)
- Tours, (Diatto)
- Bordeaux

== See also ==
- Conduit current collection
- Contact shoe
- Guide bar
- List of railway electrification systems
- Online Electric Vehicle
- Pantographs
- Third rail
