= Ground-level power supply =

System for powering electric vehicles

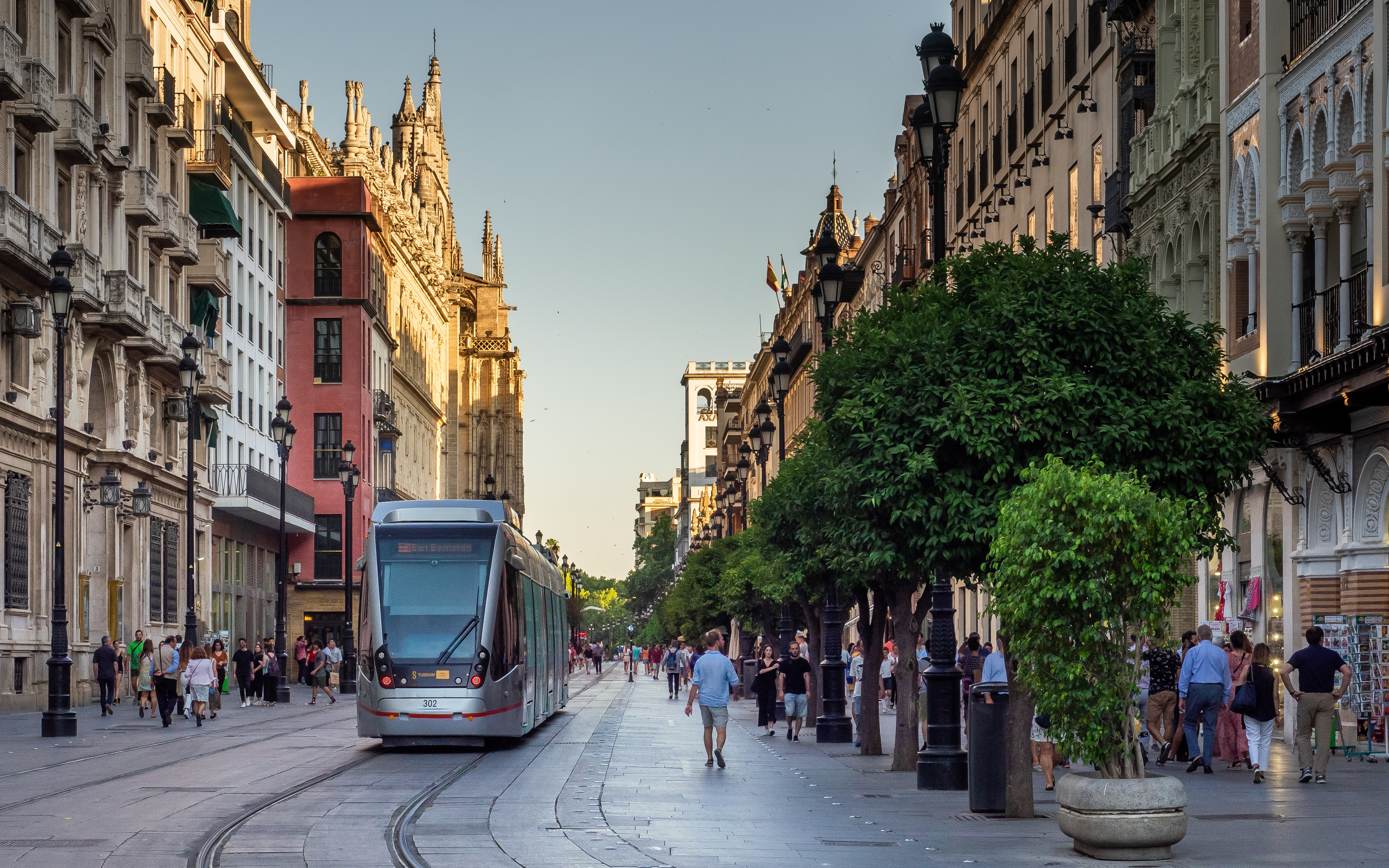
Seville Tram equipped with CAF ACR ground-level power supply, 2019

Ground-level power supply, also known as surface current collection or, in French, alimentation par le sol ("feeding via the ground"), is a concept and group of technologies that enable electric vehicles to collect electric power at ground level instead of the more common overhead lines.

Ground-level power supply systems date to the beginning of electric tramways. Often they were implemented where the public expressed an aesthetic desire to avoid overhead lines. Some of the earliest systems used conduit current collection. Systems in the 21st century, such as Alstom APS, Ansaldo Tramwave, CAF ACR, and Elways, were developed to modern standards of safety and reliability, and added the ability to supply power to electric buses, trucks, and cars.

Some ground-level power supply systems use efficient, energy-dense capacitors and batteries to power portions of an electric transit system—for example, enabling buses and trains to charge their batteries during station stops.

== Early systems ==
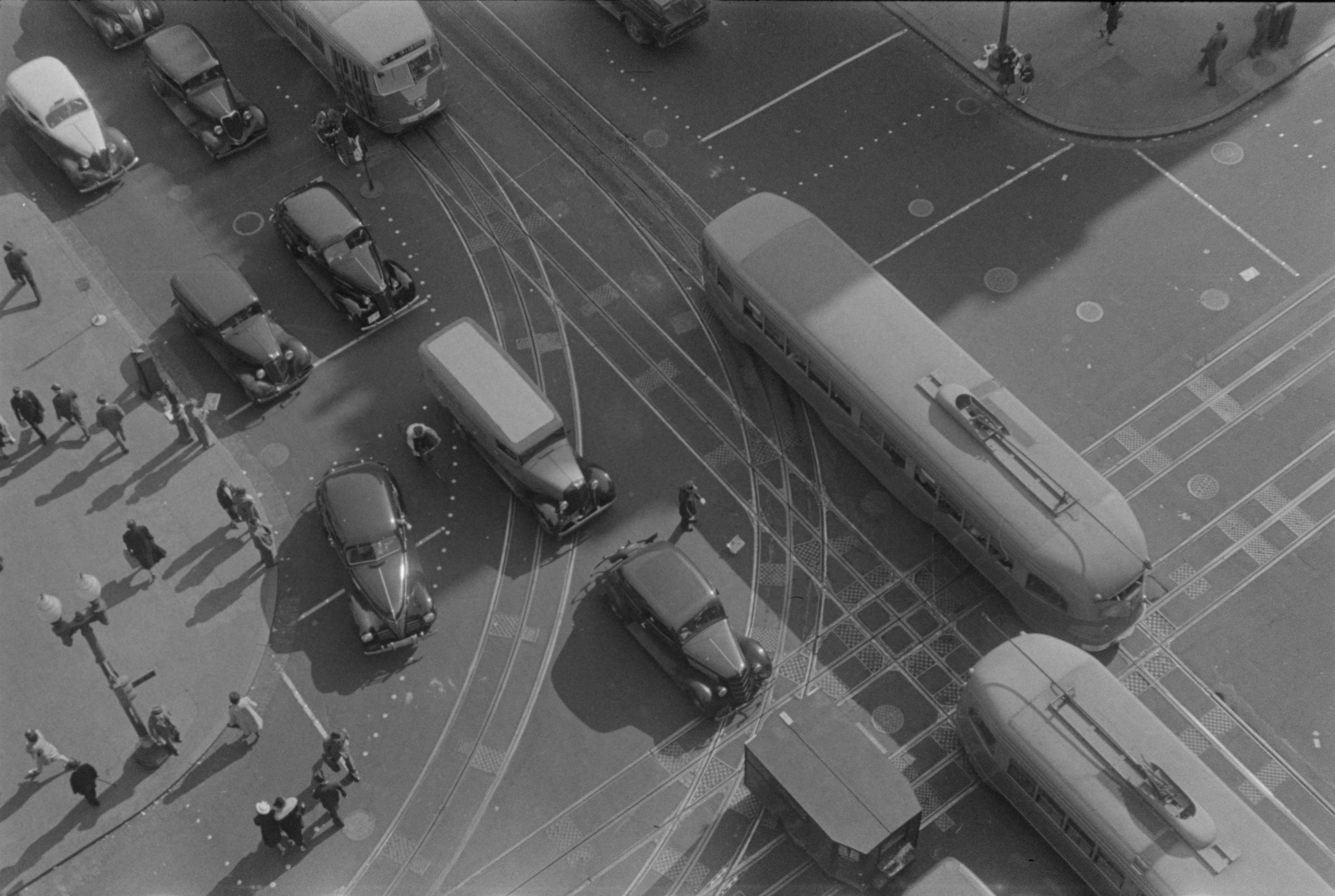
Conduit for current collection between the rails of streetcars in Washington, D.C., 1939. First installed in 1895, it remained in operation until 1962.

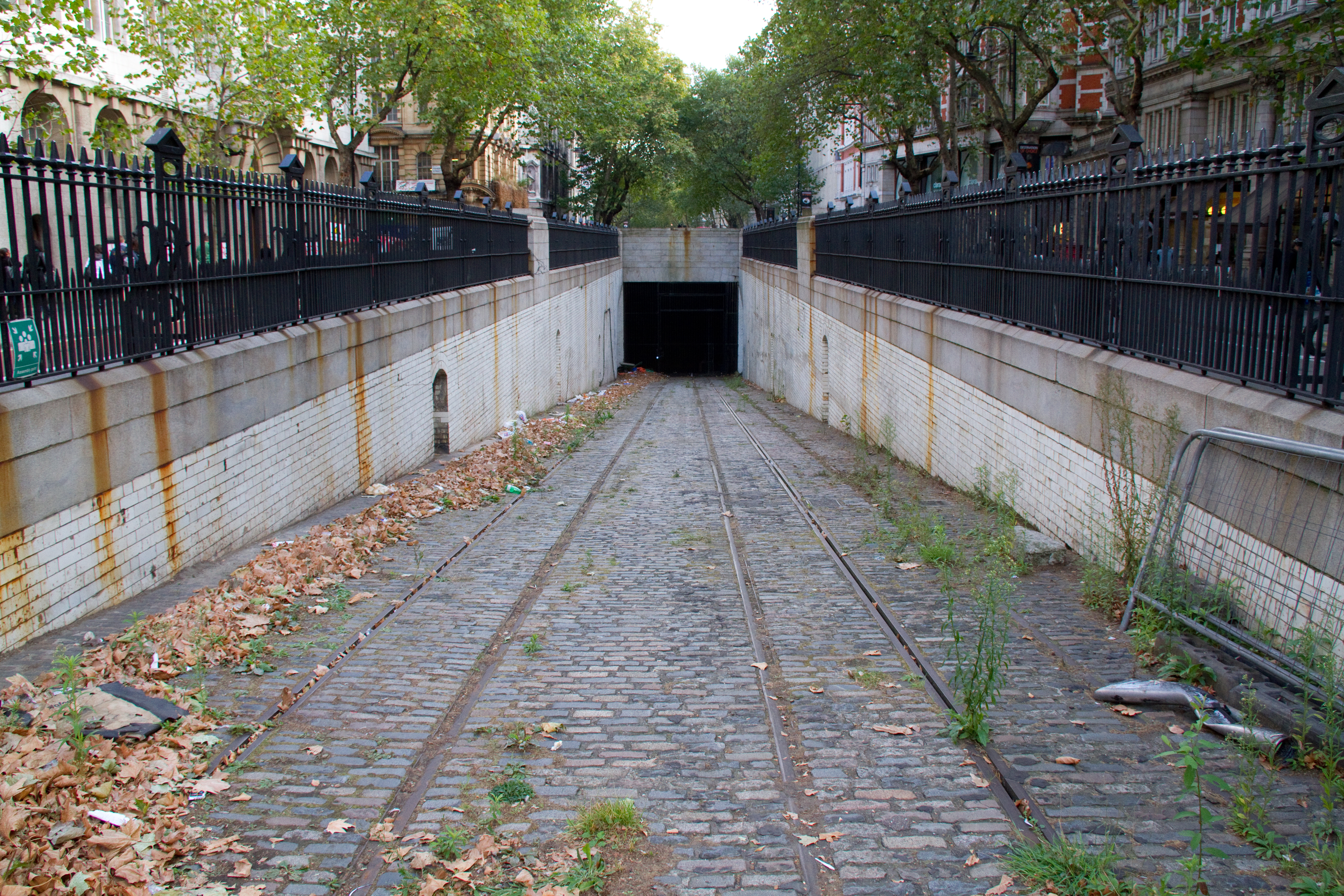
Remaining conduit tram track on the ramp to the abandoned Kingsway tram subway in London, 2011, with plants growing in the conduit

Conduit current collection systems were implemented as early as 1881 with the Gross-Lichterfelde Tramway. The system is primarily composed of a channel, or conduit, excavated under the roadway; the conduit is positioned either between the running rails, much in the same fashion as the cable for cable cars, or underneath one of the rails; a car is connected to a "plow" that runs through the conduit and delivers power from two electric rails at the sides of the conduit to the car's electric motor. Plows were manually attached and detached from cars as they switched rail lines.

Cleveland opened a conduit line in 1885. Tram companies in Budapest trialed a conduit current collector system in 1887. Overhead lines were met with public opposition for aesthetic reasons, so the contractor Siemens-Halske implemented a concrete conduit underneath one of the trolley rails, with a narrow opening that allowed a "plow" to be inserted and make electrical contact with wires held by insulators at either side of the conduit. The system was used in several cities in Europe and the United States, where it was known as the "Budapest System". Washington, D.C. installed its first conduit current collection system in 1895. By 1899 all downtown lines were converted to the conduit system, which remained in operation until 1962. The system was generally safe, but tended to get clogged by mud and dirt. The system fell out of favor within a few years due to the cost of excavating the conduit, and was generally replaced with overhead lines.

Stud contact systems were implemented from 1899 to 1921. Systems by the inventors Dolter and Diatto were used in Tours, Paris, and several towns in England. Power was supplied from studs set in the road at intervals, which connected to the traveling cars with contact shoes or contact skis. The studs were cylinders with their tops flush with the road surface. Underneath there was a switch mechanism that made an electrical connection with the top of the stud when a car with a strong electromagnet at its underside passed over it. The Diatto switches contained mercury, which often leaked or adhered to the side of the cylinder and kept the exposed top electrified. The Dolter switches used pivot arms, which tended to get stuck in the electrified position. Similar systems were operated by Thomson-Houston in Monaco from 1898 to 1903, and by František Křižík in Prague on the King Charles Bridge from 1903 to 1908. Stud contact systems were short-lived due to safety issues.

Conduit current collection systems were used in several major cities, including Monaco, Dresden, Prague, Tours, Washington, and London, but posed maintenance issues and road safety issues. The Bordeaux and Washington conduit systems remained the last in operation until being decommissioned in 1958 and 1962, respectively. For decades, these systems were not reintroduced because they didn't meet modern safety standards.

== Modern systems ==
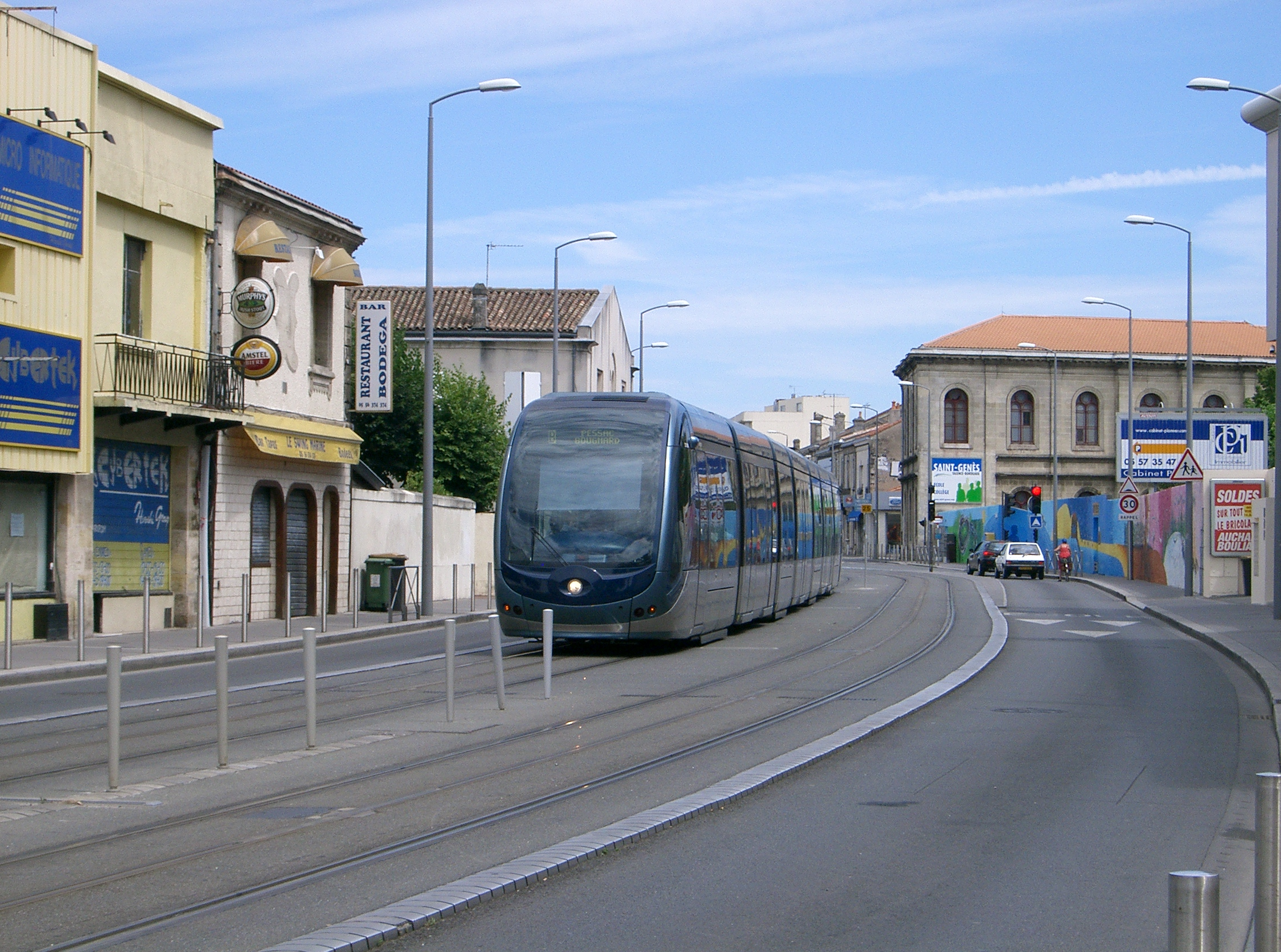
Bordeaux tramway equipped with Alstom APS ground-level power supply, 2006

A number of ground-level power supply systems were developed from the 1970s through the 1990s, but were not reliable or safe enough for commercial use.

The first ground-level power supply system developed to modern safety standards was the Ansaldo Stream, although a competing system, Alstom APS, was the first to be commercially implemented in 2003. This success led to a proliferation of commercial implementations of ground-level power supply systems.

Advancements in technology in the late 2010s led to ground-level power supplies seeing increasing reliability and economic feasibility.

=== Electric road systems ===
==== Sweden ====
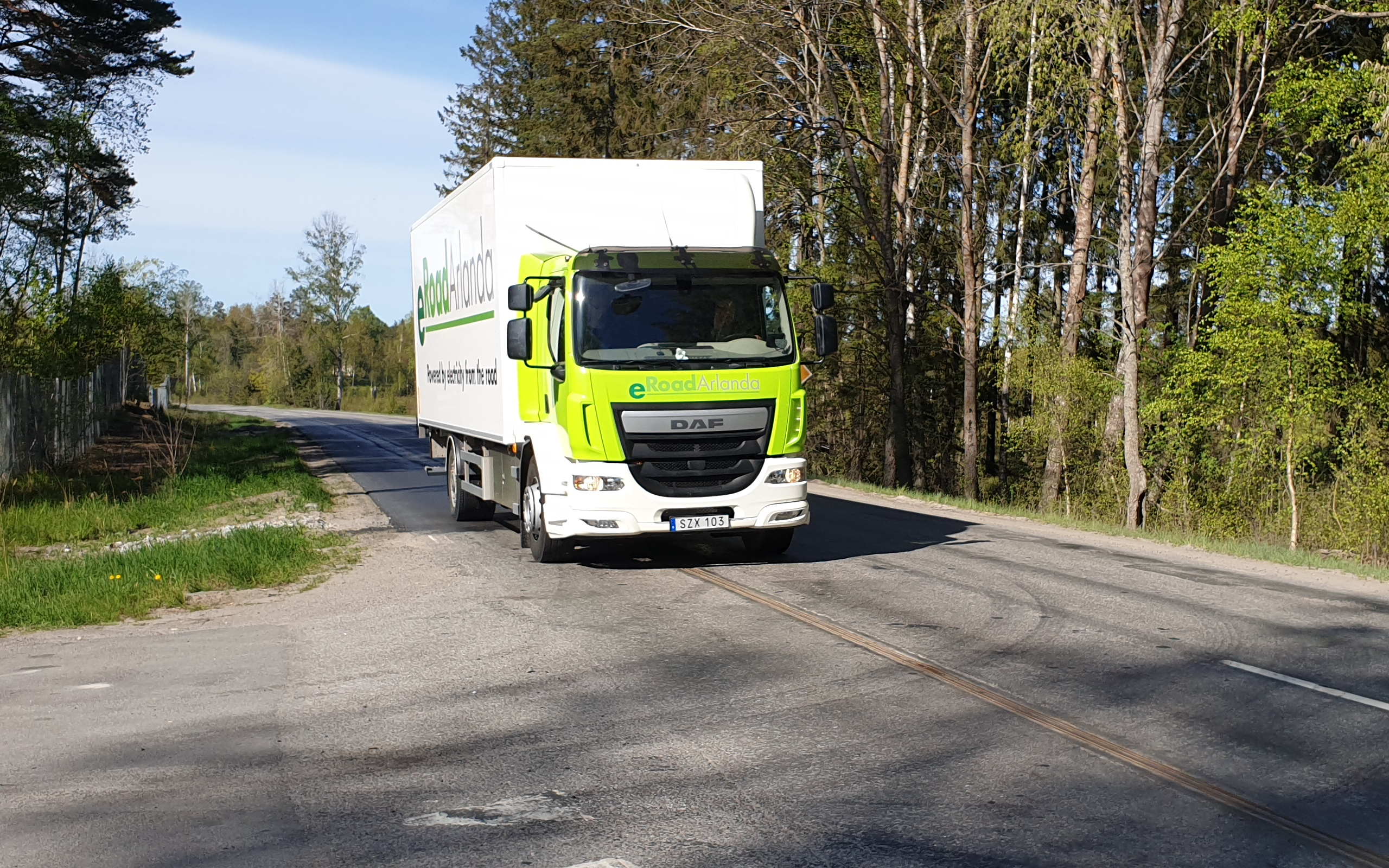
Electric truck driving on a public road with Elways-Evias ground-level power supply, near Stockholm Arlanda Airport, 2019

Electric roads power and charge electric vehicles while driving. Sweden has tested electric road systems that charge the batteries of trucks and electric cars, and among the tested systems are two ground-level power supply systems tested since 2017, in-road rail by Elways-Evias and on-road rail by Elonroad. Elonroad later developed an in-road rail system for highway use at speeds up to 130 kilometres per hour (81 mph). The systems were found to be more economical than the tested overhead line system and dynamic inductive charging system. The in-road rail system is planned to deliver up to 800 kW per vehicle traveling over a powered segment of the rail, and the system is estimated to be the most cost-effective among the four tested systems. The new systems are expected to be safe, with segments of the rail being powered only when a vehicle is traveling over them. The rails have been tested while submerged in salt water and were found to be safe for pedestrians.

==== France ====
The co-director for one of the French Ministry of Ecology working groups on electric road systems stated that rail-based ERS are the most advantageous, though the specific rail technology has yet to be standardized. France plans to invest 30 to 40 billion euro by 2035 in an electric road system spanning 8,800 kilometers. Ground-level power supply technologies are considered the most likely candidates for electric roads. Two projects for assessment of electric road technologies have been announced in 2023. The first French public road with an electric road system is planned to open in 2024 using a ground-level power supply system derived from Alstom APS. The second, with technology developed by Elonroad, is scheduled to undergo laboratory testing for skid effects on motorcycles before being deployed along two kilometers on the A10 autoroute south of Paris.

=== Standardization ===
Alstom, Elonroad, and other companies have, in 2020, begun drafting a standard for ground-level power supply electric roads. The European Commission published in 2021 a request for regulation and standardization of electric road systems. Shortly afterward, a working group of the French Ministry of Ecology recommended adopting a European electric road standard formulated with Sweden, Germany, Italy, the Netherlands, Spain, Poland, and others.

A standard for on-board electrical equipment for a vehicle powered by a rail electric road system (ERS) was approved and published in late 2022. The standard, CENELEC Technical Standard 50717, specifies the following: an ERS voltage of 750 volts; a contact shoe capable of withstanding impact of gravel and similar road debris at the maximum operating speed; a weak link that breaks off the current collector at the structural fixing points if the force is larger than the maximum specified by the vehicle manufacturer; automatic monitoring of the presence of ERS infrastructure; automatic engagement and disengagement; a presence signal that may be analog or digital, and optional standard bidirectional communication; ease of inspection and replacement for the wearing parts of the sliding contact; and standard tests, markings, maintenance, and operational environment conditions. The 50717 standard does not encompass infrastructure architectures, but specifies three: Type A architecture with two parallel surface-level conductive rails, one positive and one negative; Type B architecture with a single surface-level or raised track with short segments where each two segments in series consist of one positive and one negative segment; and Type C architecture with three parallel conductive rails, one positive and one negative below surface level in 1.5 cm wide channels, and one or more rails earthed at surface level.

A complete power and communication standard for a unified and interoperable solution for ground-level power supply through embedded rails for road vehicles in accordance with European Union directive 2023/1804 is specified in CENELEC technical standard 50740. The standard was approved in 2025.

== Modern implementations ==
=== Ansaldo Stream ===
The first modern ground-level power supply system to be developed is the Ansaldo Stream system. STREAM is an acronym that stands for "Sistema di TRasporto Elettrico ad Attrazione Magnetica", meaning "System of Electric Transport by Magnetic Attraction". The system uses a channel in the road made of insulating composite fiberglass material which contains a flexible copper strip; a vehicle passing over the channel with a special magnetic contact shoe raises the conductor to the surface, allowing power to flow to the vehicle. Segments of the strip are powered only when a vehicle passes over them. The system was developed in 1994 and trialed on a public tram line in 1998, which was eventually dismantled in 2012.

=== Alstom APS ===
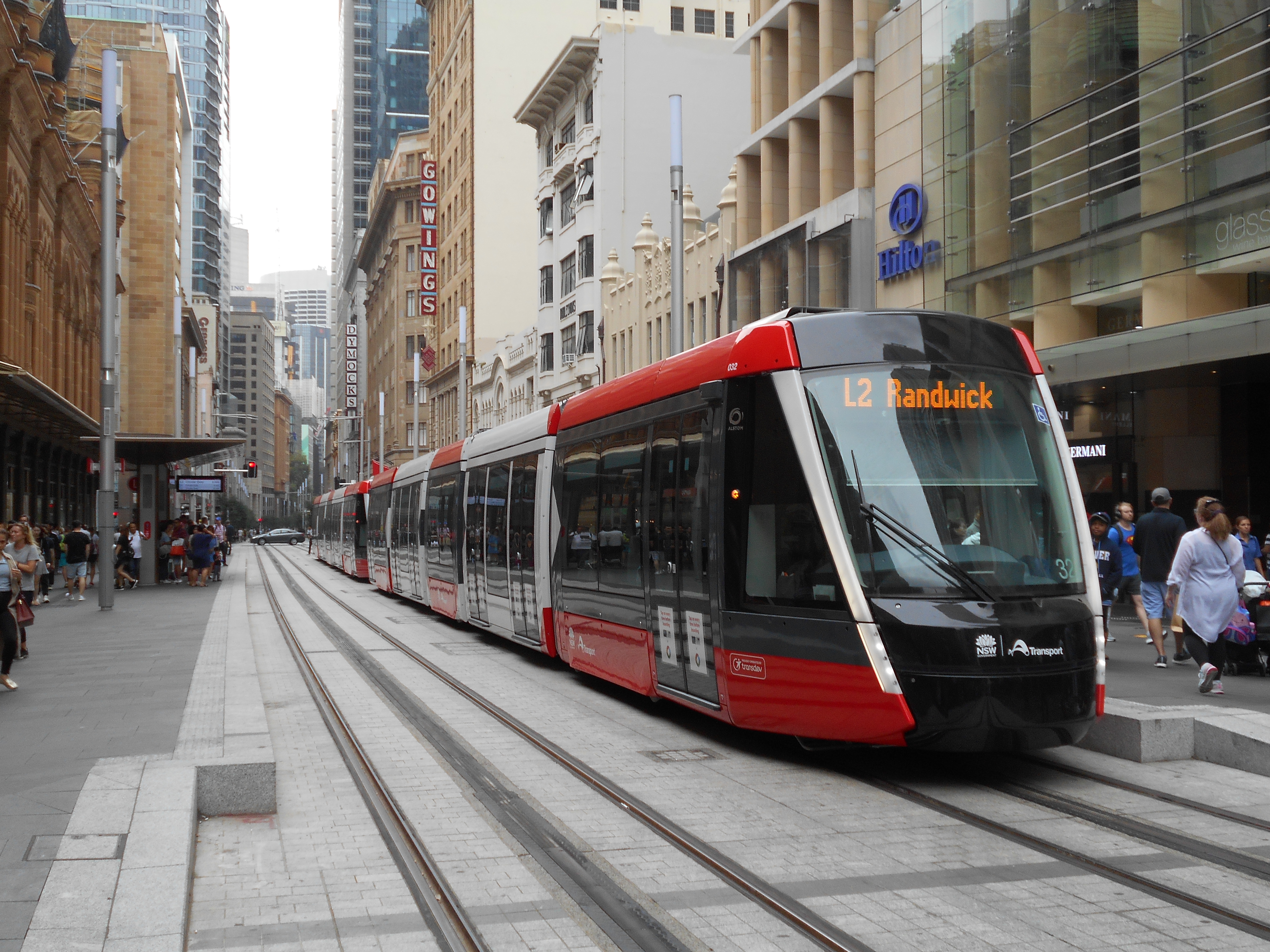
Light rail at the Queen Victoria Building, Sydney in 2019. Vehicles and pedestrians may safely move across the electrified rail because segments are powered only when there is a compatible vehicle covering them.

Alstom APS uses a third rail placed between the running rails, divided electrically into 11-metre segments. These segments automatically switch on by radio control only when a tram is passing over them, thereby avoiding any risk to other road users. The tram has two collector shoes, and two segments of rail are active at any given time, to avoid interruption of power when passing between segments.

APS was developed by Innorail, a Spie Enertrans subsidiary acquired by Alstom. It was created for the Bordeaux tramway, which was built from 2000 to 2003. Since 2011, other cities have used the technology. The French government reports no electrocutions or electrification accidents on any tramway in France from 2003 through 2022.

Alstom is modifying the APS system for use by electric road vehicles, such as buses, trucks, utility vehicles, and cars. The system is expected to supply 500kW to vehicles moving at up to 90 kilometres per hour (56 mph). As of 2024, the system had been tested for safety when the road is cleared by snowplows, under exposure to snow, ice, salting, and saturated brine, and for skid and road adherence safety for vehicles, including motorcycles. In 2023, Alstom said it would test the system on the RN205 public road in the Rhône-Alpes region between 2024 and 2027.

=== CAF ACR ===
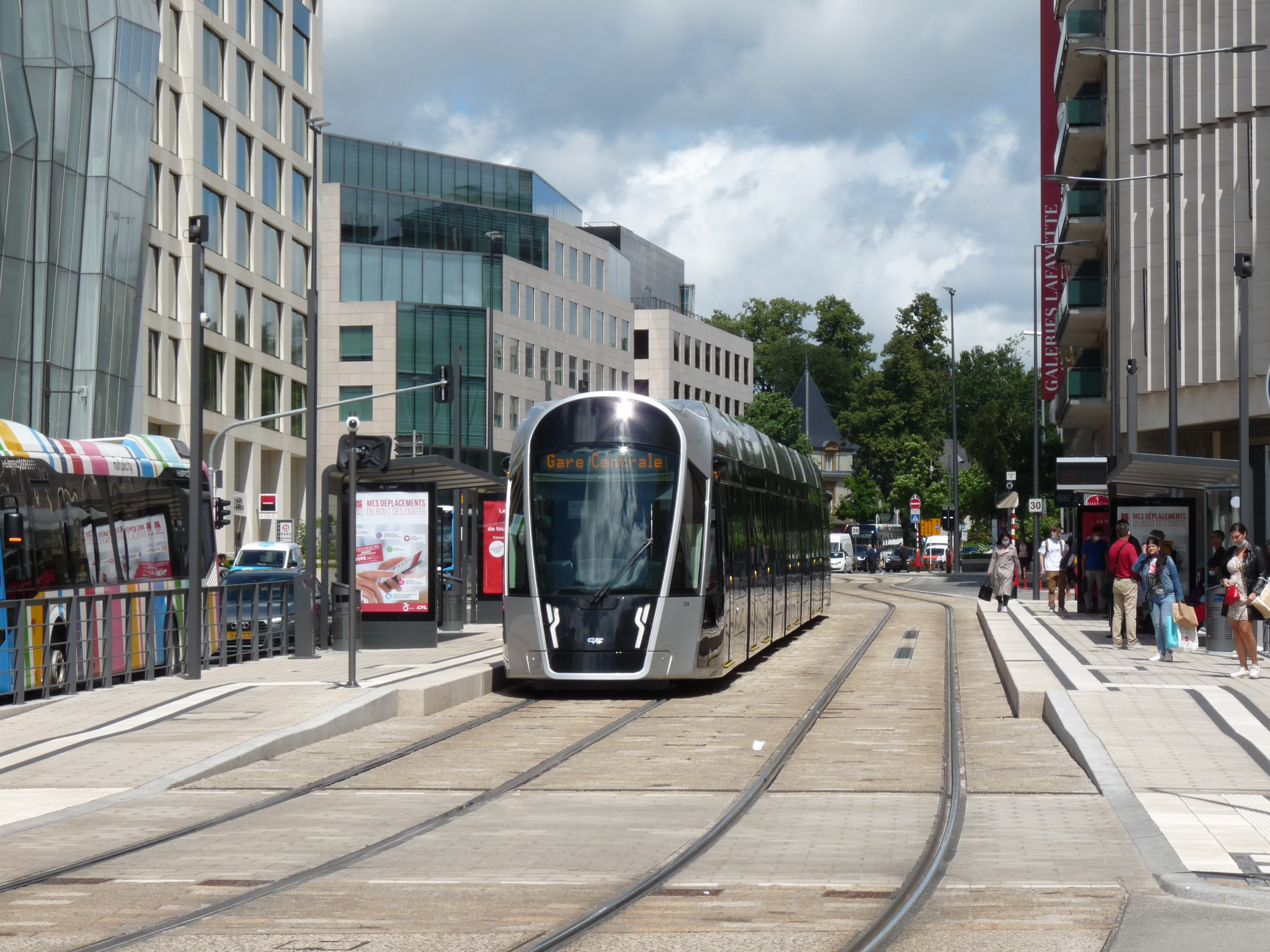
CAF ACR tram, Luxemburg, 2021. The tram is powered between stations by supercapacitors charged from the two metal strips between the rails at station stops.

Construcciones y Auxiliar de Ferrocarriles (CAF) trialed its Acumulador de Carga Rápida (ACR) system in 2007 in Seville. The system is capable of charging from strips on the ground or from overhead wires. Sections of the Seville MetroCentro tramway around the Seville Cathedral were converted to the ACR ground-level power supply system. ACR's first commercial installation was aboard Urbos trams supplied to MetroCentro in 2011, allowing the permanent removal of overhead lines around the cathedral.

Line 1 of the Tranvía de Zaragoza has also used ACR since its second construction phase was completed in 2013. The use of ACR avoided the installation of overhead lines in the city's historic centre.

ACR was included in the Newcastle Light Rail in Australia and Luxembourg's new tram system.

=== Ansaldo Tramwave ===
Derived from Ansaldo Stream and developed by Italian company Ansaldo STS (which later became Hitachi Rail STS), the Ansaldo TramWave ground-level power supply system successfully entered commercial application in 2017, with the opening of Zhuhai tram Line 1 first phase in China. The tram is the first fully low-floor tram system adopting ground level power supply technology. Later in 2017, Western Suburb Line in Beijing was opened with the same technology from Ansaldo. The technology has been licensed to CRRC Dalian and all the technologies were transferred to China. In 2019, Zhuhai City evaluated whether to dismantle the tram line, after 3 years of operation. As of 2024, CRRC Dalian opposes dismantling, proposing to restart operation.
