= Conduit current collection =

Obsolete method to power streetcars

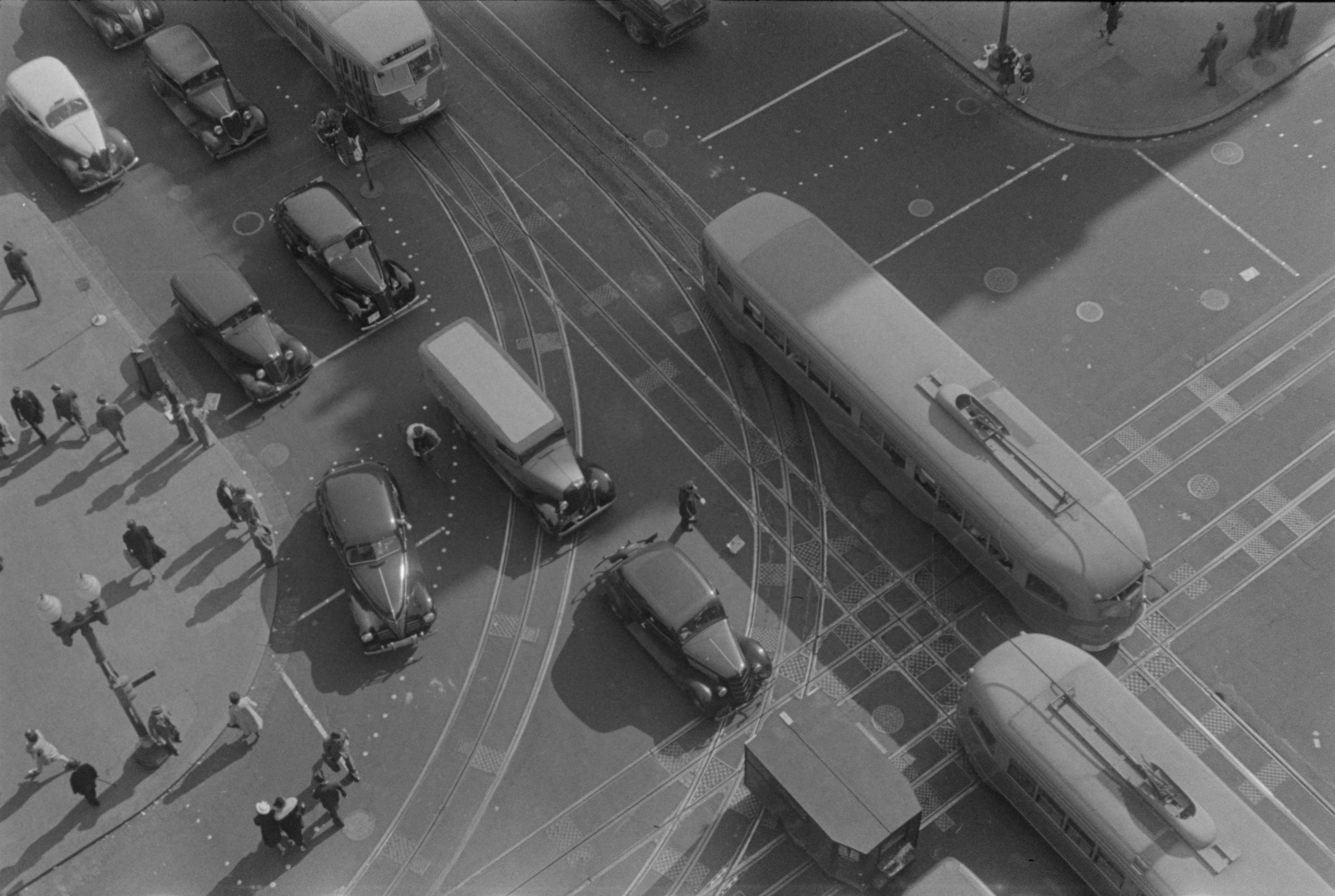
Conduit for current collection between the rails of streetcars in Washington, D.C., 1939. Washington installed the system in 1895 and it remained in operation until 1962

Conduit current collection is an obsolete system that was used by some electric tramways to pass current to streetcars via a "conduit", a small tunnel under the roadway. Modern systems fall under the term ground-level power supply.

The system is primarily composed of a channel, or conduit, excavated under the roadway; the conduit is positioned either between the running rails, much in the same fashion as the cable for cable cars, or underneath one of the rails; a car is connected to a "plow" or "plough" that runs through the conduit and delivers power from two electric rails at the sides of the conduit to the car's electric motor. Plows were manually attached and detached from cars as they switched rail lines.

Conduit current collection systems proved to be much more expensive, complicated, and trouble-prone than overhead wires. When electric street railways became ubiquitous, conduits were only used in those cities that did not permit overhead wires, including London, Paris, Berlin, Marseille, Vienna, Budapest, Prague, Manhattan, and Washington, D.C.. The Bordeaux and Washington conduit systems remained the last in operation until being decommissioned in 1958 and 1962, respectively.

For decades, "catenary-free" systems such as conduit current collection were not reintroduced because they didn't meet modern safety standards. Modern systems, called ground-level power supply, use a segmented rail flush with the surface of the road instead of a conduit, and the rail segments are only powered when an appropriate vehicle is over them. Alstom APS was the first modern commercial ground-level power supply system, first installed commercially in Bordeaux. The French government reports no electrocutions or electrification accidents on any tramway in France from as early as 2003 until as recently as December 31, 2021.

== Installations ==
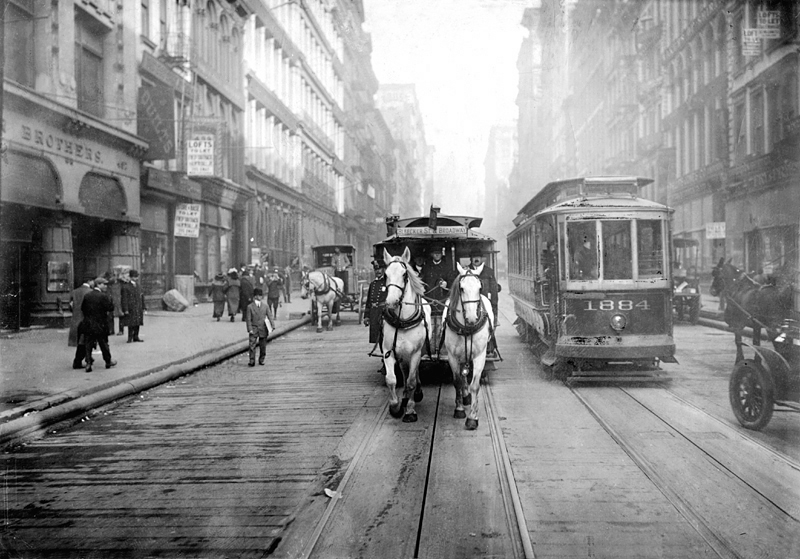
Horse power giving way to conduit power in New York

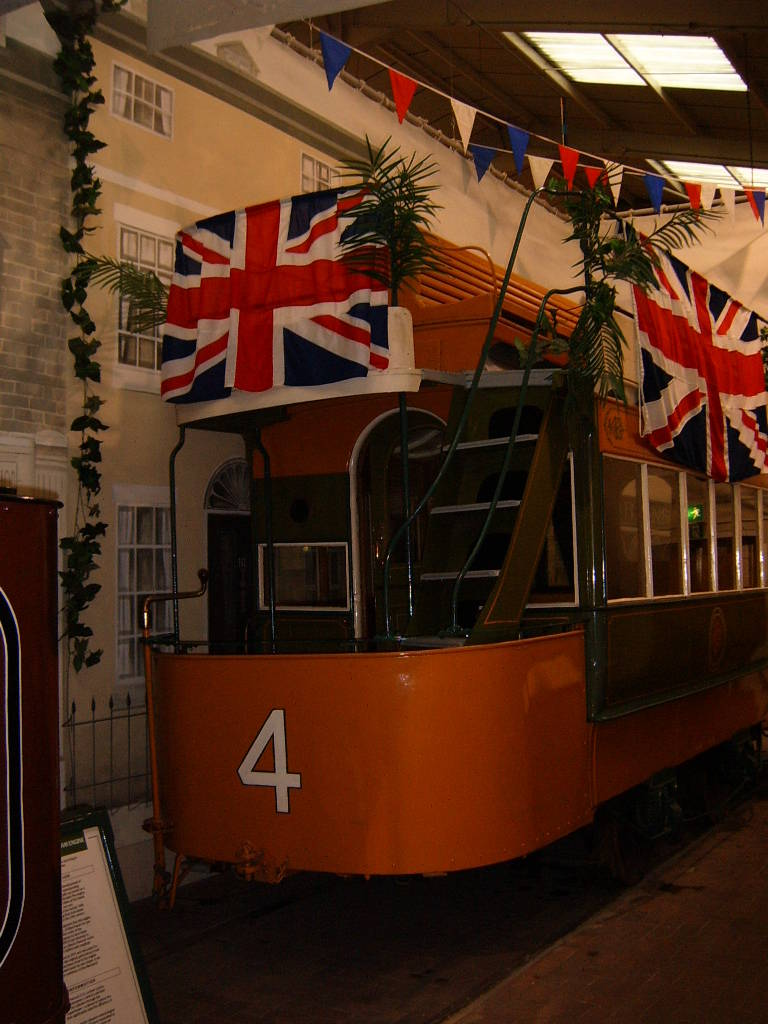
Conduit tramcar 4 from Blackpool, on display at the National Tramway Museum

In 1885, Blackpool was one of the first places to use conduit current collection. In the same year, Denver, Colorado, the world's second electric street railway, also installed it. The bulky system was replaced three years later.

Also in 1885, a conduit system was used on Britain's first electric tramway in the seaside resort of Blackpool. The conduit was replaced with overhead electrification, as sand and saltwater entered the it and caused breakdowns, and there was a problem with voltage drop. However the line survives to this day as part of the Blackpool tramway, and some sections of track still had the conduit slot visible until refurbishment in 2012. Car 4 of the original conduit line also still survives, and is preserved at the National Tramway Museum in Crich, Derbyshire.

New York City had the largest installation of conduit cars, due to the prohibition of overhead wires on Manhattan Island, although a few Bronx-based trolley lines entered the northern reaches of Manhattan using overhead wire. Trolley lines from Brooklyn and Queens also entered Manhattan under wire, but did not use city streets. The primary reason for the initial adoption of conduit systems was for aesthetic reasons as an alternative to overhead wiring that was often objected to as being unsightly.

The expense of creating conduit lines in New York was reduced where it was possible to convert the cable vaults from discontinued cable car lines. The huge cost of building new conduits gave New York the distinction of having one of the country's last horsecar lines: the Bleecker Street Line, which operated until 1917.

In some old photographs, two "slots" may be seen between the rails. In New York City, sometimes one slot was used for a cable line and the other for electric cars. Occasionally, two competing lines shared a common track and had independent slots for the ploughs of the respective cars. In London, two slots were sometimes used on a single-track stretch in a narrow road so that cars in each direction used separate conduits. Known as twin-conduit track, examples were found in York Road, Wandsworth and London Street, Greenwich.

In New York City, the Queensboro Bridge between Manhattan and Queens had tracks installed on the outer lanes with conduits for Manhattan cars in addition to overhead wires. The conduit allowed them to run to Queens Plaza terminus without need for removing the plough and raising the poles. In later years the conduit was removed and only trolley wire remained.

In London, the London County Council Tramways experimented with side conduit, where the conduit was in one of the side rails. This was tried along Kingsland Road between Bentley Road and Basing Place, Hoxton, but the stresses and strains of the weight of the cars weakened the conduit, so it was not tried elsewhere.

In the centre of Brussels some tram lines were fitted with conduits, the last ones being converted to overhead operation during World War II.

=== Hybrid installations ===
Washington, D.C., had a large network of conduit lines to avoid wires, as required by an 1889 law. Some lines used overhead wires when they approached rural or suburban areas. The last such line ran to Cabin John, Maryland. The current collector "plow" was mounted underneath the car on a fitting just forward of the rear truck on PCC streetcars. It had two cables with female connectors on cables to attach to matching cables of the car's electrical system. A "plowman" was assigned at each changeover point from overhead trolley wire to conduit to remove the cable attachments to the car and stow the plow, which did not remain with the car and was reattached in an incoming car running on overhead wire. The lower section of the plow "board" was drawn by the moving car within the cavity of the conduit. Because of this usage, many of Washington's streetcars carried trolley poles, which were lowered while operating in the central part of the city; when the cars reached a point where they switched to overhead operation, they stopped over a plow pit where the conduit plows were detached and the trolley poles raised, the reverse operation taking place on inbound runs. The 'pit' here has the meaning analogous to racing circuit pits rather than a depression in the road.

In the UK, London had a hybrid network of double-deck trams: overhead collection was used in the outer sections and conduit in the centre. At the changeover from conduit to overhead wire, at a change pit, the process was largely automatic. The conductor put the trolley pole onto the wire, and as the tram moved forward the conduit channel veered sideways to outside the running track, automatically ejecting the plough - the tram was said to be 'shooting the plough'. At the changeover from overhead wire to conduit the process was a little more complicated. The tram pulled up alongside a ploughman, who engaged a two-pronged plough fork over the plough in a short length of unelectrified conduit and into the plough channel underneath the centre of the tram. As the tram drew forward, the conduit channel moved under the tram, carrying the plough into position. The conductor pulled down the trolley pole and stowed it. The ploughman's job was a fairly skilled one because, if he failed to locate the plough fork correctly, it or the plough could jam in the plough channel and cause lengthy delays. Some tram designs required an extra carrier to be located with the plough and these frequently caused problems for ploughmen not used to the design (particularly if the tram had been diverted from its normal route).

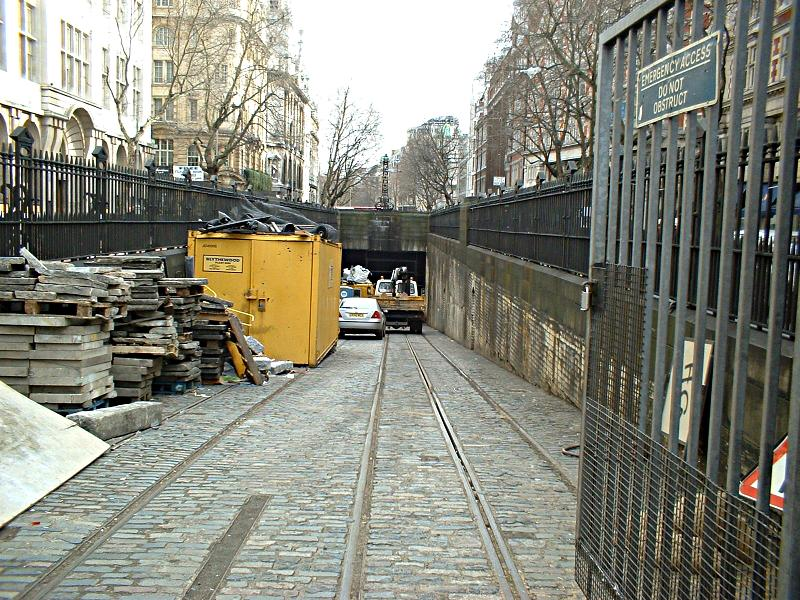
Abandoned conduit trackage at the Kingsway Tramway Subway in London

New conduit track was laid in 1951 for the Festival of Britain, which commemorated the Great Exhibition of 1851. The last tram was withdrawn in June 1952 and virtually all the tracks had been removed by the 1970s, although a short section can still be seen at the entrance to the former Kingsway Tramway Subway.

== See also ==
- Current collector
- Ground-level power supply
- Online Electric Vehicle
- Railway electrification system
- Third rail
- Tramway tracks
