= Guided track system =

A Guided track system may refer to:

- Maglev
- Rail tracks
- Tramway tracks
