= Tramway track =

Rail and components for trams or light rail vehicles

Tramway track is used on tramways or light rail operations. As with standard rail tracks, tram tracks have two parallel steel rails, the distance between the heads of the rails being the track gauge. When there is no need for pedestrians or road vehicles to traverse the track, conventional flat-bottom rail is used. However, when such traffic exists, such as in urban streets, grooved rails are used.

Tram rails can be placed on several surfaces, such as on ground over which track ballast topped by sleepers (US: ties) and flat-bottom rails are laid – as with railway tracks – or, for street running, with grooved rails usually embedded into a concrete pavement. In some places, tracks are laid into grass turf surfaces; they are known as green track, grassed track or track in lawn.

== History ==
Tramway tracks have existed since the mid-16th century. They were made of wood, but during the late 18th century, iron and later steel came into use and then predominated.

The first street tramways were laid in 1832 in New York by John Stephenson to assist horses pulling buses on dirt roads, especially when the roads were muddy from wet weather. The rails enabled a horse to easily pull a load of 10 tonnes compared to 1 tonne on a dirt road. The evolution of street tramway tracks paralleled the transition from horse power to mechanical and electric power. On a dirt road, the rails needed a foundation, usually a mass concrete raft. Highway authorities often made tramway companies pave the rest of the road, usually with granite or similar stone blocks, at extra cost.

The first tramways had a rail projecting above the road surface, or a step set into the road, both of which were apt to catch the narrow tyres of horse-drawn carriages. The invention by Alphonse Loubat in 1852 of grooved rail enabled tramways to be laid without causing a nuisance to other road users, except unsuspecting cyclists, who could get their wheels caught in the groove.

== Grooved rail ==
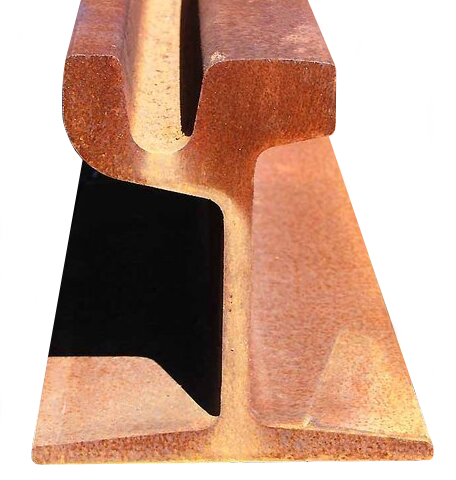
Grooved rail, used when track is laid in places traversed by other vehicles or pedestrians

A grooved rail, groove rail, or girder rail is a special rail with a groove designed for tramway or railway track in pavement or grassed surfaces (grassed track or track in a lawn). The head on the right-hand side of the rail bears the vehicle's weight. The guard on the left-hand side, which has ample room for wheel flanges, carries no weight but serves to minimize the chance of derailment if the wheel were to be deflected from its normal position, in which the flange is not laterally constrained.

The grooved rail was invented in 1852 by Alphonse Loubat, a French inventor who improved tram and rail equipment and helped develop tram lines in New York City and Paris. The invention of grooved rail enabled tramways to be laid without causing a nuisance to other road users, except unsuspecting cyclists, who could get their wheels caught in the groove. The grooves may become filled with gravel and dirt (particularly if infrequently used or after a period of idleness) and need to be cleared from time to time, this being done by a "scrubber" tram. Failure to clear the grooves can lead to a bumpy ride for passengers, damage to either the wheel or the rail, and possibly derailment.

In response to the variety of tramway rail designs in use in the UK, and the need for suitable rails for electric traction (which was rapidly replacing horse-drawn trams), a sub-committee of the Engineering Standards Committee was created, which produced a British Standard design for grooved rails (and fishplates) for tramways in 1903 (BS 2:1903). In the standard, the same design can be specified in 5 different weights, from 90 pounds (lb) per yard to 110lb per yard in 5lb steps. Each section also had a variation for curved sections, with a slightly wider groove.

=== Girder guard rail ===
The traditional form of grooved rail is the girder guard section illustrated below. This rail is a modified form of flanged rail and requires special mounting to transfer weight and stabilise the gauge. If the roadway subsurface carries the weight, steel ties are needed at regular intervals to maintain the gauge. Installing these requires excavating and reinstating the entire surface.

=== Block rail ===
Block rail is a lower-profile form of girder guardrail in which the web is eliminated. In profile, it is more like a solid form of bridge rail with a flangeway and guard added. Simply removing the web and combining the head section directly with the foot section would result in a weak rail, so additional thickness is required in the combined section.

=== Prefabricated grooved rail ===
A modern version of the grooved block rail has a lower mass. It is inserted into a prefabricated spanning concrete girder, such as the LR55 without a web but fully supported by noise-reducing polyurethane grout, or a girder rail such as P-CAT City Metro is embedded. The prefabricated units, if used with ultra-light trams, can be embedded into the existing road base, possibly reducing the need for underground service diversions.

== Electrification ==
Electrification needed other developments, most notably heavier rails to cope with electric tramcars weighing 12 tonnes rather than the 4 tonne horse-drawn variety; switching points, as electric trams could not be pulled onto the correct track by horses; and the need for electrical connections, to provide the return path for the electric current, which was usually supplied through an overhead wire.

=== Conduit and stud systems ===
In some cities where overhead electric cables were deemed intrusive, underground conduits with electrical conductors were used. Examples of this were New York, Washington, D.C., Paris, London, Brussels, and Budapest. The electrical power conduit system was very expensive to install and maintain, although Washington did not close until 1962. Attempts were made with alternative systems that did not require overhead wires. There were many systems of "surface" contact, in which studs were set into the road surface and energised by a passing tram, either mechanically or magnetically, to supply power through a skate carried under the tram. Unfortunately, these systems all failed due to the problem of reliability and not always turning off after the tram had passed, resulting in the occasional electrocution of horses and dogs. Since 2003, a new system of surface contact has been installed in the Bordeaux tramway by Alstom.

== Cable haulage ==
Before the universal introduction of electric power, many tramways were cable hauled, with a continuous cable carried in a conduit under the road, and with a slot in the road surface through which the tram could clasp the cable for motion. This system can still be seen in San Francisco in California, as well as the system of the Great Orme in Wales. These needed a rather more substantial track formation.

== Gallery ==
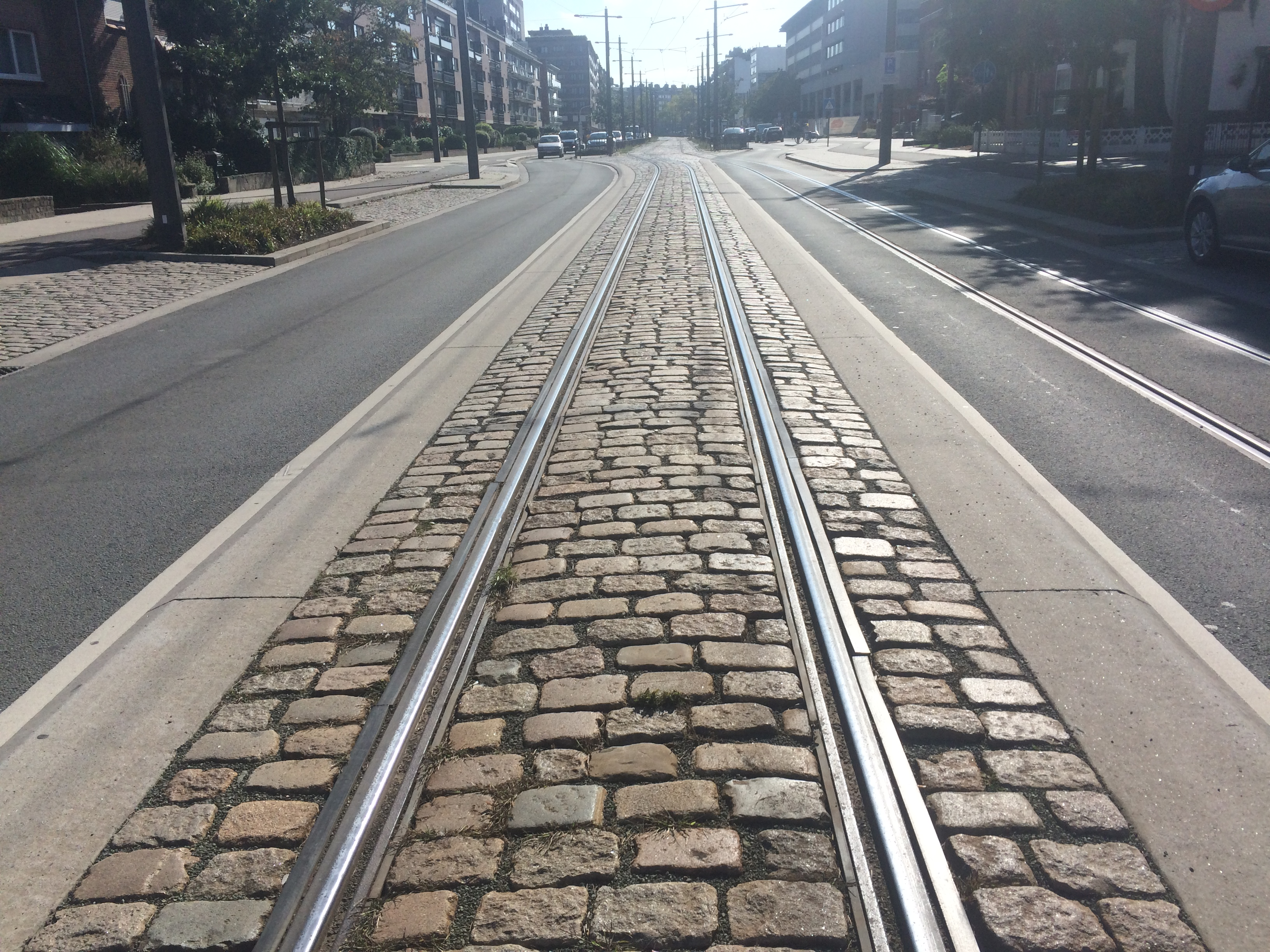
Tram track on Florent Pauwelslei, Antwerp

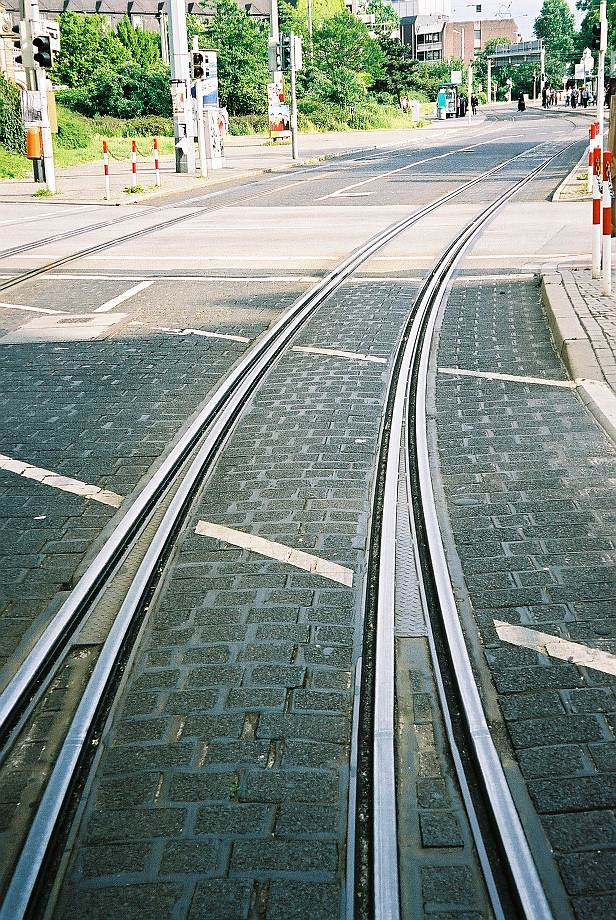
Grooved-rail gauntlet track

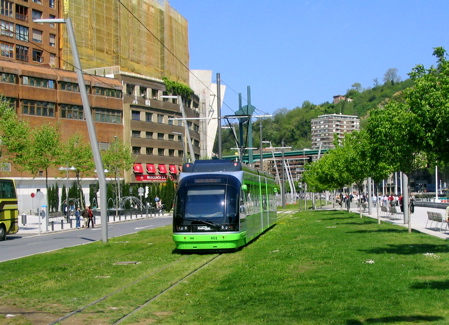
Grassed track

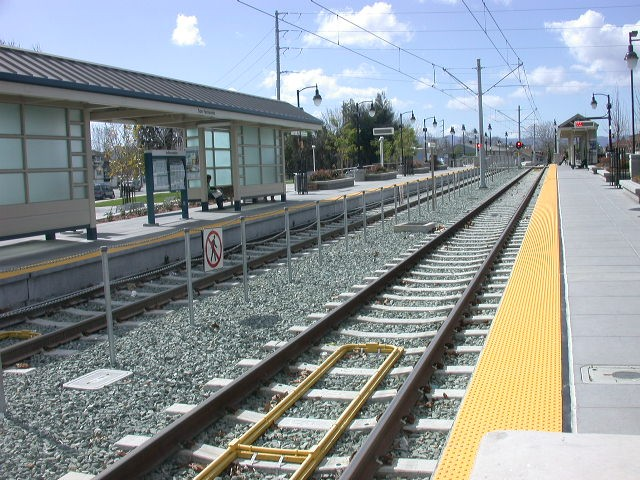
Light rail tracks with concrete railroad ties (sleepers)

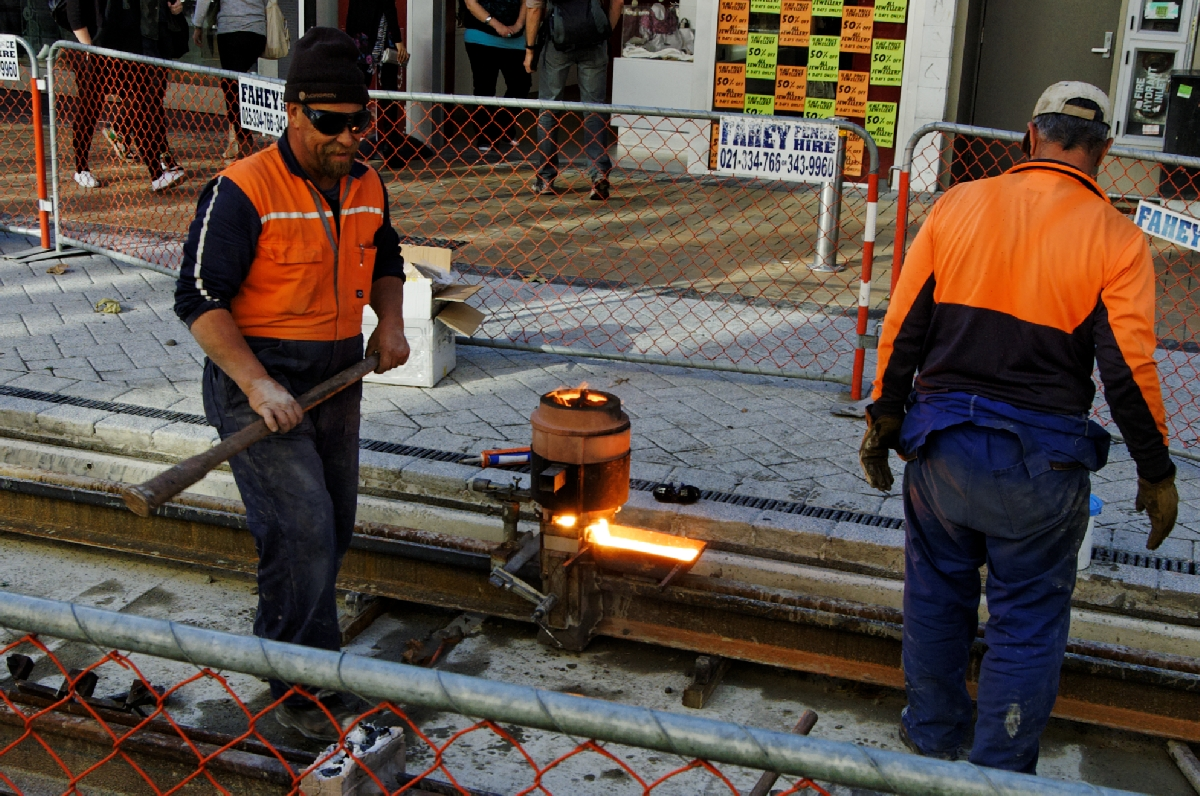
Joining tram tracks using an exothermic weld

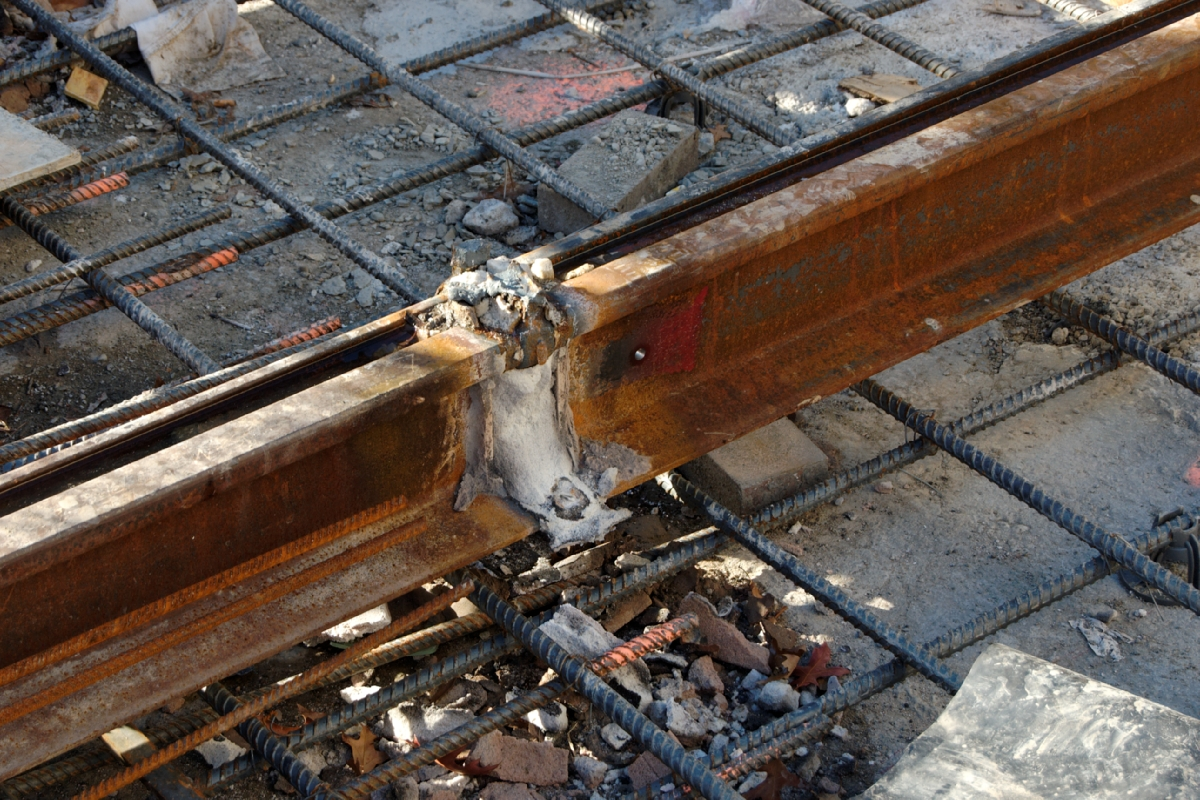
A rough exothermic weld after removal of the mould recently, before grinding to profile

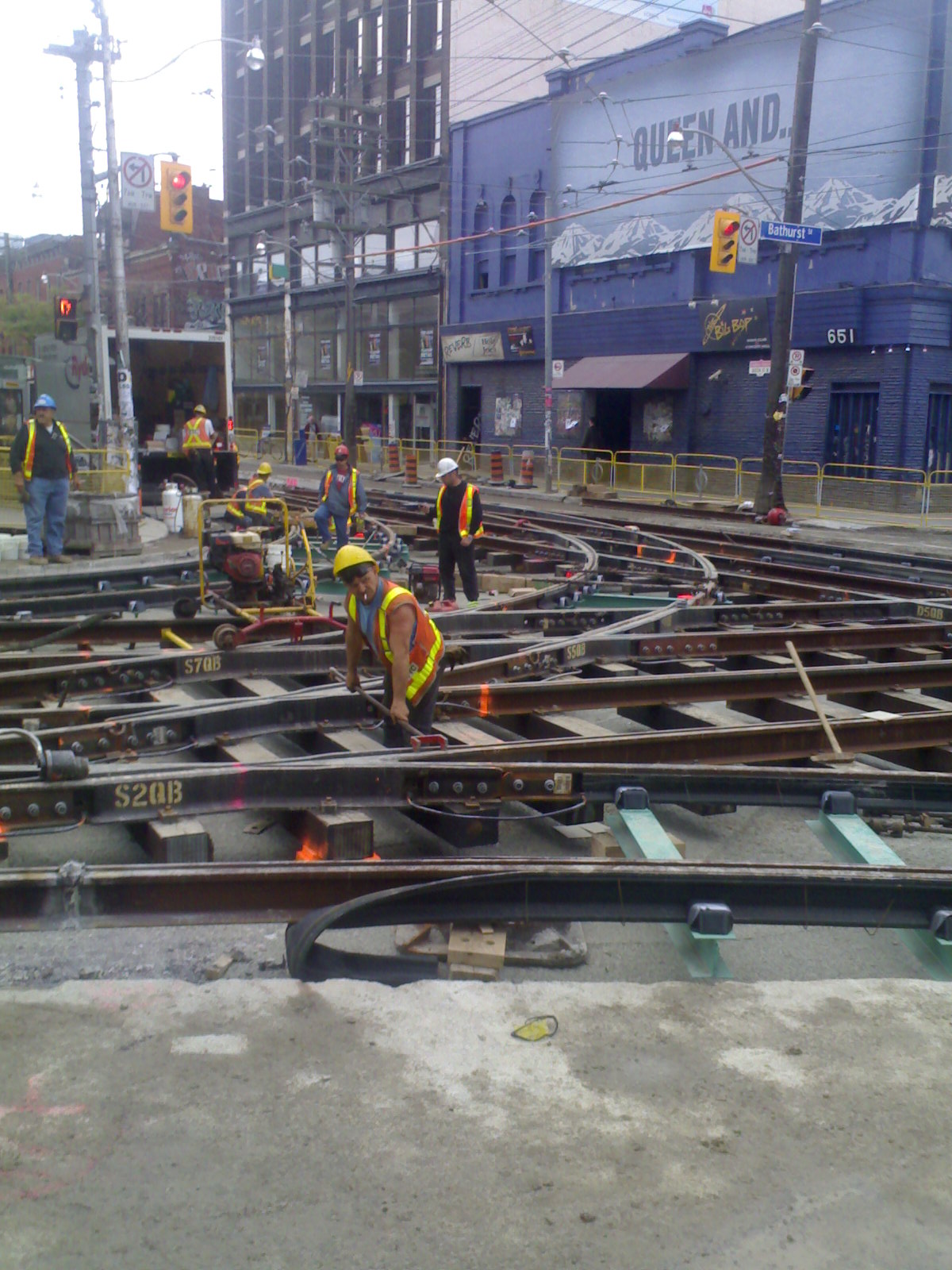
Pavement removed for repairs to the tracks, Toronto

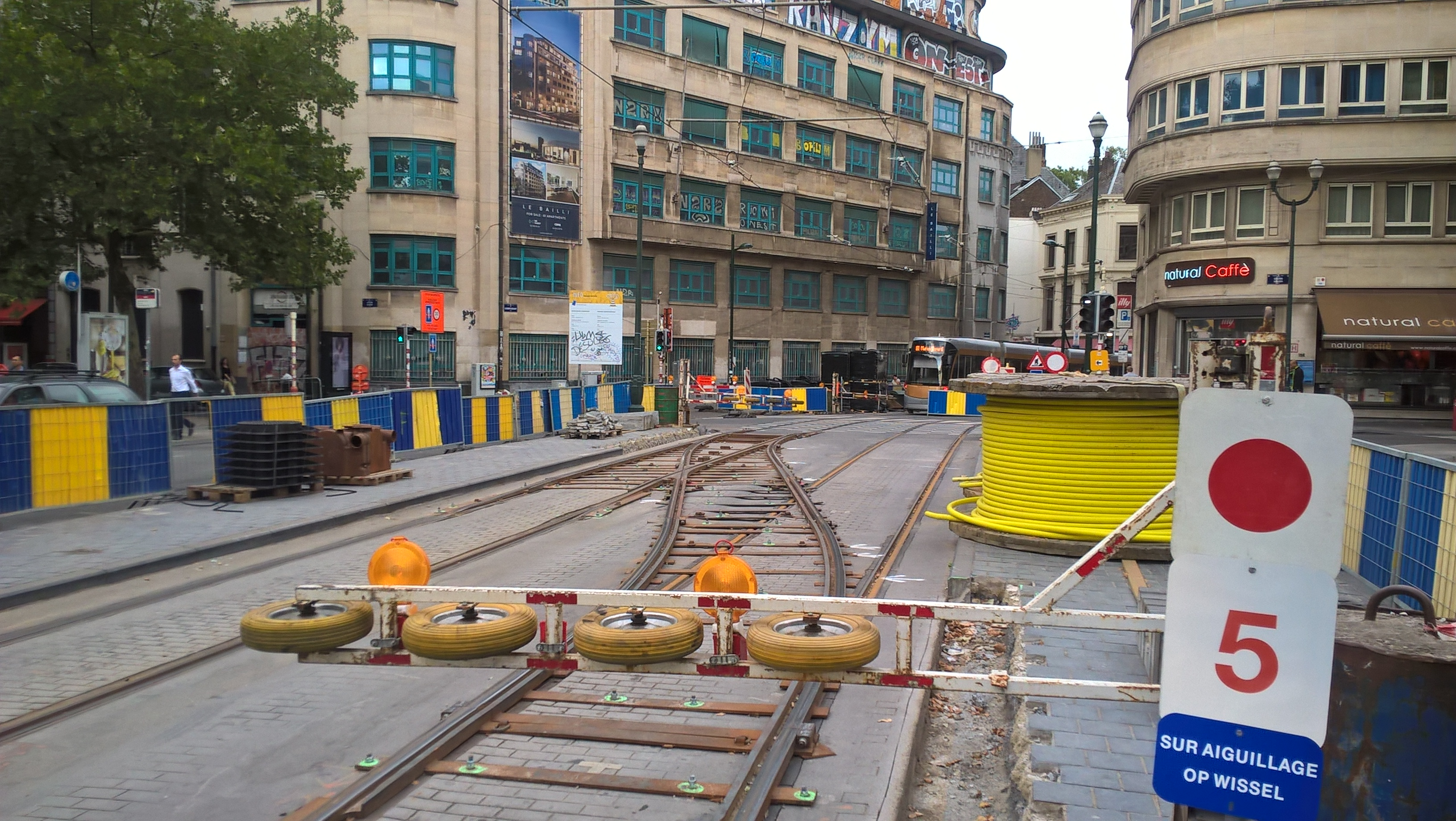
Temporary turnouts in Brussels, 2018

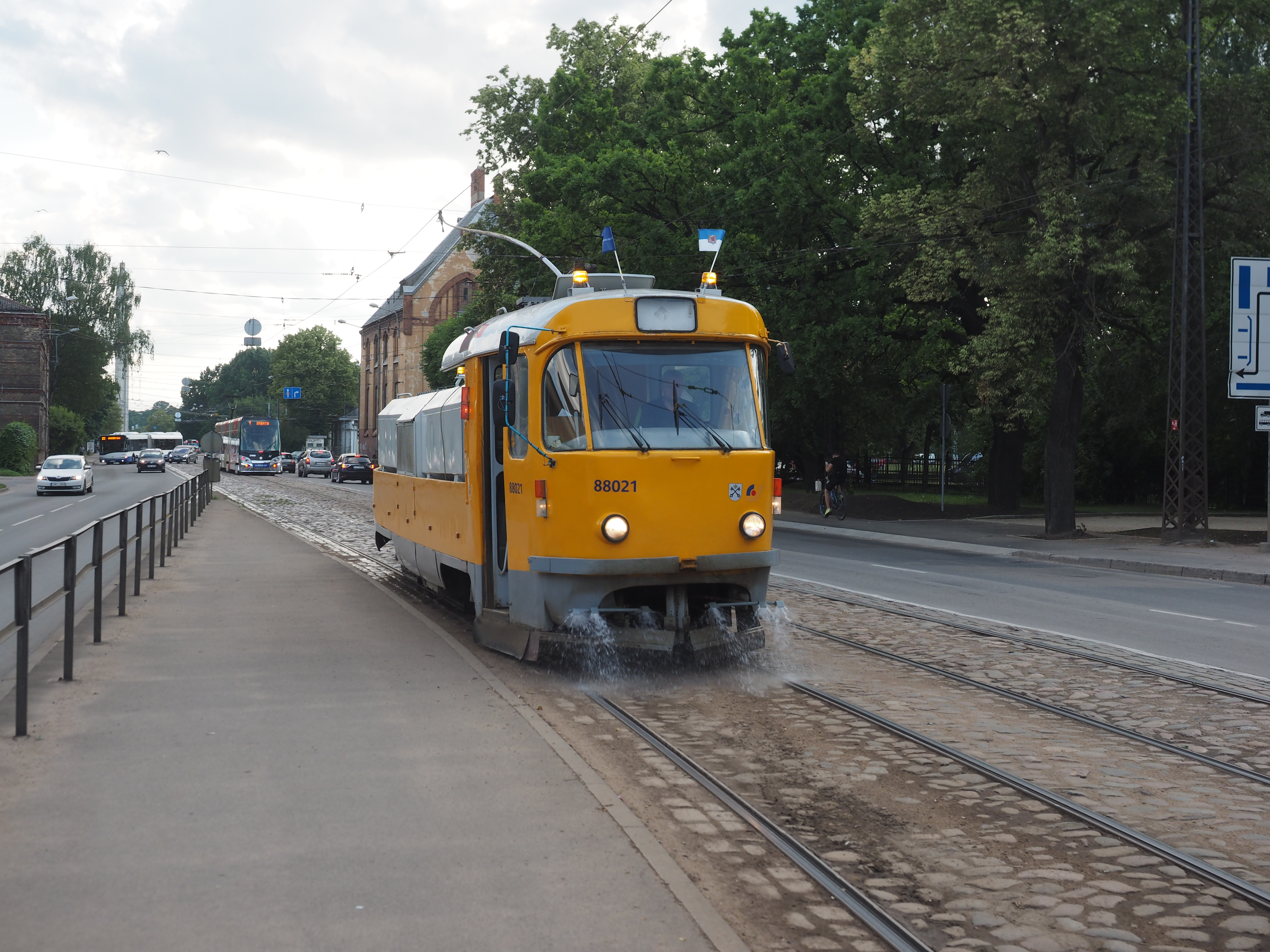
A specialised vehicle washing the tramway track in Riga, Latvia

== See also ==
- Difference between train and tram rails
- Grade (slope)
- Gauntlet track
- Minimum railway curve radius
- Rail profile
- Railroad switch (points)
- Railway guide rail
- Reserved track
- Street running
- Track transition curve
- Tram track gauge
- Tramway (industrial)
