= Rail profile =

Cross sectional shape of a railway rail

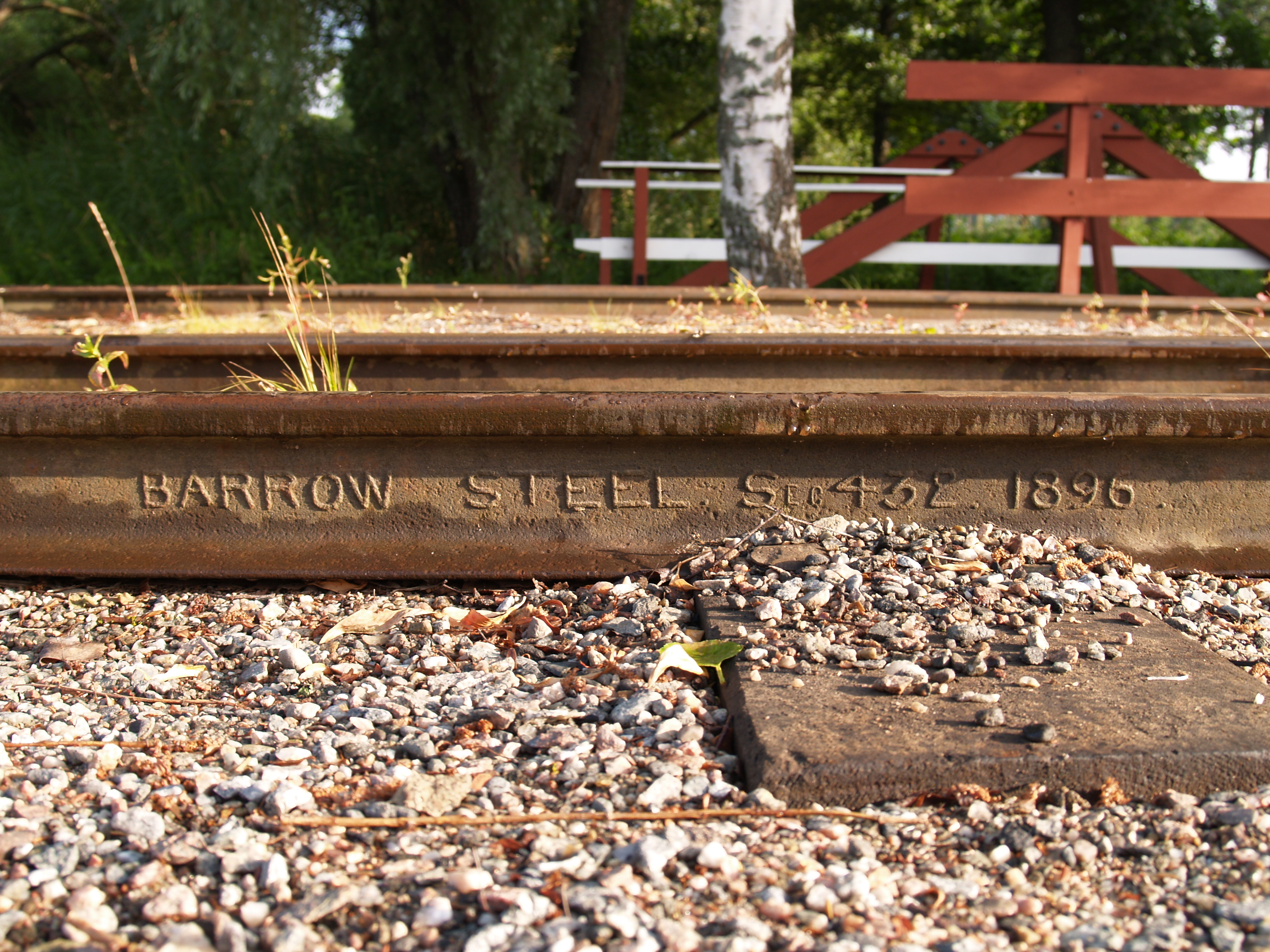
Rail from 1896 showing manufacturer's name and specification impressed into the web of rail during rolling

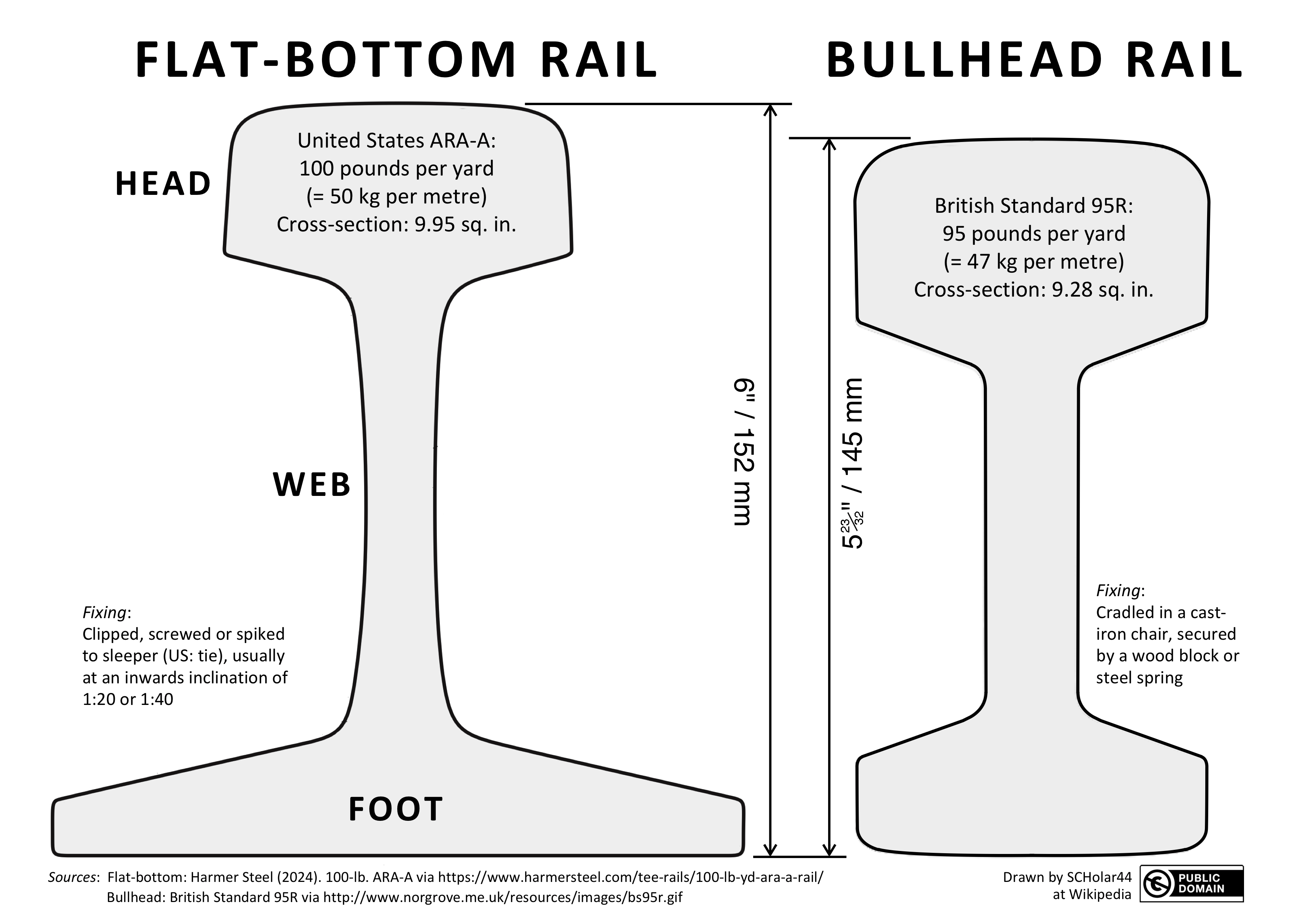
Cross-sections of present-day flat-bottom rail and (no longer installed) bullhead rail

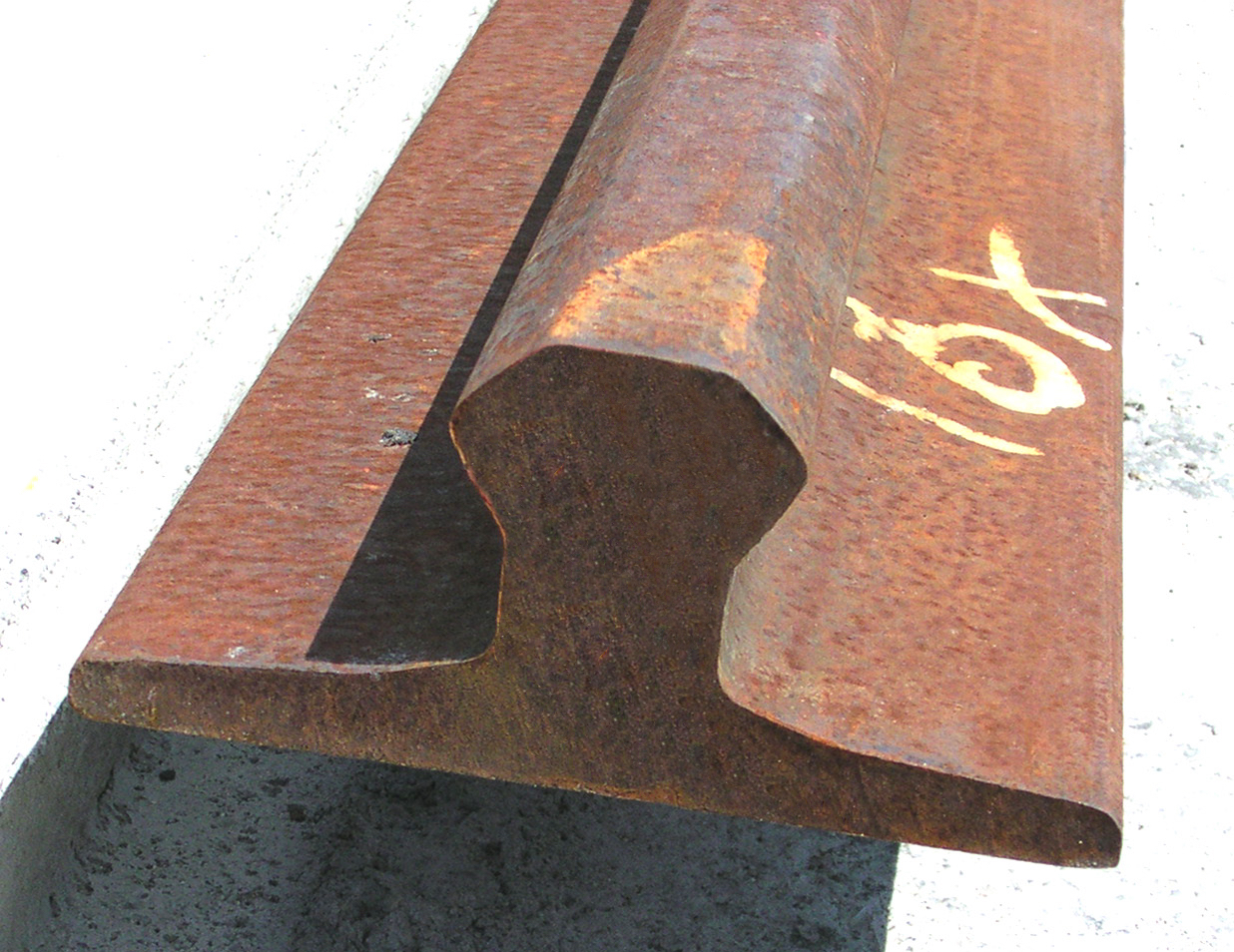
Section of the Translohr guidance rail (during the Clermont-Ferrand installation in 2006)

The rail profile is the cross-sectional shape of a rail as installed on a railway or railroad, perpendicular to its length.

Early rails were made of wood, cast iron or wrought iron. All modern rails are hot rolled steel with a cross section (profile) approximate to an I-beam, but asymmetric about a horizontal axis (however see grooved rail below). The head is profiled to resist wear and to give a good ride, and the foot profiled to suit the fixing system.

Unlike some other uses of iron and steel, railway rails are subject to very high stresses and are made of very high quality steel. It took many decades to improve the quality of the materials, including the change from iron to steel. Minor flaws in the steel that may pose no problems in other applications can lead to broken rails and dangerous derailments when used on railway tracks.

Generally, the heavier the railway tracks, the heavier and faster the trains which run through these tracks.

Rails represent a substantial fraction of the cost of a railway line. Only a small number of rail sizes are made by steelworks at one time, so a railway must choose the nearest suitable size. Worn, heavy rail from a mainline is often reclaimed and downgraded for re-use on a branch line, siding or yard.

== History ==
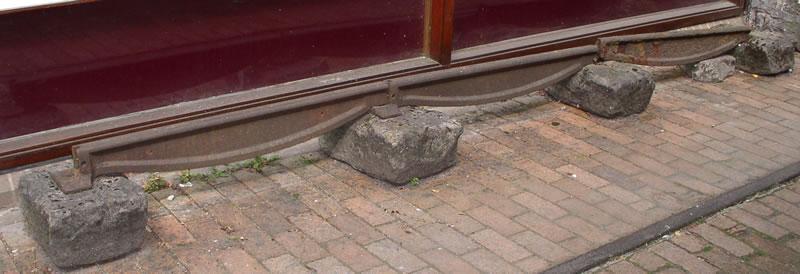
Fishbelly edge rails laid on stone blocks on the Cromford and High Peak Railway

Early rails in UK (not to scale)

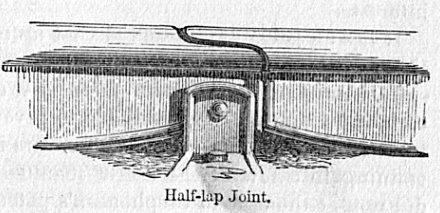
Stephenson-rail-patent half-lap jointed fishbelly rail patented in 1816

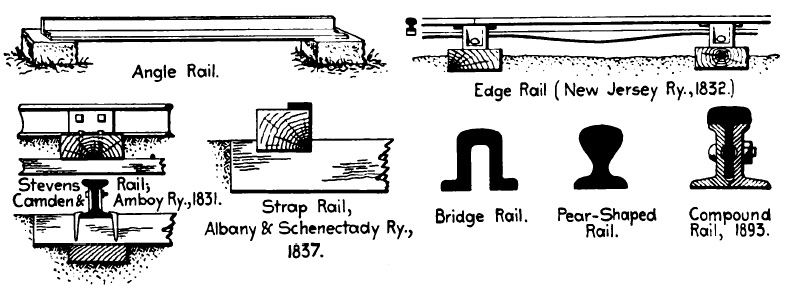
Early rails in the United States (not to scale)

The earliest rails used on horse-drawn wagonways were wooden. In the 1760s strap-iron rails were introduced with thin strips of cast iron fixed on to the top of the wooden rails, increased their durability. Both wooden and strap-iron rails were relatively inexpensive, but could only carry a limited weight. The metal strips of strap-iron rails sometimes separated from the wooden base and speared into the floor of the carriages above, creating what was referred to as a "snake head". The long-term maintenance expense involved outweighed the initial savings in construction costs.

Cast-iron rails with vertical flanges were introduced by Benjamin Outram of B. Outram & Co. which later became the Butterley Company in Ripley. The wagons that ran on these plateway rails had a flat profile. Outram's partner William Jessop preferred the use of "edge rails" where the wheels were flanged and the rail heads were flat - this configuration proved superior to plateways. Jessop's (fishbellied) first edge rails were cast by the Butterley Company.

The earliest of these in general use were short, cast-iron fishbelly rails, named for their shape. Rails made from cast iron were brittle and broke easily. They could only be made in short lengths, which soon led to unevenness of the track. As rolling techniques improved, John Birkinshaw's 1820 patent introduced wrought iron in longer lengths, replaced cast iron, and contributed significantly to the explosive growth of railroads in the period 1825–40. The cross-section varied widely from one line to another, but were of three basic types, as shown in the diagram. The parallel cross-section which developed in later years was referred to as bullhead.

Meanwhile, in May 1831, the first flanged T rail (also called T-section) arrived in America from Britain and was laid into the Pennsylvania Railroad by Camden and Amboy Railroad. They were also used by Charles Vignoles in Britain.

The first steel rails were made in 1857 by Robert Forester Mushet, who laid them at Derby station in England. Steel is a much stronger material, which steadily replaced iron for use on railway rail and allowed much longer lengths of rails to be rolled.

The American Railway Engineering Association (AREA) and the American Society for Testing Materials (ASTM) specified carbon, manganese, silicon and phosphorus content for steel rails. Tensile strength increases with carbon content, while ductility decreases. AREA and ASTM specified 0.55 to 0.77 percent carbon in 70-to-90-pound-per-yard (34.7 to 44.6 kg/m) rail, 0.67 to 0.80 percent in rail weights from 90 to 120 lb/yd (44.6 to 59.5 kg/m), and 0.69 to 0.82 percent for heavier rails. Manganese increases strength and resistance to abrasion. AREA and ASTM specified 0.6 to 0.9 percent manganese in 70 to 90 pound rail and 0.7 to 1 percent in heavier rails. Silicon is preferentially oxidised by oxygen and is added to reduce the formation of weakening metal oxides in the rail rolling and casting procedures. AREA and ASTM specified 0.1 to 0.23 percent silicon. Phosphorus and sulfur are impurities causing brittle rail with reduced impact-resistance. AREA and ASTM specified maximum phosphorus concentration of 0.04 percent.

The use of welded rather than jointed track began in around the 1940s and had become widespread by the 1960s.

== Types ==
=== Strap rail ===
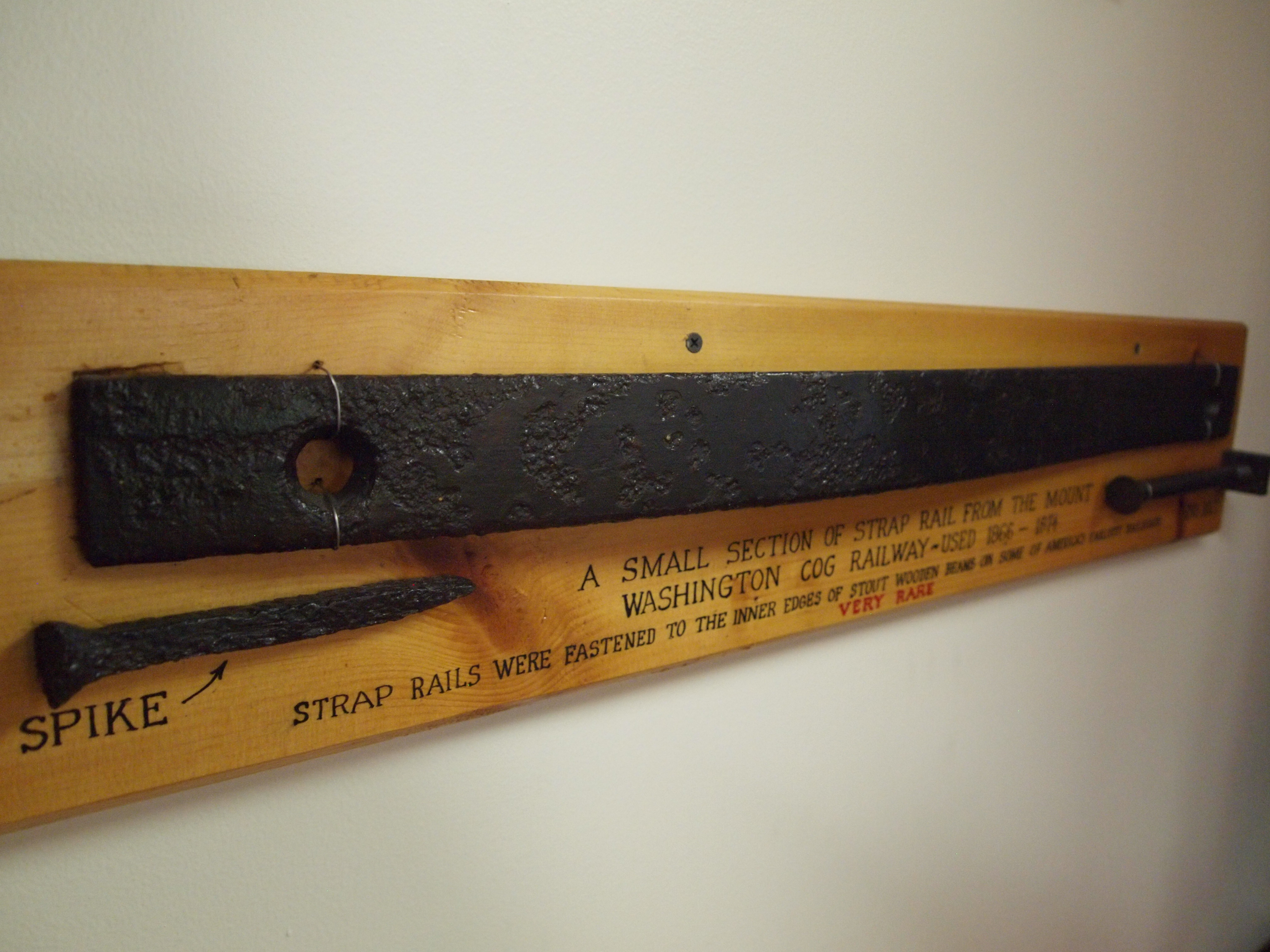
Strap rail and spike

The earliest rails were simply lengths of timber. To resist wear, a thin iron strap was laid on top of the timber rail. This saved money as wood was cheaper than metal. The system had the flaw that every so often the passage of the wheels on the train would cause the strap to break away from the timber. The problem was first reported by Richard Trevithick in 1802. The use of strap rails in the United States (for instance on the Albany and Schenectady Railroad c. 1837) led to passengers being threatened by "snake-heads" when the straps curled up and penetrated the carriages.

=== T-rail ===
T-rail was a development of strap rail which had a 'T' cross-section formed by widening the top of the strap into a head. This form of rail was generally short-lived, being phased out in America by 1855.

=== Plate rail ===
Plate rail was an early type of rail and had an 'L' cross-section in which the flange kept an unflanged wheel on the track. The flanged rail has seen a minor revival in the 1950s, as guide bars, with the Paris Métro (Rubber-tyred metro or French Métro sur pneus) and more recently as the Guided bus. In the Cambridgeshire Guided Busway the rail is a 350 mm (14 in) thick concrete beam with a 180 mm (7.1 in) lip to form the flange. The buses run on normal road wheels with side-mounted guidewheels to run against the flanges. Buses are steered normally when off the busway, analogous to the 18th-century wagons which could be manoeuvered around pitheads before joining the track for the longer haul.

=== Bridge rail ===
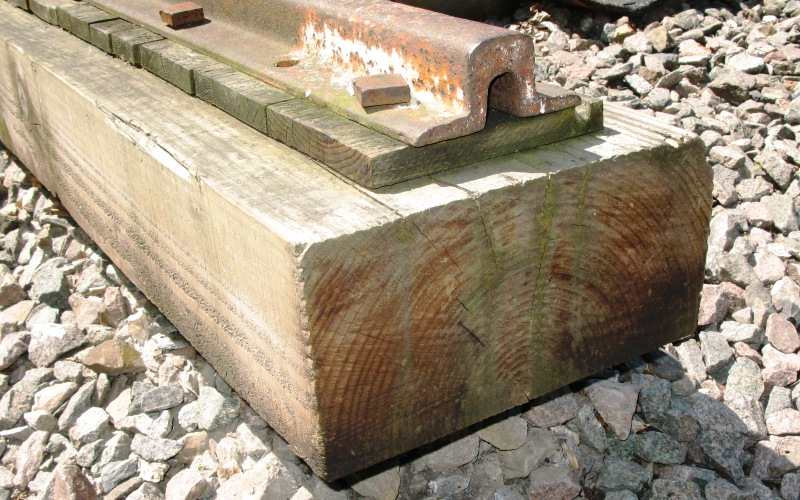
A cross-section through the Great Western Railway's baulk road, made with bridge rail

Bridge rail or box rail is a rail with an inverted-U profile. Its simple shape is easy to manufacture, and it was widely used before more sophisticated profiles became cheap enough to make in bulk. It was notably used on the Great Western Railway's 7 ft 1/4 in (2,140 mm) gauge baulk road, designed by Isambard Kingdom Brunel.

=== Barlow rail ===
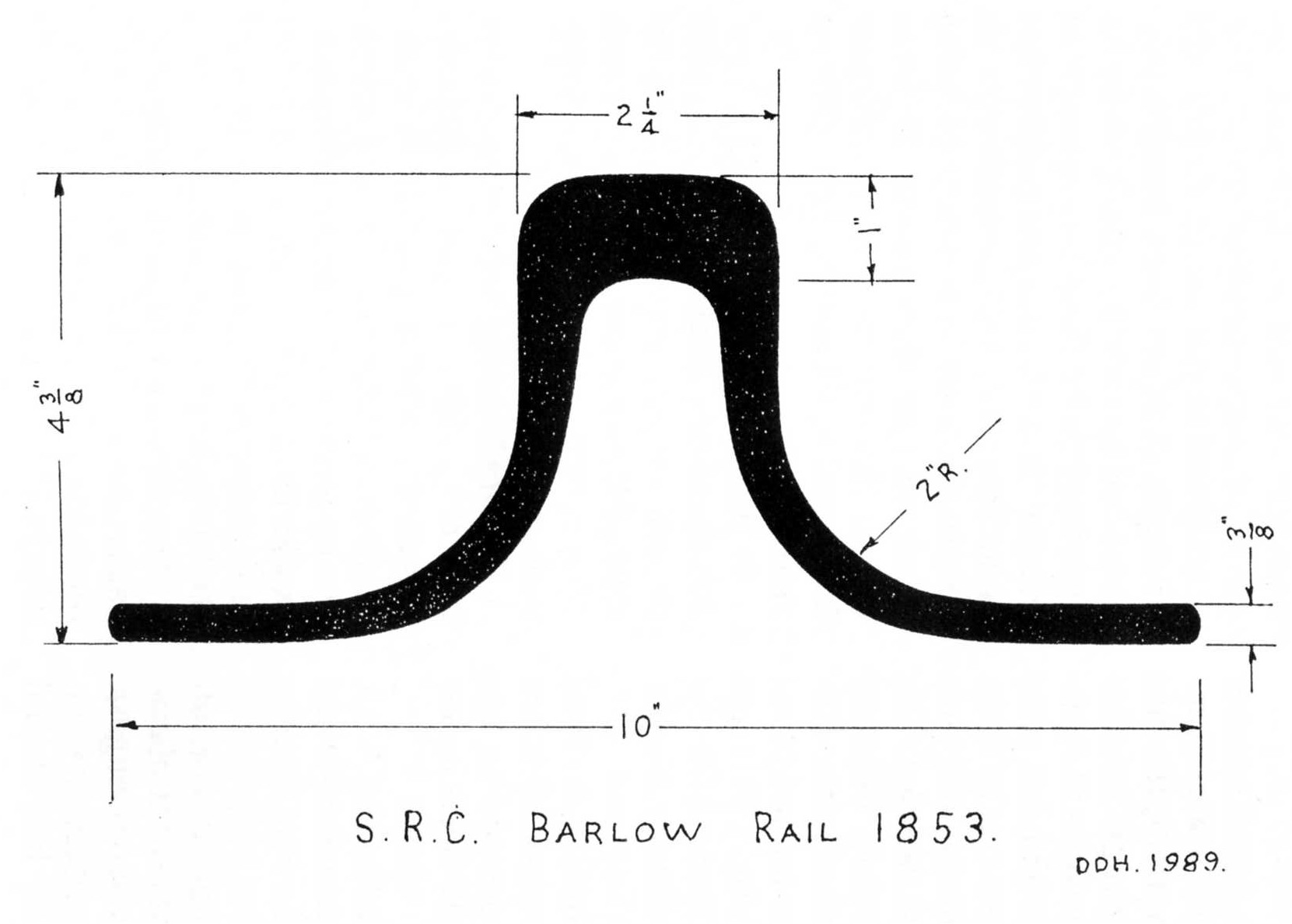
Cross section of Barlow rail as used by Sydney Railway Company

Barlow rail was invented by William Henry Barlow in 1849. It was designed to be laid straight onto the ballast, but the lack of sleepers (ties) meant that it was difficult to keep it in gauge.

=== Flanged T-rail ===
Flanged T-rail or T-section rail is the name used in North America for flat-bottom rail. Colonel Robert L. Stevens, the president of the Camden and Amboy Railroad, considered that wrought-iron rail would be better than the iron-strapped wooden rails used on all United States railroads. No steel mills in North America were capable of rolling long lengths, so he sailed to the United Kingdom, which at the time was the only place where flanged T-rail could be rolled. In May 1831, the first 500 rails, each 15 feet (4.6 m) long and weighing 36 pounds per yard (17.9 kg/m), reached Philadelphia and were spiked on to crossties, marking the first use of the flanged T-rail in the United States. Flanged T-rail quickly became the standard pattern adopted by all US railroads.

Colonel Stevens also invented the hooked spike for attaching the rail to the crosstie. In 1860, the screw spike was introduced in France where it was widely used. Screw spikes are the most common form of spike in use worldwide in the 21st century.

=== Flat-bottom rail ===
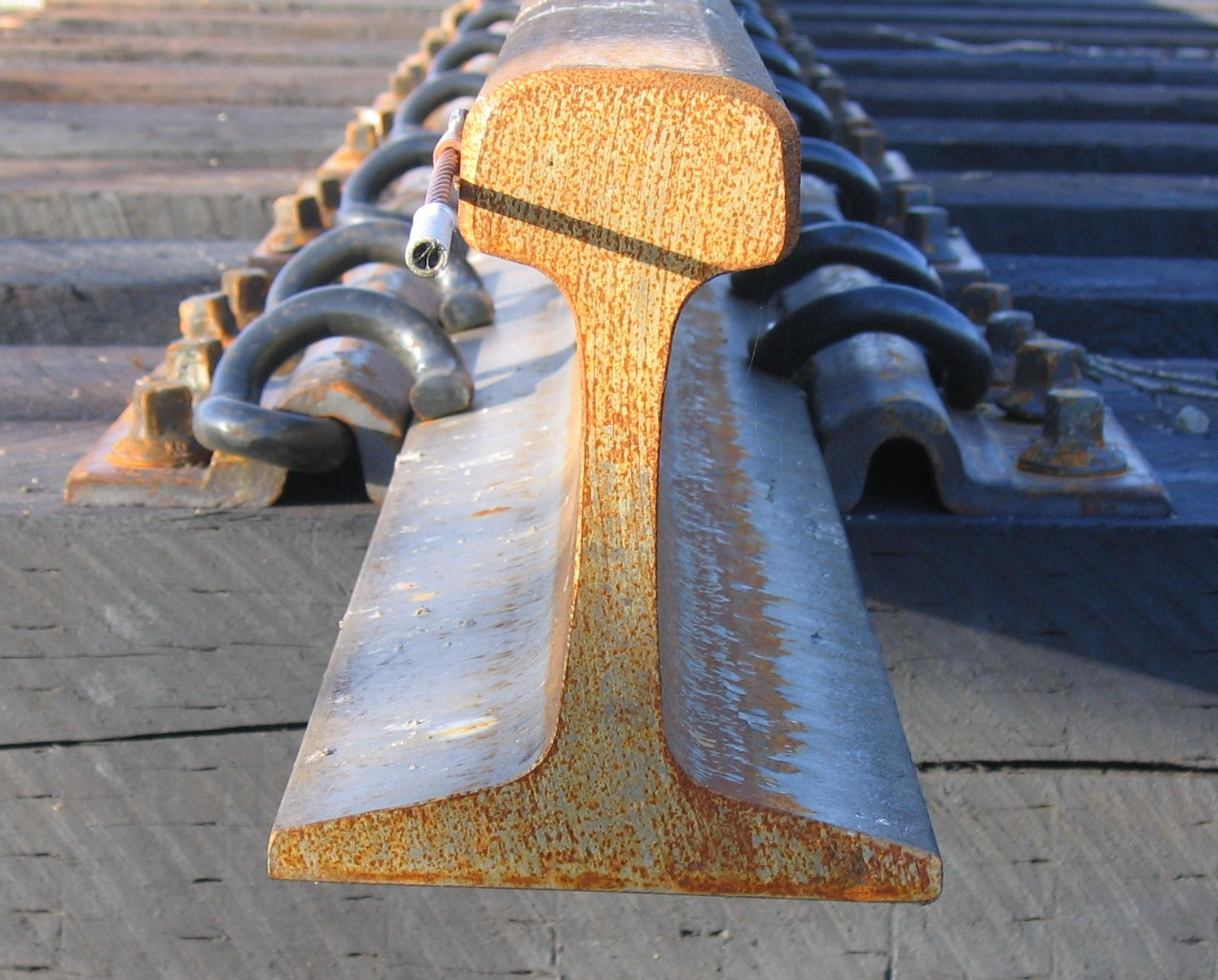
Cross section of new flat-bottom rail

Flat-bottom rail is the dominant rail profile in worldwide use.

Vignoles rail is a commonly used name for flat-bottom rail, after engineer Charles Vignoles who introduced it to Britain. Charles Vignoles observed that wear was occurring with wrought iron rails and cast iron chairs on stone blocks – the most common system at that time. In 1836 he recommended flat-bottom rail to the London and Croydon Railway, to which he was the consulting engineer. His original rail had a smaller cross-section than the Stevens rail, with a wider base than modern rail, fastened with screws through the base. Other lines that adopted it were the Hull and Selby, the Newcastle and North Shields, and the Manchester, Bolton and Bury Canal Navigation and Railway Company.

In the UK, when it became possible to preserve wooden sleepers with mercuric chloride (a process called Kyanising) and creosote, a much steadier, quieter ride resulted than with stone blocks. Rails were fastened directly to the sleepers using rail spikes. Their use, and Vignoles's name, spread worldwide. However, UK railway companies strongly preferred bullhead rail, fixed by wooden keys in cast-iron chairs, until the 1970s.

The joint where the ends of two rails are connected to each other is the weakest part of a rail line. The earliest iron rails were joined by a simple fishplate or bar of metal bolted through the web of the rail. Stronger methods of joining two rails together have been developed. When sufficient metal is put into the rail joint, the joint is almost as strong as the rest of the rail length. The noise generated by trains passing over the rail joints, described as "the clickity clack of the railroad track", can be eliminated by welding the rail sections together. Continuously welded rail has a uniform top profile even at the joints.

=== Double-headed rail ===
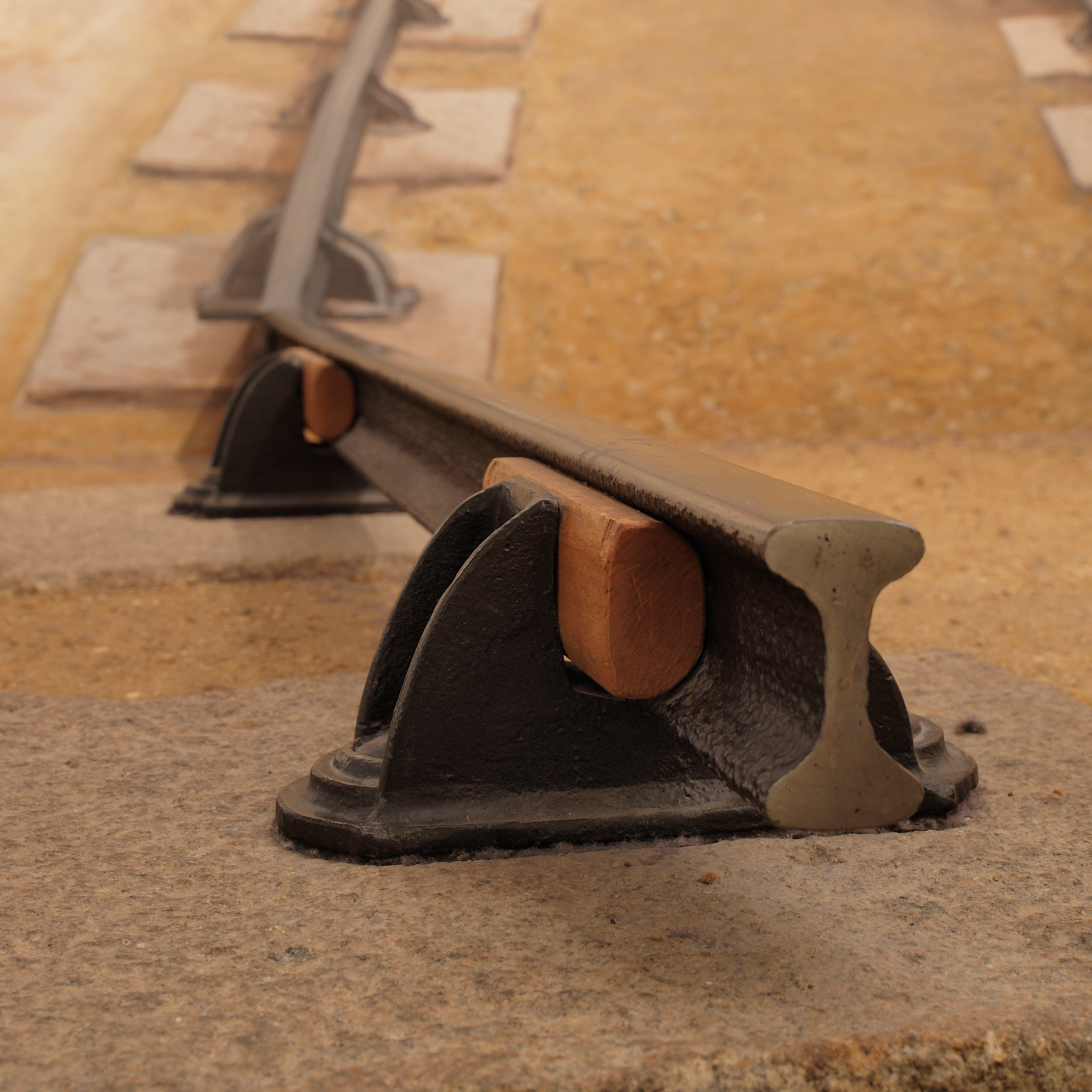
Double-headed rail on display at the Nuremberg Transport Museum

In late 1830s, Britain's railways used a range of different rail patterns. The London and Birmingham Railway, which had offered a prize for the best design, and was one of the earliest lines to use double-headed rail, where the head and foot of the rail had the same profile. These rails were supported by chairs fastened to the sleepers.

The advantage of double-headed rails was that, when the rail head became worn, they could be turned over and re-used. In 1835 Peter Barlow of the London and Birmingham Railway expressed concern that this would not be successful because the supporting chair would cause indentations in the lower surface of the rail, making it unsuitable as the running surface. Although the Great Northern Railway did experience this problem, double-headed rails were successfully used and turned by the London and South Western Railway, the North Eastern Railway, the London, Brighton and South Coast Railway and the South Eastern Railway. Double-headed rails continued in widespread use in Britain until the First World War.

=== Bullhead rail ===
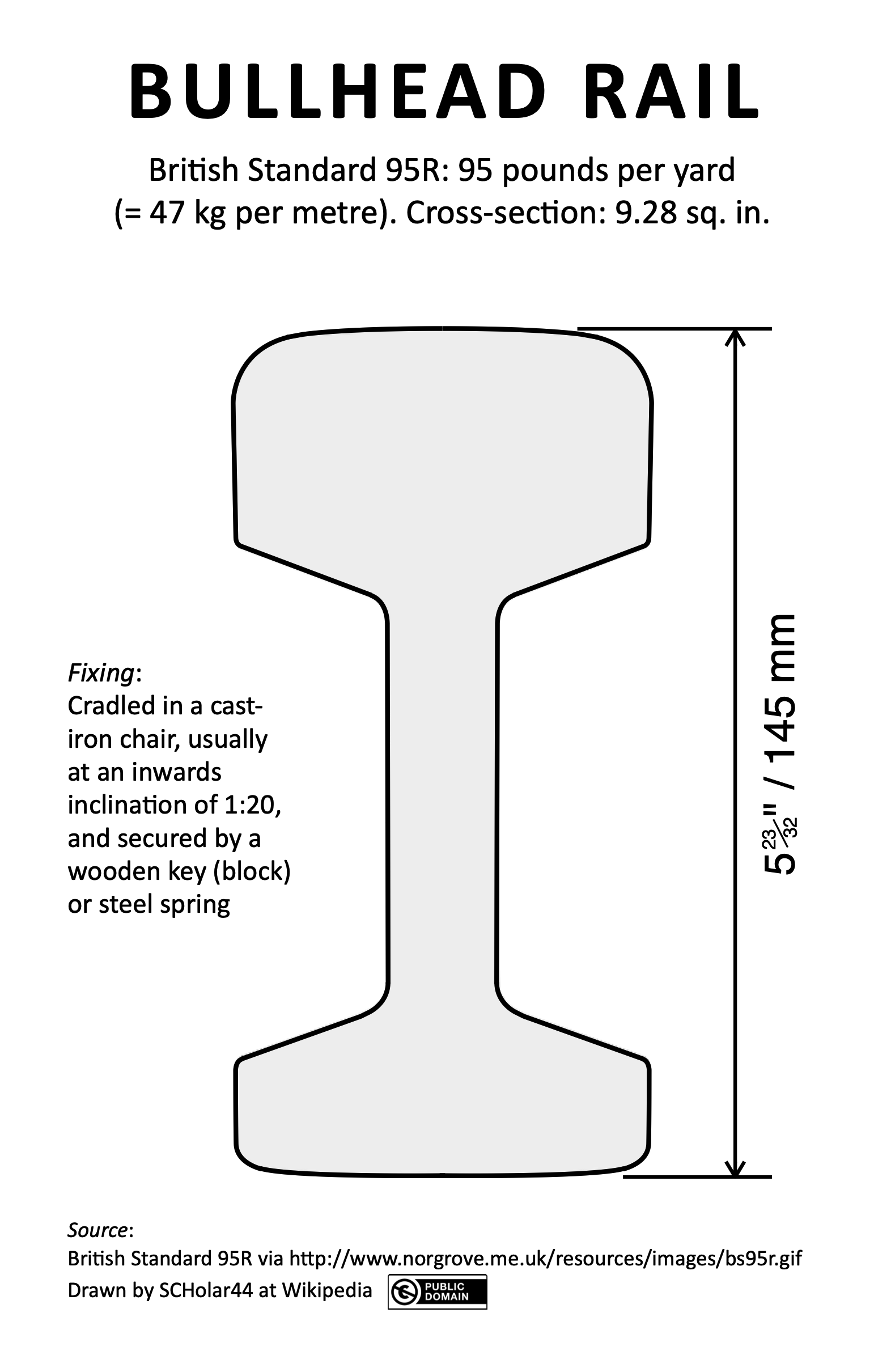
British Standard 95 pounds-per-yard bullhead rail

Bullhead rail was developed from double-headed rail. The profile of the head of the rail is not the same as the foot. Because it does not have a symmetrical profile, it was not possible to reverse bullhead rail over and use the foot as the head. It was an expensive method of laying track as heavy cast iron chairs were needed to support the rail, which was secured in the chairs by wooden (later steel) wedges or "keys", which required regular attention.

Bullhead rail was the standard for the British railway system from the mid-19th until the mid-20th century. In 1954, bullhead rail was used on 449 miles (723 km) of new track and flat-bottom rail on 923 miles (1,485 km). One of the first British Standards, BS 9, was for bullhead rail, which was originally published in 1905, and revised in 1924. Rails manufactured to the 1905 standard were referred to as "O.B.S." (Original), and those manufactured to the 1924 standard as "R.B.S." (Revised).

Bullhead rail has been almost completely replaced by flat-bottom rail on the British rail system, although it survives on some branch lines and sidings. It can also be found on heritage railways, due both to the desire to maintain an historic appearance, and the use of old track components salvaged from main lines. The London Underground continued to use bullhead rail after it had been phased out elsewhere in Britain but, in the last few years, there has been a concerted effort to replace it with flat-bottom rail. However, the process of replacing track in tunnels is a slow one, due to the difficulty of using heavy plant and machinery.

=== Grooved rail ===
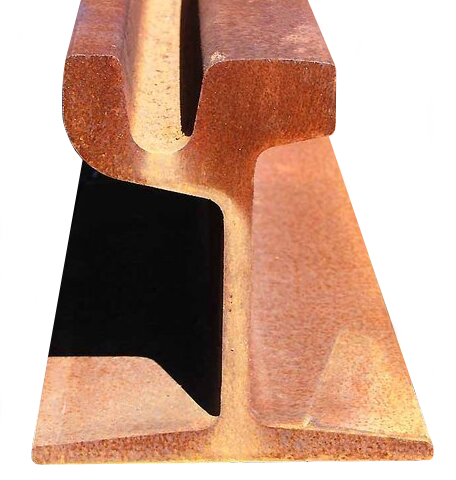
Grooved rail, used when track is laid in places traversed by other vehicles or pedestrians

Where a rail is laid in a road surface (pavement) or within grassed surfaces, there has to be accommodation for the flange. This is provided by a slot called the flangeway. The rail is then known as grooved rail, groove rail, or girder rail. The flangeway has the railhead on one side and the guard on the other. The guard carries no weight, but may act as a checkrail.

Grooved rail was invented in 1852 by Alphonse Loubat, a French inventor who developed improvements in tram and rail equipment, and helped develop tram lines in New York City and Paris. The invention of grooved rail enabled tramways to be laid without causing a nuisance to other road users, except unsuspecting cyclists, who could get their wheels caught in the groove. The grooves may become filled with gravel and dirt (particularly if infrequently used or after a period of idleness) and need clearing from time to time, this being done by a "scrubber" vehicle (either a specialised tram, or a maintenance road-rail vehicle). Failure to clear the grooves can lead to a bumpy ride for the passengers, damage to either wheel or rail and possibly derailing.

=== Girder guard rail ===
The traditional form of grooved rail is the girder guard section illustrated to the left. This rail is a modified form of flanged rail and requires a special mounting for weight transfer and gauge stabilisation. If the weight is carried by the roadway subsurface, steel ties are needed at regular intervals to maintain the gauge. Installing these means that the whole surface needs to be excavated and reinstated.

=== Block rail ===
Block rail is a lower profile form of girder guard rail with the web eliminated. In profile it is more like a solid form of bridge rail, with a flangeway and guard added. Simply removing the web and combining the head section directly with the foot section would result in a weak rail, so additional thickness is required in the combined section.

A modern block rail with a further reduction in mass is the LR55 rail which is polyurethane grouted into a prefabricated concrete beam. It can be set in trench grooves cut into an existing asphalt road bed for Light Rail (trams).

== Rail weights and sizes ==
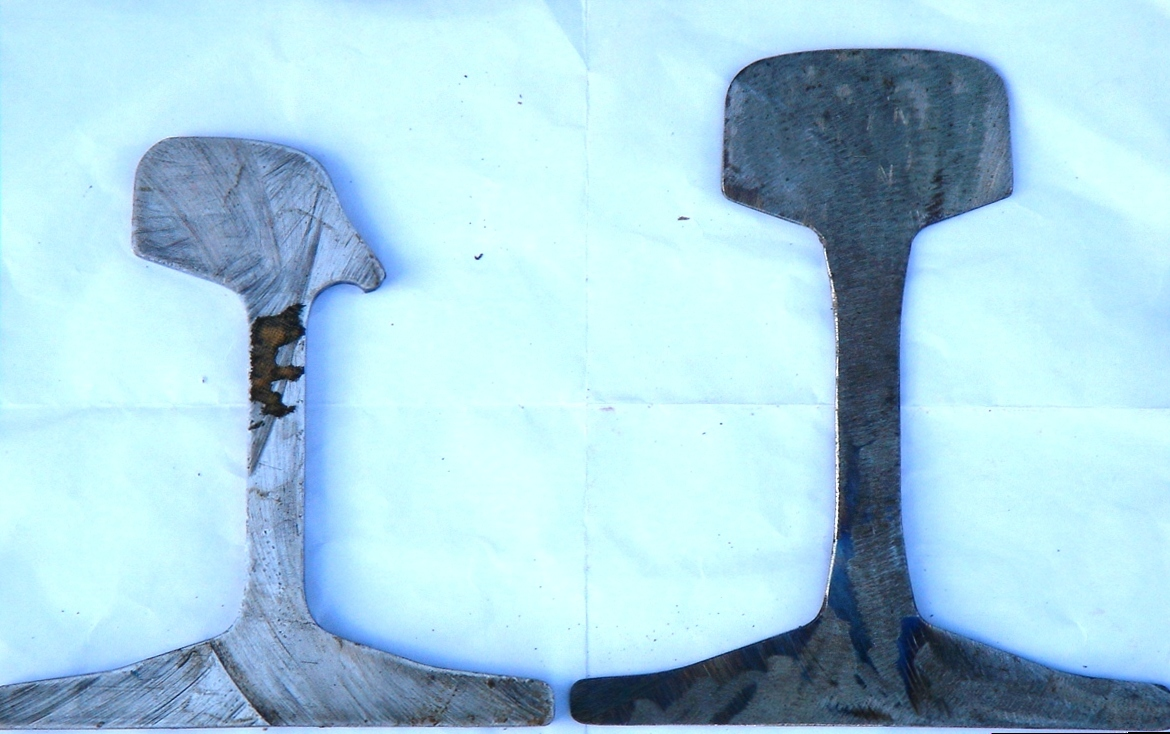
Two commonly used rail profiles: a heavily worn 50-kg/m profile and a new 60-kg/m profile

The weight of a rail per length is an important factor in determining rail strength and hence axleloads and speeds.

Weights are measured in pounds per yard (imperial units in Canada and United States) and kilograms per metre (metric units in the United Kingdom, mainland Europe and Australia). 1 kg/m equals 2.0159 lb/yd.

Commonly, in rail terminology pound is a metonym for the expression pounds per yard and hence a 132–pound rail means a rail of 132 pounds per yard.

=== Europe ===
Rails are made in a large number of different sizes. Some common European rail sizes include:

- 40 kg/m (81 lb/yd)
- 50 kg/m (101 lb/yd)
- 54 kg/m (109 lb/yd)
- 56 kg/m (113 lb/yd)
- 60 kg/m (121 lb/yd)

In the countries of the former USSR, 65 kg/m (131 lb/yd) rails and 75 kg/m (151 lb/yd) rails (not thermally hardened) are common. Thermally hardened 75 kg/m (151 lb/yd) rails also have been used on heavy-duty railroads like Baikal–Amur Mainline, but have proven themselves deficient in operation and were mainly rejected in favor of 65 kg/m (131 lb/yd) rails.

The high-speed rail (HSR) systems of France (TGV) and Germany (ICE) use 60 kg/m (121 lb/yd) rails.

=== North America ===
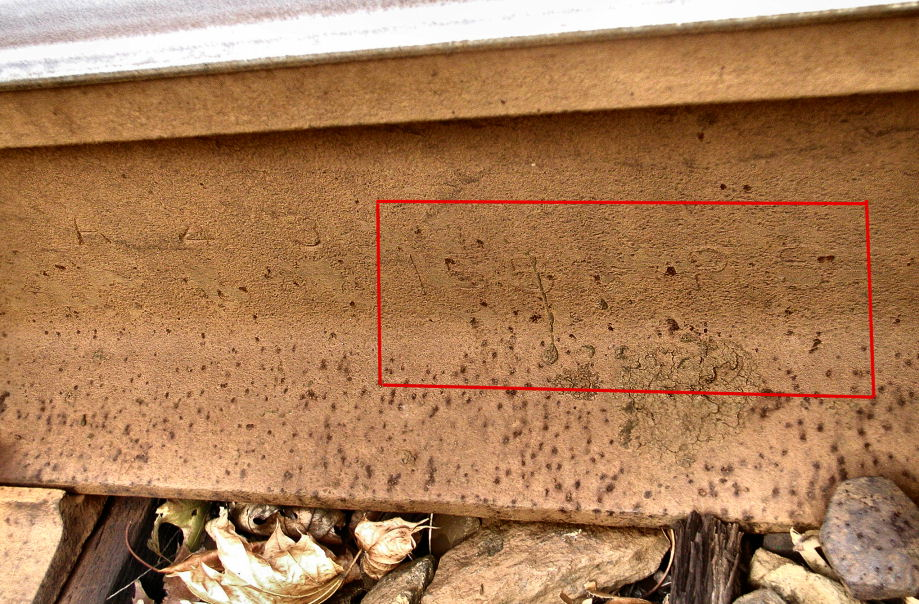
Weight mark "155 PS" on a jointed segment of 155 lb/yd (76.9 kg/m) "Pennsylvania Special" rail, the heaviest grade of rail ever mass-produced

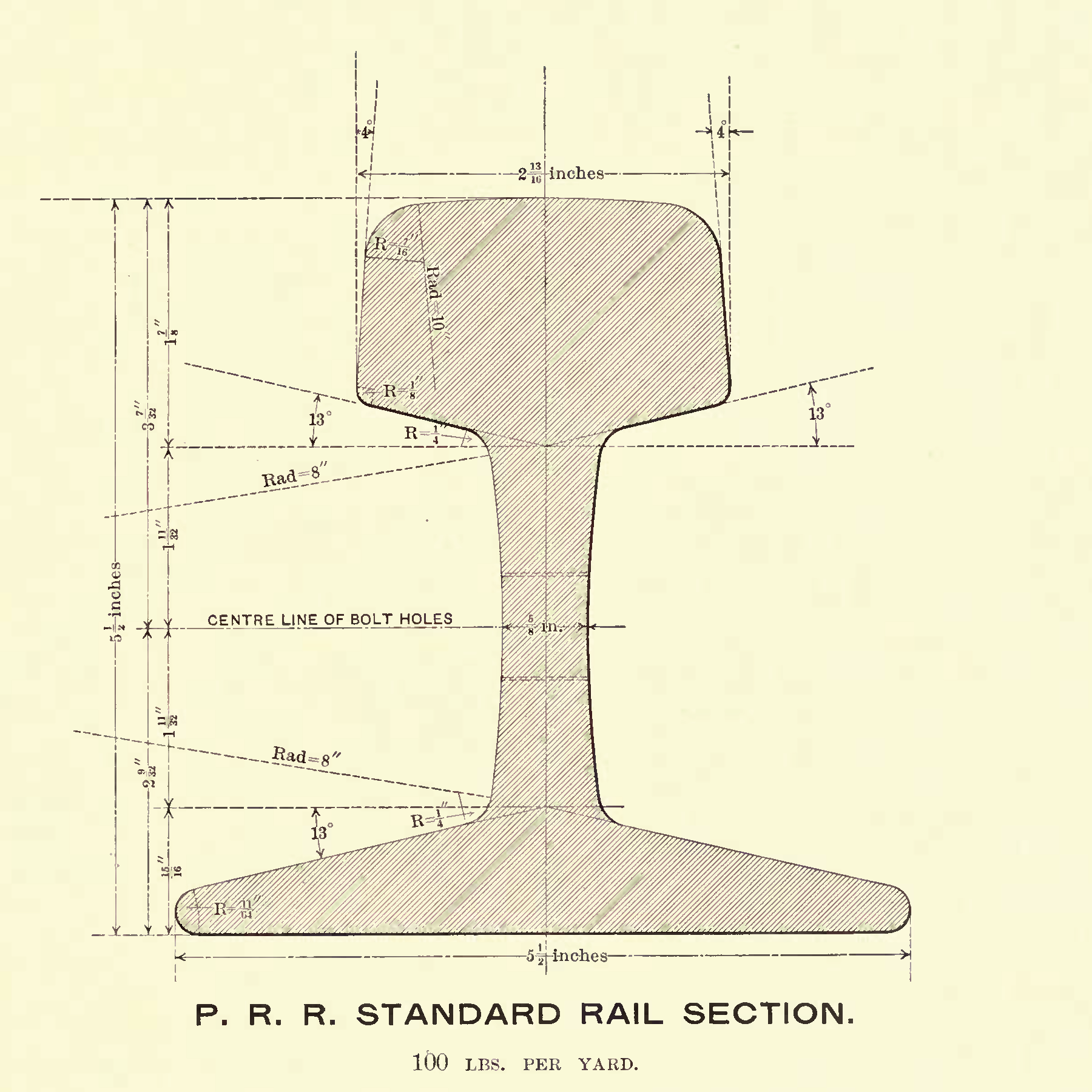
Cross-section drawing showing measurements in Imperial units for 100 lb/yd (49.6 kg/m) rail used in the United States, c. 1890s

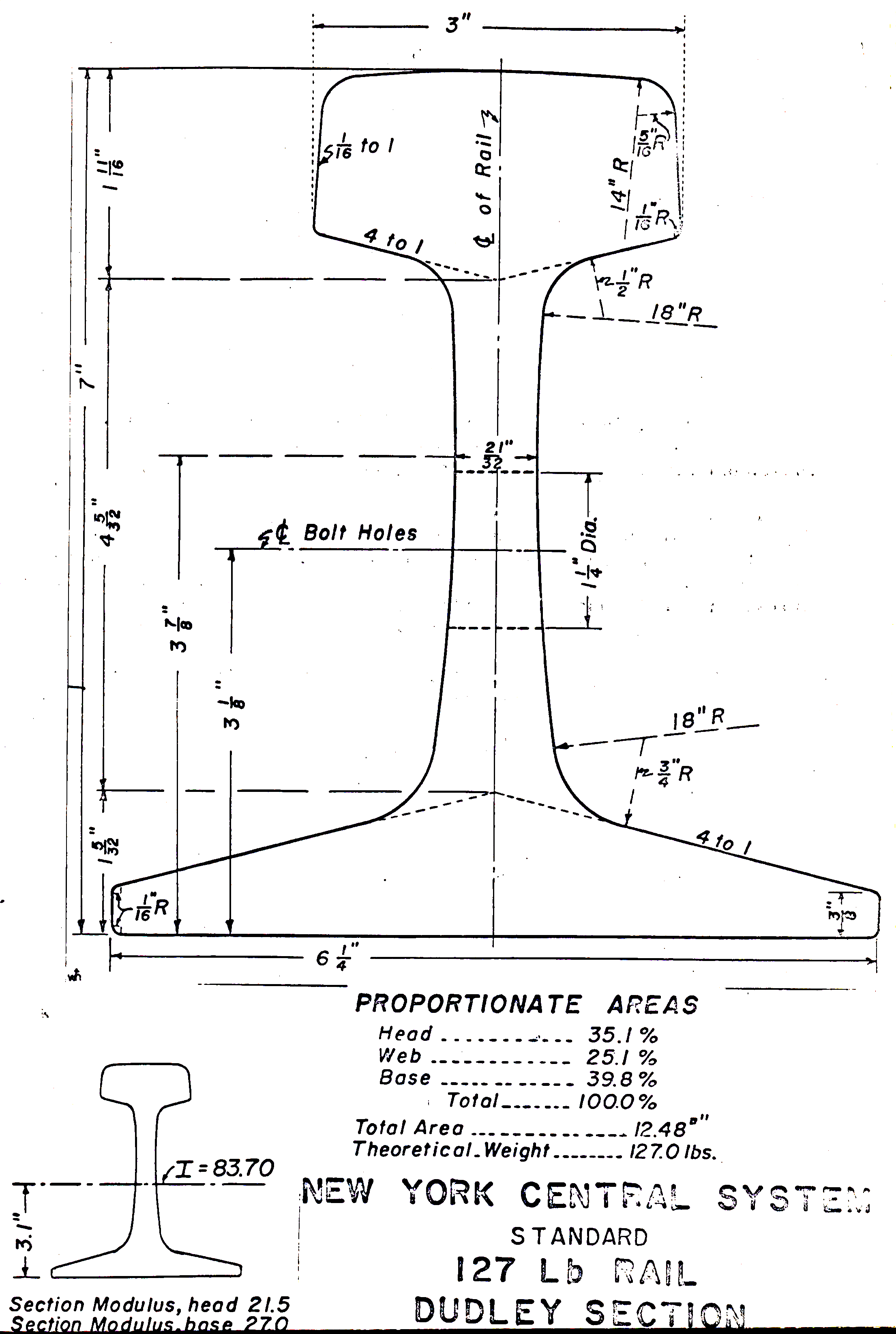
New York Central System Dudley 127 lb/yd (63.0 kg/m) rail cross section

The American Society of Civil Engineers (ASCE) specified rail profiles in 1893 for 5 lb/yd (2.5 kg/m) increments from 40 to 100 lb/yd (19.8 to 49.6 kg/m). Height of rail equaled width of foot for each ASCE tee-rail weight; and the profiles specified fixed proportion of weight in head, web and foot of 42%, 21% and 37%, respectively. ASCE 90 lb/yd (44.6 kg/m) profile was adequate; but heavier weights were less satisfactory. In 1909, the American Railway Association (or ARA) specified standard profiles for 10 lb/yd (4.96 kg/m) increments from 60 to 100 lb/yd (29.8 to 49.6 kg/m). The American Railway Engineering Association (or AREA) specified standard profiles for 100 lb/yd (49.6 kg/m), 110 lb/yd (54.6 kg/m) and 120 lb/yd (59.5 kg/m) rails in 1919, for 130 lb/yd (64.5 kg/m) and 140 lb/yd (69.4 kg/m) rails in 1920, and for 150 lb/yd (74.4 kg/m) rails in 1924. The trend was to increase rail height/foot-width ratio and strengthen the web. Disadvantages of the narrower foot were overcome through use of tie plates. AREA recommendations reduced the relative weight of rail head down to 36%, while alternative profiles reduced head weight to 33% in heavier weight rails. Attention was also focused on improved fillet radii to reduce stress concentration at the web junction with the head. AREA recommended the ARA 90 lb/yd (44.6 kg/m) profile. Old ASCE rails of lighter weight remained in use, and satisfied the limited demand for light rail for a few decades. AREA merged into the American Railway Engineering and Maintenance-of-Way Association in 1997.

By the mid-20th century, most rail production was medium heavy (112 to 119 lb/yd or 55.6 to 59.0 kg/m) and heavy (127 to 140 lb/yd or 63.0 to 69.4 kg/m). Sizes under 100 lb/yd (49.6 kg/m) rail are usually for lighter duty freight, low use trackage, or light rail. Track using 100 to 120 lb/yd (49.6 to 59.5 kg/m) rail is for lower speed freight branch lines or rapid transit. Main line track is usually built with 130 lb/yd (64.5 kg/m) rail or heavier. Some common North American rail sizes include:

- 75 lb/yd (37.2 kg/m) (ASCE)
- 80 lb/yd (39.7 kg/m) (Dudley) New York Central Railroad
- 85 lb/yd (42.2 kg/m) (ASCE)
- 90 lb/yd (44.6 kg/m) (ARA)
- 100 lb/yd (49.6 kg/m) (AREA)
- 105 lb/yd (52.1 kg/m) (Dudley) New York Central Railroad
- 112 lb/yd (55.6 kg/m) (KCSC)
- 115 lb/yd (57.0 kg/m) (AREA)
- 119 lb/yd (59.0 kg/m) Colorado Fuel and Iron
- 127 lb/yd (63.0 kg/m) (Dudley) New York Central Railroad
- 132 lb/yd (65.5 kg/m) (AREA)
- 133 lb/yd (66.0 kg/m) (AREA)
- 136 lb/yd (67.5 kg/m) Colorado Fuel and Iron
- 140 lb/yd (69.4 kg/m) (AREA)
- 141 lb/yd (69.9 kg/m) (produced by Nippon (Japan))
- 155 lb/yd (76.9 kg/m) (no longer in production) Pennsylvania Railroad

==== Crane rails ====
Some common North American crane rail sizes include:

- 12 lb/yd (5.95 kg/m)
- 20 lb/yd (9.9 kg/m)
- 25 lb/yd (12.4 kg/m)
- 30 lb/yd (14.9 kg/m)
- 40 lb/yd (19.8 kg/m)
- 60 lb/yd (29.8 kg/m)
- 80 lb/yd (39.7 kg/m)
- 85 lb/yd (42.2 kg/m)
- 104 lb/yd (51.6 kg/m)
- 105 lb/yd (52.1 kg/m)
- 135 lb/yd (67 kg/m)
- 171 lb/yd (84.8 kg/m)
- 175 lb/yd (86.8 kg/m)

=== Australia ===
Some common Australian rail sizes include:

- 30 kg/m (60 lb/yd)
- 36 kg/m (73 lb/yd)
- 40 kg/m (81 lb/yd)
- 47 kg/m (95 lb/yd)
- 50 kg/m (101 lb/yd)
- 53 kg/m (107 lb/yd)
- 60 kg/m (121 lb/yd)
- 68 kg/m (137 lb/yd)
- 68 kg/m (137 lb/yd) rails are used on the heavy-haul iron ore railways in the north-west of the state of Western Australia.
- 50 kg/m and 60 kg/m are the current standard on mainlines elsewhere, although some other sizes are still manufactured.

== Rail lengths ==
Advances in rail lengths produced by rolling mills include the following:

- 1825: 15 feet (4.6 m) Stockton and Darlington Railway 5.6 lb/yd (2.78 kg/m)
- 1830: 15 feet (4.6 m) Liverpool and Manchester Railway 35 lb/yd (17.4 kg/m) fish-belly rails
- 1850: 39 feet (11.9 m) United States, to fit 40-foot (12.2 m) gondola cars
- 1895: 60 feet (18.3 m) London and North Western Railway (UK) – four times 15 ft (4.6 m) and twice 30 ft (9.1 m)
- 2003: 709 feet (216 m) (Railtrack (UK) rail delivery train)
- 2010: 853.0 feet (260 m) Bhilai Steel Plant, India – four times 213 ft (65 m) and twice 430 ft (130 m)
- 2016: 430 ft (130 m) at Bhilai Steel Plant.

Welding of rails into longer lengths was first introduced around 1893. Welding can be done in a central depot or in the field.

- 1895 Hans Goldschmidt, Thermit welding
- 1935 Charles Cadwell, non-ferrous Thermit welding.
- Electrical rail welding: Flash-butt rail welding Flash welding or Induction rail welding.

== Conical or cylindrical wheels ==
It has long been recognised that conical wheels and rails that are sloped by the same amount follow curves better than cylindrical wheels and vertical rails. A few railways such as Queensland Railways used cylindrical wheels until heavier and faster traffic required a change. Cylindrical wheel treads have to "skid" on track curves so increase both drag and rail and wheel wear. On very straight track a cylindrical wheel tread rolls more freely and does not "hunt". The gauge is narrowed slightly and the flange fillets keep the flanges from rubbing the rails. United States practice is a 1 in 20 cone when new. As the tread wears it approaches an unevenly cylindrical tread, at which time the wheel is trued on a wheel lathe or replaced.

== Manufacturers ==
- ArcelorMittal Steelton, United States
- ArcelorMittal Ostrava, Czech Republic
- ArcelorMittal Gijón, Spain
- ArcelorMittal Huta Katowice, Poland
- ArcelorMittal Rodange, Luxembourg
- British Steel, UK
- Evraz, Pueblo, Colorado, United States
- Evraz, Russia
- JFE Steel, Japan
- Kardemir, Turkey
- Liberty Steel Group, Whyalla, Australia – formerly OneSteel and Arrium
- Metinvest, Ukraine
- Nippon Steel, Japan
- Steel Authority of India, India
- Steel Dynamics, United States
- Voestalpine, Austria

=== Defunct manufacturers ===
- Algoma Steel Company, Canada
- Australian Iron & Steel, Australia
- Barrow Steel Works, England
- Bethlehem Steel, United States
- Călărași steel works, Romania
- Dowlais Ironworks, Wales
- Lackawanna Steel Company, United States
- Sydney Steel Corporation, Canada

== Standards ==
- EN 13674-1 - Railway applications - Track - Rail - Part 1: Vignole railway rails 46 kg/m and above EN 13674-1
- EN 13674-4 - Railway applications - Track - Rail - Part 4: Vignole railway rails from 27 kg/m to, but excluding 46 kg/m EN 13674-4

== See also ==
- Common structural shapes
- Comparison of train and tram tracks
- Hunting oscillation
- History of rail transport
- Permanent way (history)
- Plateway
- Rail lengths
- Rail Squeal
- Rail tracks
- Guide rail § Railway guide rail
- Structural steel
- Tramway track
- Wagonway § Iron rails
