= Charles Cadwell =

Charles Cadwell was an American professor at the Case School of Applied Science (now Case Western Reserve University) in Cleveland, Ohio.

Cadwell further developed the exothermic welding system previously invented by Hans Goldschmidt in 1895; in 1938–1939 Cadwell developed a non-ferrous exothermic welding process using copper, today widely known as "Cadweld". The original use of the process was to weld signal bonds to railroad tracks, which previously had to be done with "pins" knocked into holes drilled into the web of the rail. Later developments allows the rails themselves to be welded together.

== See also ==
- Rail profile
