= Glass run channel =

Groove placed around windows (most commonly car windows) as a seal

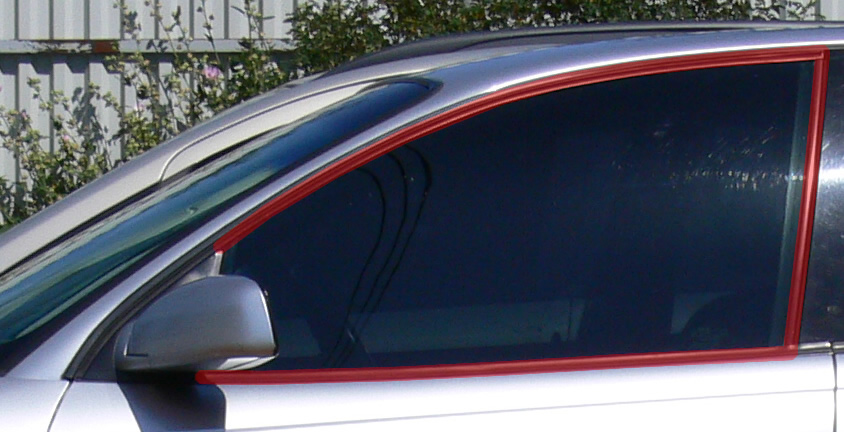
A car with the locations of the glass run channels highlighted in red

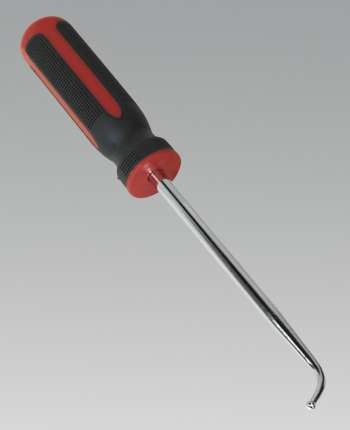
A 250 mm glass run channel cleaner

A glass run channel is a groove, normally made of rubber or plastic, that is found around windows (most commonly car windows). The primary purpose of a glass run channel is to provide a seal for the window.

== Cleaning ==
Due to the channel's narrowness, glass runs can be difficult to clean (or free from small obstructions like glass chips) without the use of a specialised cleaner.

== See also ==
- Automotive weatherstripping
