= Comparison of train and tram tracks =

Differences in train and tram track characteristics

Railways and tramways incorporate track on which rail vehicles travel over two parallel steel beams, called rails. The rails, anchored by a variety of fixtures, in turn support and guide the vehicles' wheels. The vehicles are of two main types: either trains or trams (also termed "light rail vehicles"), the former being much heavier than the latter. This difference necessitates two separate criteria in designing and manufacturing train and tram tracks.

== Rail/wheel configuration ==
The diagram shows typical wheel and rail profiles for tramways (left) and railways (right). The tramway design, which is embedded in the ground, is used when other traffic is present, such as motor vehicles and pedestrians.

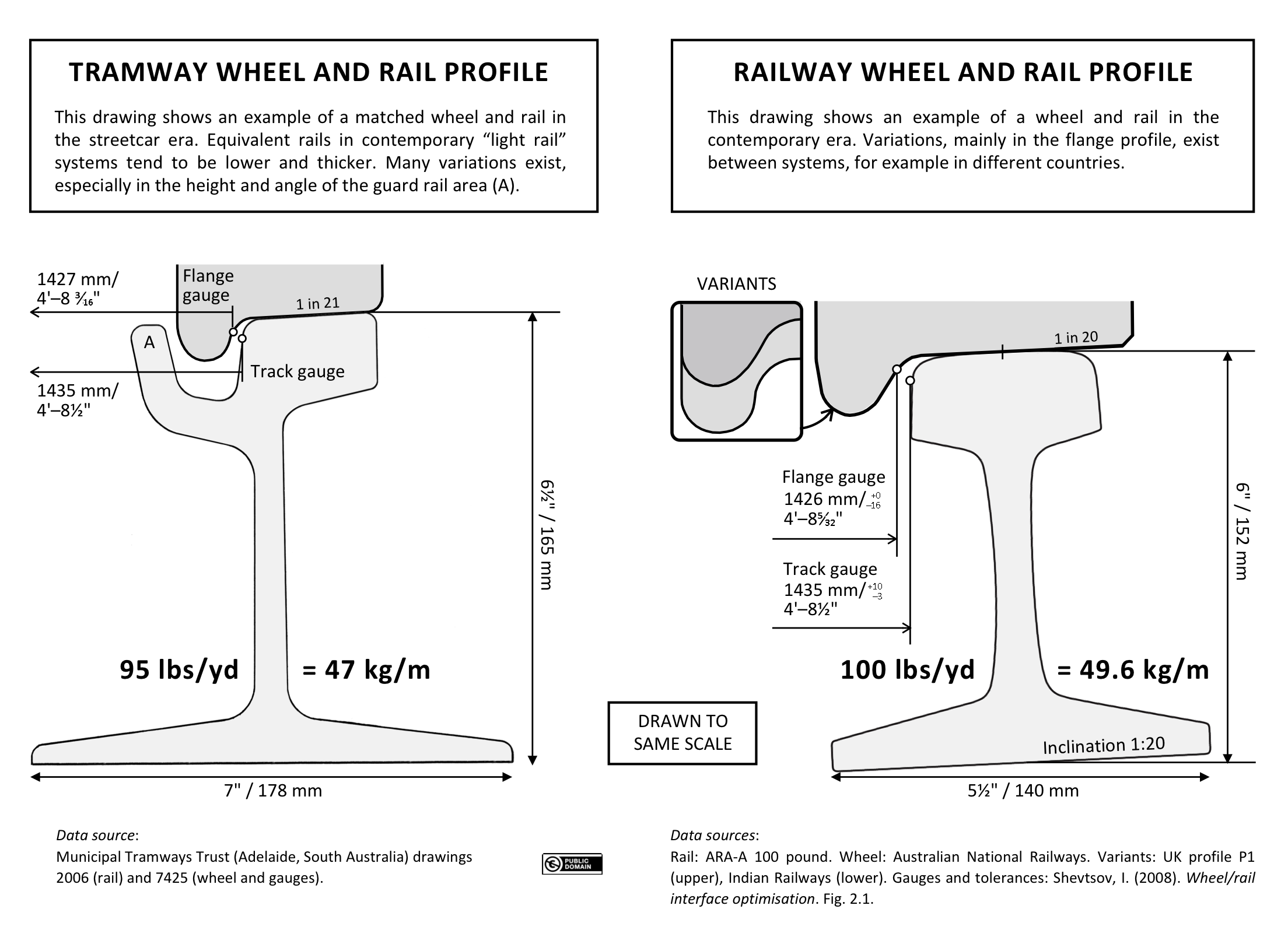
Same-scale drawings of (left) profile of grooved rail for trams or light rail vehicles (used in areas shared with other forms of traffic), and profile of a tram wheel; (right) rail and wheel profiles for railway vehicles

As shown in the diagram, compared to wheels on railway rolling stock, tram wheels have a smaller tread (US: rim) resting on the rail and a smaller flange preventing sideways movement. Coning of the tread is matched by the rail profile (tramways) and inclination of the rail (railways).

Guard rails do not normally come into play
Train and tram wheels have a flange on one side to keep the wheels running on the rails when the limits of the geometry-based alignment are reached, either due to some emergency or defect, or because the curve radius is so small that self-steering normally provided by the coned wheel tread is no longer effective. But in normal running on satisfactory track, the conical geometry of their wheels ensures they stay centred on their tracks without the flanges touching load-bearing rails or guard rails.

When trams (or light rail vehicles in the present era) travel in corridors reserved for them, it is usual for them to run on track configured the same as on railways, as in the right-hand diagram, the only difference being:

- in the case of wheels, the smaller profile
- in the case of rails, a smaller gap ("flangeway") between the load-bearing rail and a guard rail at crossings.

The photo shows the configuration where wheel flanges go through flangeways at a crossing in a railroad switch or turnout (top left) and are constrained during the process by a guard rail (right) that acts on the back of the flange. In both cases, flanges on rail vehicles require wider flangeways than those on light rail vehicles. This factor militates against the widespread use of common track for trains and trams. However, it is possible to find an optimal combination of both rail and wheel profiles, and positioning of rails, when dealing with a closed railway system, i.e. when only one type of rolling stock is running on a track and no influence of other types of railway vehicles is present. An example of such a closed system is the Rotterdam Metro network in The Netherlands.

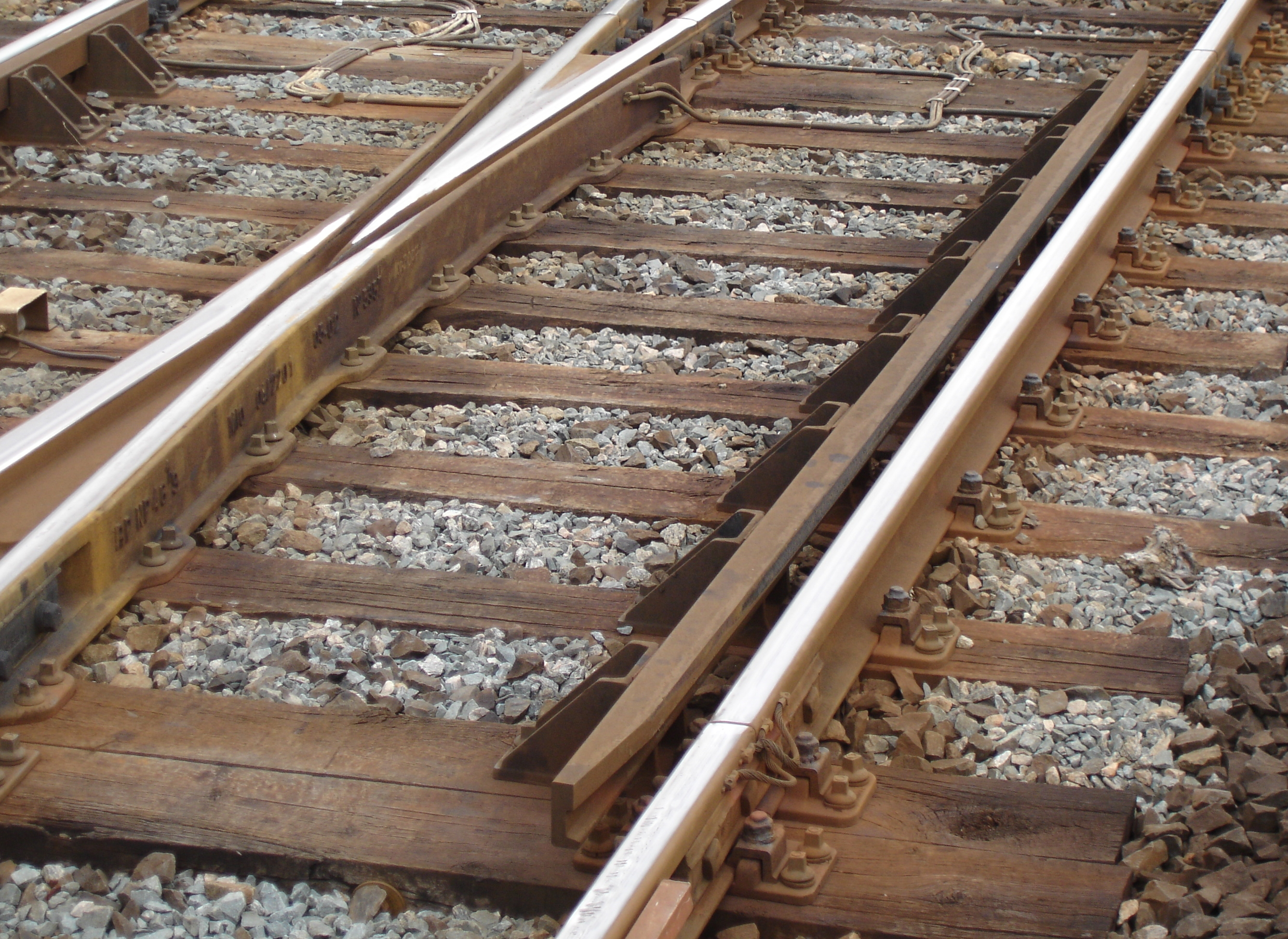
By constraining the back of a wheel flange passing through, the guard rail at right prevents the opposite wheel from derailing on the common crossing at the left

== See also ==
- Railway track
- Tramway track
- Wheelset
- Wheel gauge
