= Groove (engineering) =

Long and narrow indentation in a part/material, usually for other parts to fit into

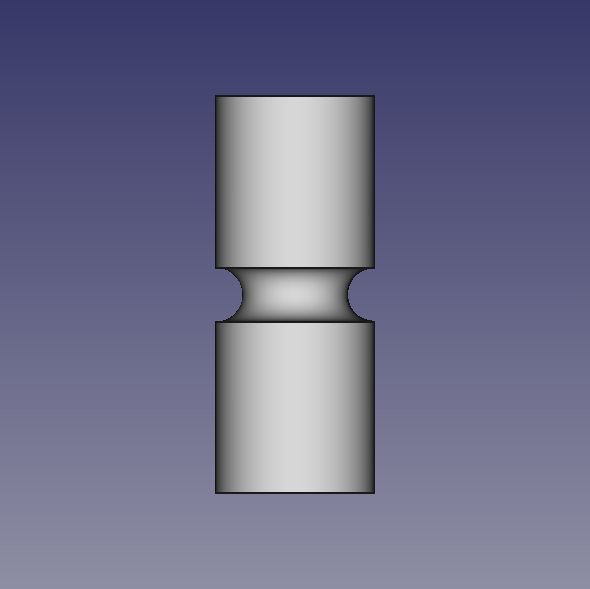
Groove on a cylinder

In manufacturing or mechanical engineering a groove is a long and narrow indentation built into a material, generally for the purpose of allowing another material or part to move within the groove and be guided by it. Examples include:

1. A canal cut in a hard material, usually metal. This canal can be round, oval or an arc in order to receive another component such as a boss, a tongue or a gasket. It can also be on the circumference of a dowel, a bolt, an axle or on the outside or inside of a tube or pipe etc. This canal may receive a circlip, an o-ring, or a gasket.
2. A depression on the entire circumference of a cast or machined wheel, a pulley or sheave. This depression may receive a cable, a rope or a belt.
3. A longitudinal channel formed in a hot rolled rail profile such as a grooved rail. This groove is for the flange on a train wheel.

Grooves were used by ancient Roman engineers to survey land.

== See also ==
- Fluting (architecture)
- Gland (engineering)
- Glass run channel
- Groove (joinery)
- Grooved rail
- Labyrinth seal
- Ridge
- Tongue and groove
- Tread
