= Alphonse Loubat =

French inventor of improved tram and rail equipment (1799–1866)

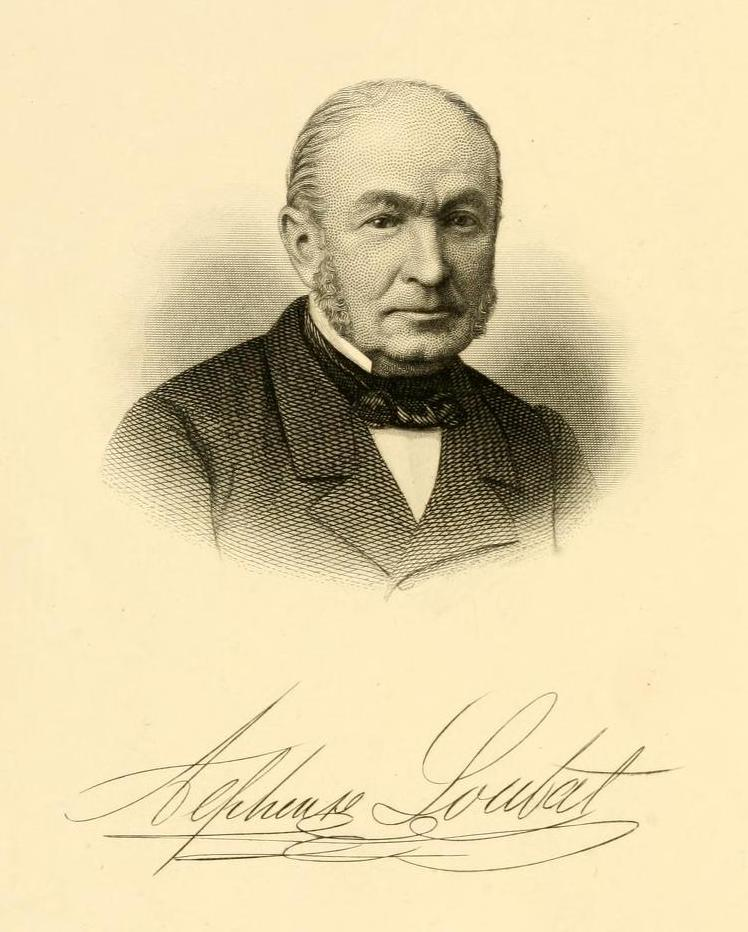
Alphonse Loubat

Alphonse Loubat (15 June 1799 – 10 September 1866) was a French inventor who developed improvements in tram and rail equipment, and helped develop tram lines in New York City and Paris.

Loubat was born in Sainte-Livrade-sur-Lot. He went to New York City in 1827 where he helped develop that city's first tramway in 1832. He returned to France and in 1852 developed the grooved rail, which greatly facilitated street railways and tramlines. Besides he planted wine in Brooklin and wrote on wine.

He died in Ville-d'Avray. Joseph Florimond Loubat was his son.
