= Exothermic welding =

Using pyrotechnic metal to join two metal pieces together

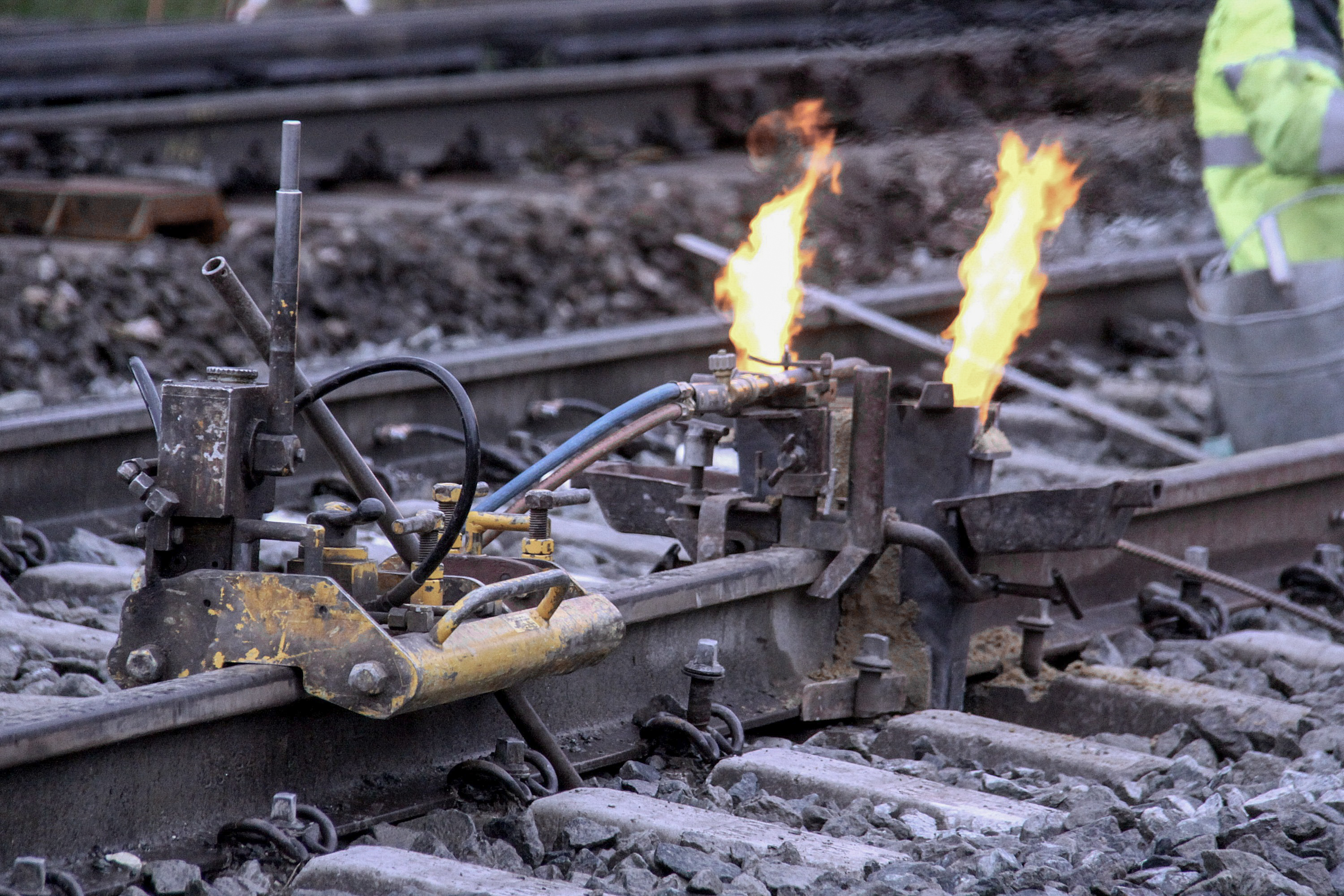
A thermite weld in progress

Exothermic welding, also known as exothermic bonding and thermite welding (TW), is a welding process that employs molten metal to permanently join the conductors. The process employs an exothermic reaction of a thermite composition to heat the metal, and requires no external source of heat or current. The chemical reaction that produces the heat is an aluminothermic reaction between aluminium powder and a metal oxide.

== Overview ==
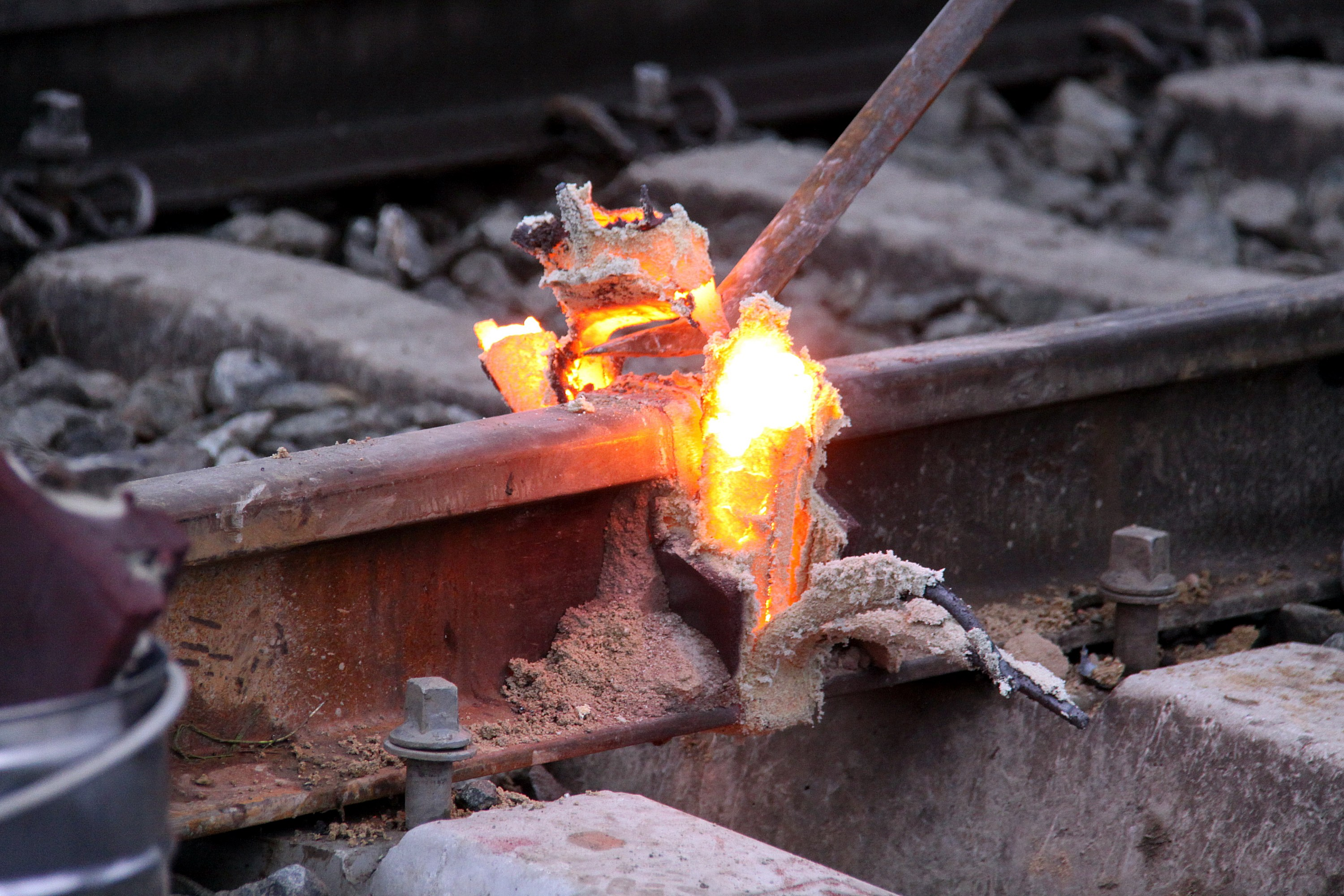
A recent thermite weld

In exothermic welding, aluminium dust reduces the oxide of another metal, most commonly iron oxide, because aluminium is highly reactive. Iron(III) oxide is commonly used:

$$\mathrm{Fe_2O_3 + 2 \ Al \longrightarrow 2 \ Fe + Al_2O_3}$$

The products are aluminium oxide, free elemental iron, and a large amount of heat. The reactants are commonly powdered and mixed with a binder to keep the material solid and prevent separation.

Commonly the reacting composition is five parts iron oxide red (rust) powder and three parts aluminium powder by weight, ignited at high temperatures. A strongly exothermic (heat-generating) reaction occurs that via reduction and oxidation produces a white hot mass of molten iron and a slag of refractory aluminium oxide. The molten iron is the actual welding material; the aluminium oxide is much less dense than the liquid iron and so floats to the top of the reaction, so the set-up for welding must take into account that the actual molten metal is at the bottom of the crucible and covered by floating slag.

Other metal oxides can be used, such as chromium oxide, to generate the given metal in its elemental form. Copper thermite, using copper oxide, is used for creating electric joints:

$$\mathrm{3 \ Cu_2O + 2 Al \longrightarrow 6 \ Cu + Al_2O_3}$$

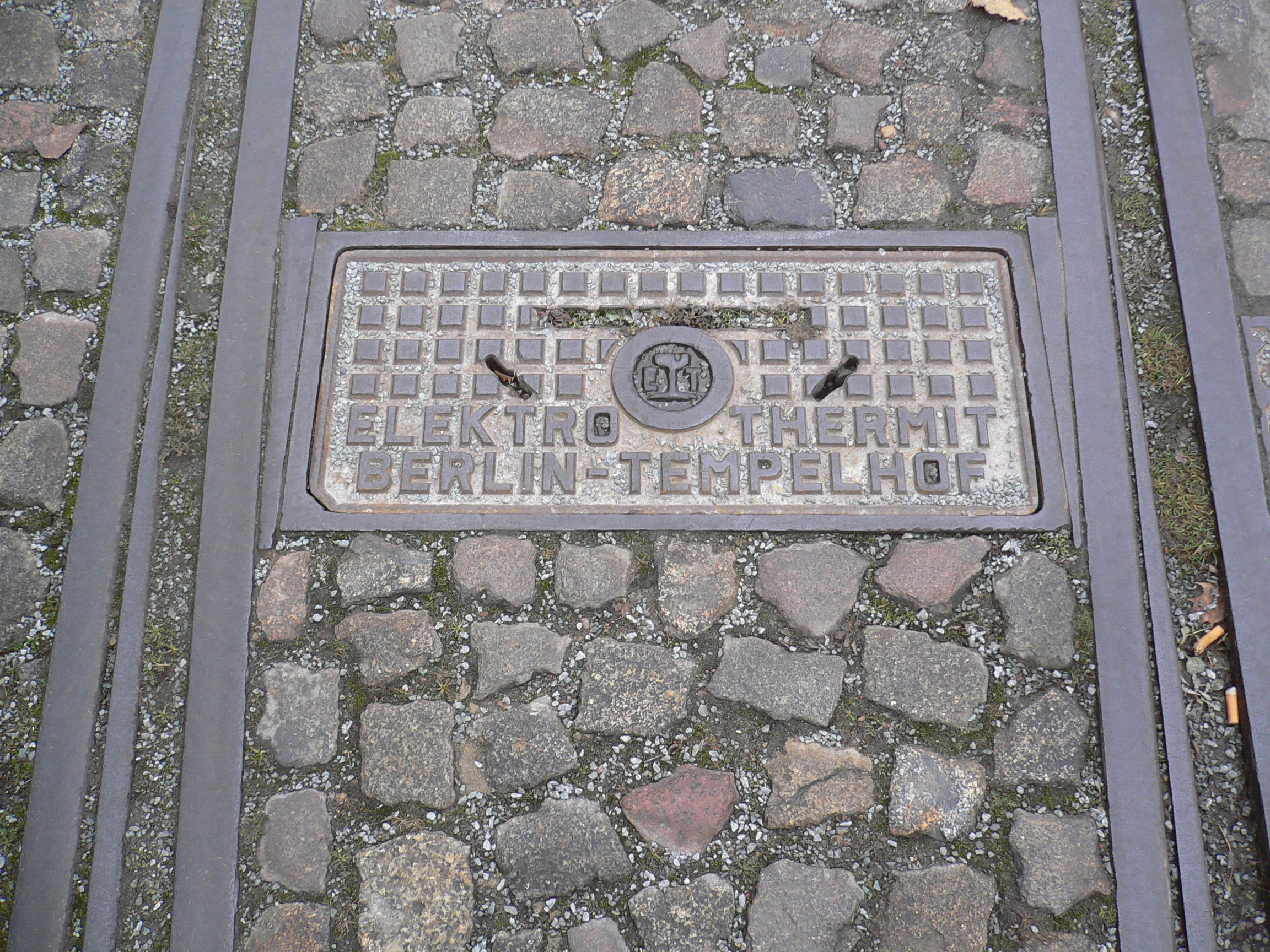
Thermite welding was a step forward for joining rails.

Thermite welding is widely used to weld railway rails. One of the first railroads to evaluate the use of thermite welding was the Delaware and Hudson Railroad in the United States in 1935 The weld quality of chemically pure thermite is low due to the low heat penetration into the joining metals and the very low carbon and alloy content in the nearly pure molten iron. To obtain sound railroad welds, the ends of the rails being thermite welded are preheated with a torch to an orange heat, to ensure the molten steel is not chilled during the pour.

Because the thermite reaction yields relatively pure iron, not the much stronger steel, some small pellets or rods of high-carbon alloying metal are included in the thermite mix; these alloying materials melt from the heat of the thermite reaction and mix into the weld metal. The alloying beads composition will vary, according to the rail alloy being welded.

The reaction reaches very high temperatures, depending on the metal oxide used. The reactants are usually supplied in the form of powders, with the reaction triggered using a spark from a flint lighter. The activation energy for this reaction is very high however, and initiation requires either the use of a "booster" material such as powdered magnesium metal or a very hot flame source. The aluminium oxide slag that it produces is discarded.

When welding copper conductors, the process employs a semi-permanent graphite crucible mould, in which the molten copper, produced by the reaction, flows through the mould and over and around the conductors to be welded, forming an electrically conductive weld between them. When the copper cools, the mould is either broken off or left in place. Alternatively, hand-held graphite crucibles can be used. The advantages of these crucibles include portability, lower cost (because they can be reused), and flexibility, especially in field applications.

== Properties ==
An exothermic weld has higher mechanical strength than other forms of weld, and excellent corrosion resistance It is also highly stable when subject to repeated short-circuit pulses, and does not suffer from increased electrical resistance over the lifetime of the installation. However, the process is costly relative to other welding processes, requires a supply of replaceable moulds, suffers from a lack of repeatability, and can be impeded by wet conditions or bad weather (when performed outdoors).

== Applications ==
Exothermic welding is usually used for welding copper conductors but is suitable for welding a wide range of metals, including stainless steel, cast iron, common steel, brass, bronze, and Monel. It is especially useful for joining dissimilar metals. The process is marketed under a variety of names such as AIWeld, American Rail Weld, AmiableWeld, Ardo Weld, ERICO Cadweld, FurseWeld, Harger Ultrashot, Quikweld, StaticWeld, Techweld, Tectoweld, TerraWeld, Thermoweld and Ultraweld.

Because of the good electrical conductivity and high stability in the face of short-circuit pulses, exothermic welds are one of the options specified by §250.7 of the United States National Electrical Code for grounding conductors and bonding jumpers. It is the preferred method of bonding, and indeed it is the only acceptable means of bonding copper to galvanized cable. The NEC does not require such exothermically welded connections to be listed or labelled, but some engineering specifications require that completed exothermic welds be examined using X-ray equipment.

=== Rail welding ===
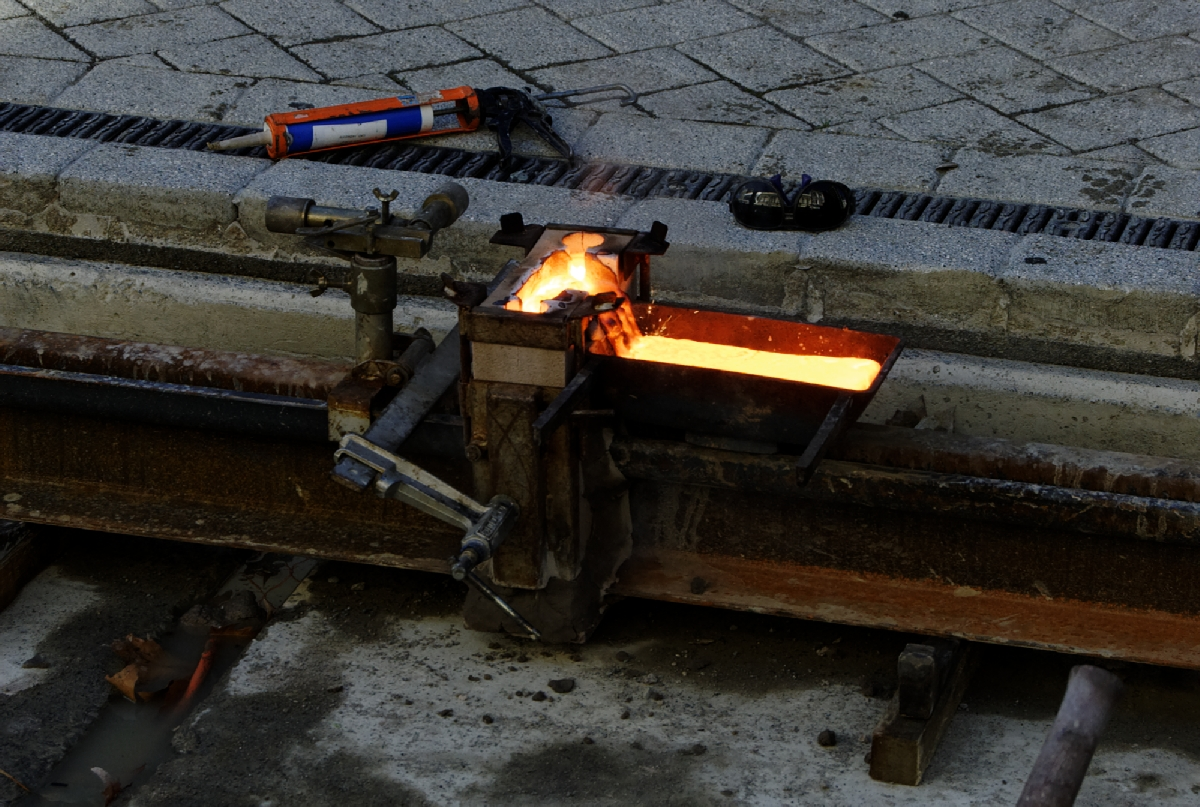
Tram tracks being joined

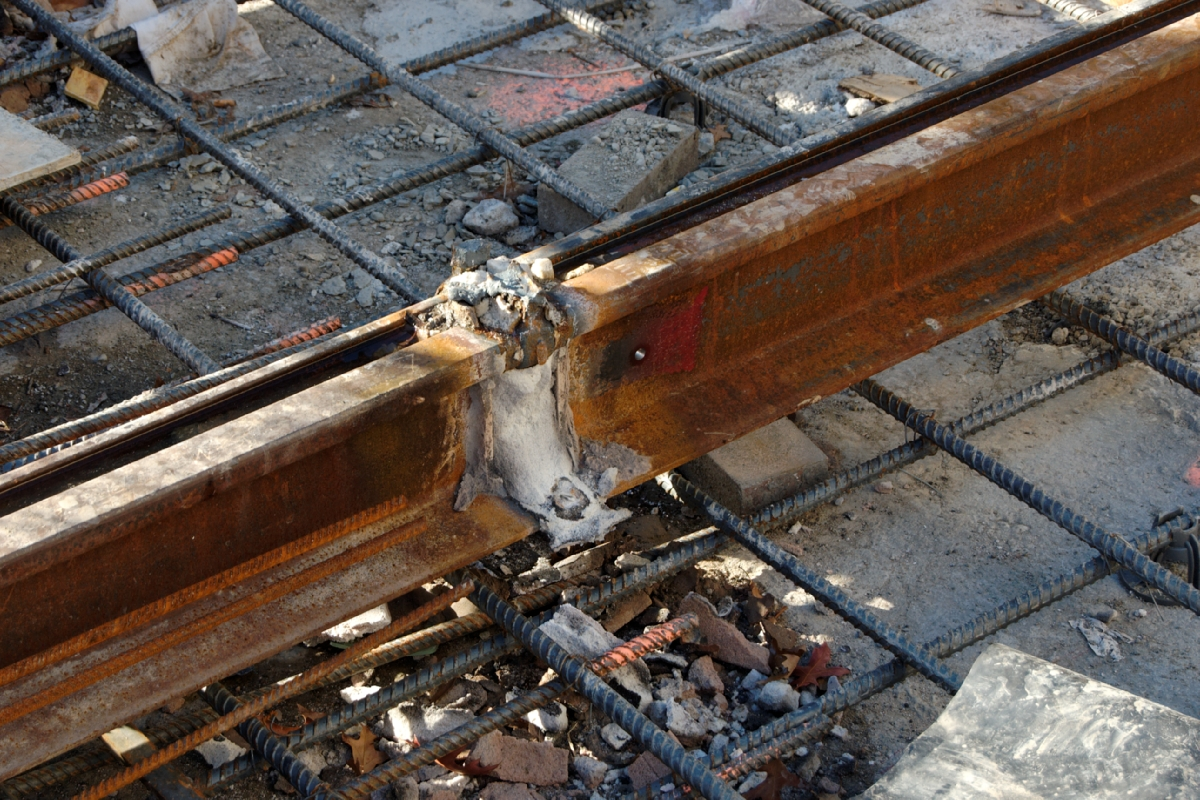
Tram tracks recently joined

==== History ====
Modern thermite rail welding was first developed by Hans Goldschmidt in the mid-1890s as another application for the thermite reaction which he was initially exploring for the use of producing high-purity chromium and manganese. The first rail line was welded using the process in Essen, Germany in 1899, and thermite welded rails gained popularity as they had the advantage of greater reliability with the additional wear placed on rails by new electric and high speed rail systems. Some of the earliest adopters of the process were the cities of Dresden, Leeds, and Singapore. In 1904 Goldschmidt established his eponymous Goldschmidt Thermit Company (known by that name today) in New York City to bring the practice to railways in North America.

In 1904, George E. Pellissier, an engineering student at Worcester Polytechnic Institute who had been following Goldschmidt's work, reached out to the new company as well as the Holyoke Street Railway in Massachusetts. Pellissier oversaw the first installation of track in the United States using this process on August 8, 1904, and went on to improve upon it further for both the railway and Goldschmidt's company as an engineer and superintendent, including early developments in continuous welded rail processes that allowed the entirety of each rail to be joined rather than the foot and web alone. Although not all rail welds are completed using the thermite process, it still remains a standard operating procedure throughout the world.

==== Process ====
Typically, the ends of the rails are cleaned, aligned flat and true, and spaced apart 25 mm (1 in). This gap between rail ends for welding is to ensure consistent results in the pouring of the molten steel into the weld mold. In the event of a welding failure, the rail ends can be cropped to a 75 mm (3 in) gap, removing the melted and damaged rail ends, and a new weld attempted with a special mould and larger thermite charge. A two or three piece hardened sand mould is clamped around the rail ends, and a torch of suitable heat capacity is used to preheat the ends of the rail and the interior of the mould.

The proper amount of thermite with alloying metal is placed in a refractory crucible, and when the rails have reached a sufficient temperature, the thermite is ignited and allowed to react to completion (allowing time for any alloying metal to fully melt and mix, yielding the desired molten steel or alloy). The reaction crucible is then tapped at the bottom. Modern crucibles have a self-tapping thimble in the pouring nozzle. The molten steel flows into the mould, fusing with the rail ends and forming the weld.

The slag, being lighter than the steel, flows last from the crucible and overflows the mould into a steel catch basin, to be disposed of after cooling. The entire setup is allowed to cool. The mould is removed and the weld is cleaned by hot chiselling and grinding to produce a smooth joint. Typical time from start of the work until a train can run over the rail is approximately 45 minutes to more than an hour, depending on the rail size and ambient temperature. In any case, the rail steel must be cooled to less than 370 °C (700 °F) before it can sustain the weight of rail locomotives.

When a thermite process is used for track circuits – the bonding of wires to the rails with a copper alloy, a graphite mould is used. The graphite mould is reusable many times, because the copper alloy is not as hot as the steel alloys used in rail welding. In signal bonding, the volume of molten copper is quite small, approximately 2 cm^{3} (0.1 cu in) and the mould is lightly clamped to the side of the rail, also holding a signal wire in place. In rail welding, the weld charge can weigh up to 13 kg (29 lb).

The hardened sand mould is heavy and bulky, must be securely clamped in a very specific position and then subjected to intense heat for several minutes before firing the charge. When rail is welded into long strings, the longitudinal expansion and contraction of steel must be taken into account. British practice sometimes uses a sliding joint of some sort at the end of long runs of continuously welded rail, to allow some movement, although by using a heavy concrete sleeper and an extra amount of ballast at the sleeper ends, the track, which will be prestressed according to the ambient temperature at the time of its installation, will develop compressive stress in hot ambient temperature, or tensile stress in cold ambient temperature, its strong attachment to the heavy sleepers preventing sun kink (buckling) or other deformation.

Current practice is to use welded rails throughout on high speed lines, and expansion joints are kept to a minimum, often only to protect junctions and crossings from excessive stress. American practice appears to be very similar, a straightforward physical restraint of the rail. The rail is prestressed, or considered "stress neutral" at some particular ambient temperature. This "neutral" temperature will vary according to local climate conditions, taking into account lowest winter and warmest summer temperatures.

The rail is physically secured to the ties or sleepers with rail anchors, or anti-creepers. If the track ballast is good and clean and the ties are in good condition, and the track geometry is good, then the welded rail will withstand ambient temperature swings normal to the region.

=== Remote welding ===
Remote exothermic welding is a type of exothermic welding process for joining two electrical conductors from a distance. The process reduces the inherent risks associated with exothermic welding and is used in installations that require a welding operator to permanently join conductors a safe distance from the superheated copper alloy.

The process incorporates either an igniter for use with standard graphite molds or a consumable sealed drop-in weld metal cartridge, semi-permanent graphite crucible mold, and an ignition source that tethers to the cartridge with a cable that provides the safe remote ignition.

== See also ==
- Rail lengths
