= Vehicle glass =

Windows of an automobile

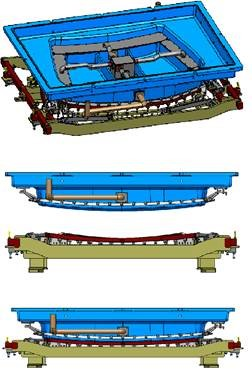
Glass press production mould tool

Vehicle glass is glass used to provide light access to motor vehicles. It includes windscreens, side and rear windows (including quarter glass and opera windows) and glass panel roofs such as sunroofs.

Vehicle glass is generally held in place by glass run channels, which also serve to contain fragments of glass if the glass breaks.

Back glass is also called rear window glass, rear windshield, back shield, or rear glass. It is the piece of glass opposite the windshield. Back glass is made from tempered glass, also known as safety glass, and when broken shatters into small, round pieces. Windshields are made of laminated glass, which consists of two layers of glass, separated by a vinyl sheet.

Vehicle glass may contain heating coils or antennae.

== Repair ==
Windscreens can be repaired after chips or cracks damage the outer windscreen layer but do not damage the PVB or inner layer. Crack repair depends upon the size, position, type, and depth of crack. In most cases cracks up to 2 inches (5.1 cm) are repairable.

Local laws vary regarding safe windscreen repair.

Windscreen repair requires clearing the impact area and removing air through vacuum creation. A transparent fluid is used to fill the crack. The fluid is than treated with UV light to chemically solidify the fluid. Professional repairs can achieve clarity up to 95% with complete structural integrity.

== Replacement ==
Vehicle glass other than the windshield shatters on impact and hence needs replacement. Most vehicle body glass is not bonded and does not require adhesive for installation. Windscreens, sunroofs and rear window glass are generally bonded. They require adhesive to bond the glass with the vehicle frame.

US Federal Motor Vehicle Safety Standard 212/208 ensures reliability of adhesives used in US vehicles. For a bonded glass, replacement can take up to an hour. Time must be allowed to allow the adhesive to cure. This is known as "Safe Drive Away Time" or "Minimum Drive Away Time".

== See also ==
- Automotive head-up display
- Automotive engineering
- Glass production
- History of glass
