= Composite glass =

Composite glass is the collective term for a laminate having at least two glass panes which are in each case connected by means of an adhesive intermediate layer composed of plastic, e.g. by means of a casting resin or a thermoplastic composite film, which is highly tear-resistant and is viscoelastic. Composite glass should not be confused with composite windows.

== Applications ==
Windscreens of all kinds of vehicles as well as crash-proof glazing or pavement light used in the construction sector are part of the main fields of application. The composite film used mostly in the construction and automotive sectors is composed of polyvinyl butyral (PVB). Other customary intermediate layer materials include ethylene-vinyl acetate (EVA), polyacrylate (PA), poly(methyl methacrylate) (PMMA), polyurethane (PUR), etc.

Depending on the number, type and thickness of the glass panes used and intermediate layers, composite glasses are used as safety glass, sound-proof glass, fireproof glass, as well as throw-through-resistant, breakthrough-resistant or ballistic-resistant glass etc. Glazing which is particularly resistant is produced by means of a combination of glass panes having one or a plurality of panes made from polycarbonate. Smart glasses are also often manufactured as composite glass.

Since 2006, in accordance with the latest results coming from research, films between glass, which are provided by means of PVB, EVA or TPU as well as LED and SMD electronics mentioned above, are laminated whereby even products such as luminous glass stairways and tables as well as other composite safety glass systems are made possible.

Recently, scientists in Queensland, Australia have developed composite glass that gives phones an 'unbreakable' screen. This breakthrough could enhance the knowledge of composite glass as we know it.

== Examples ==
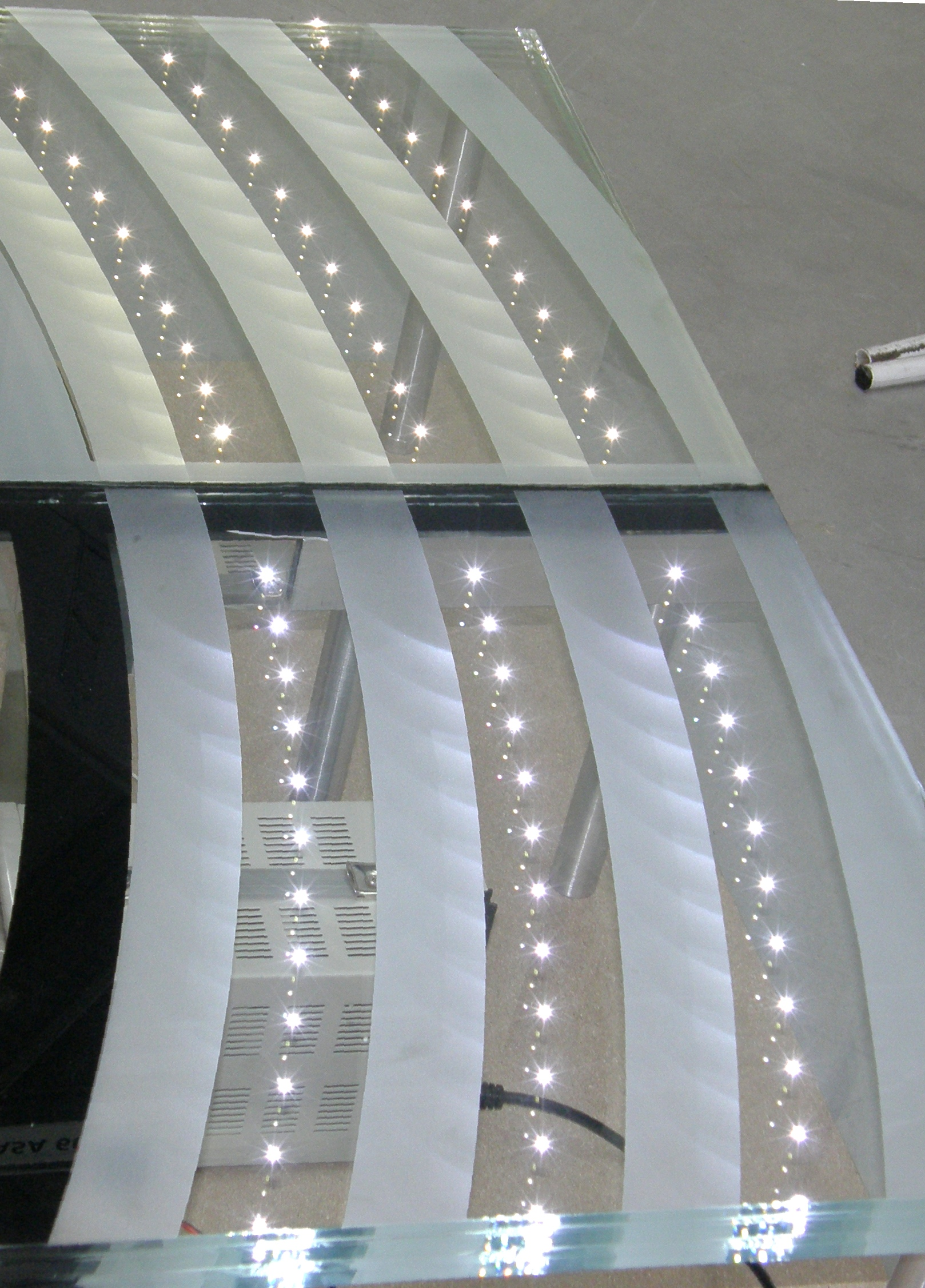

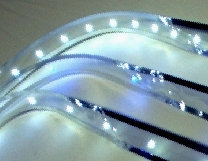

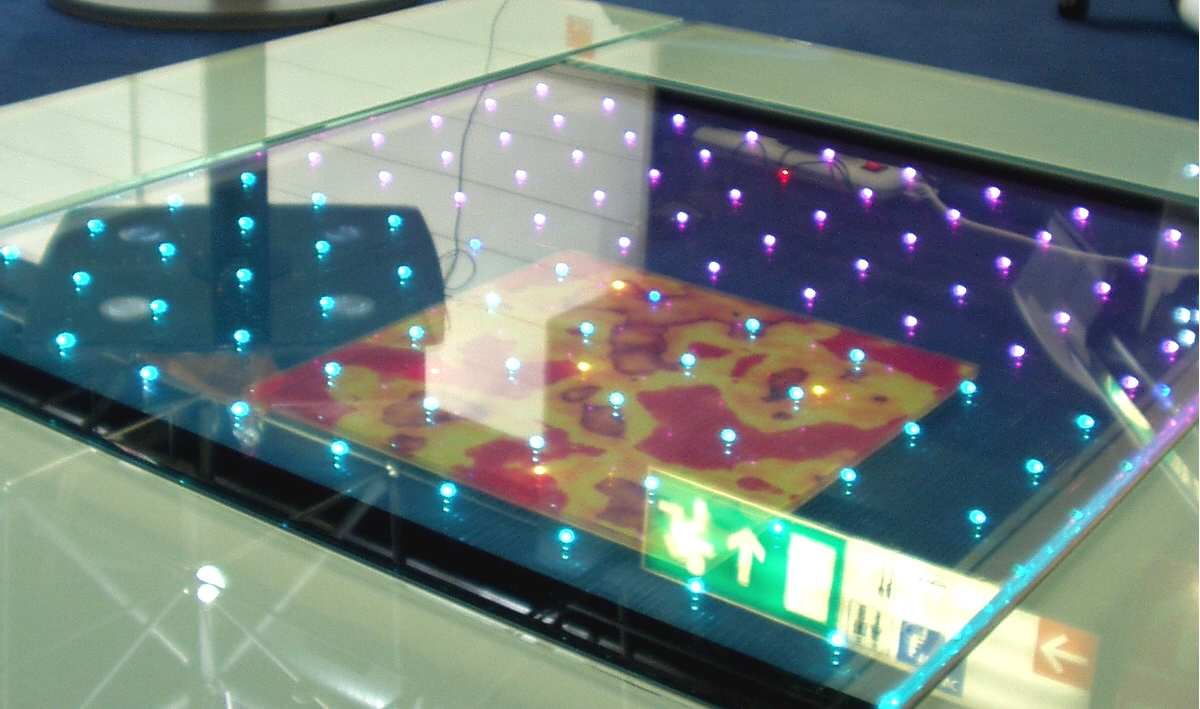

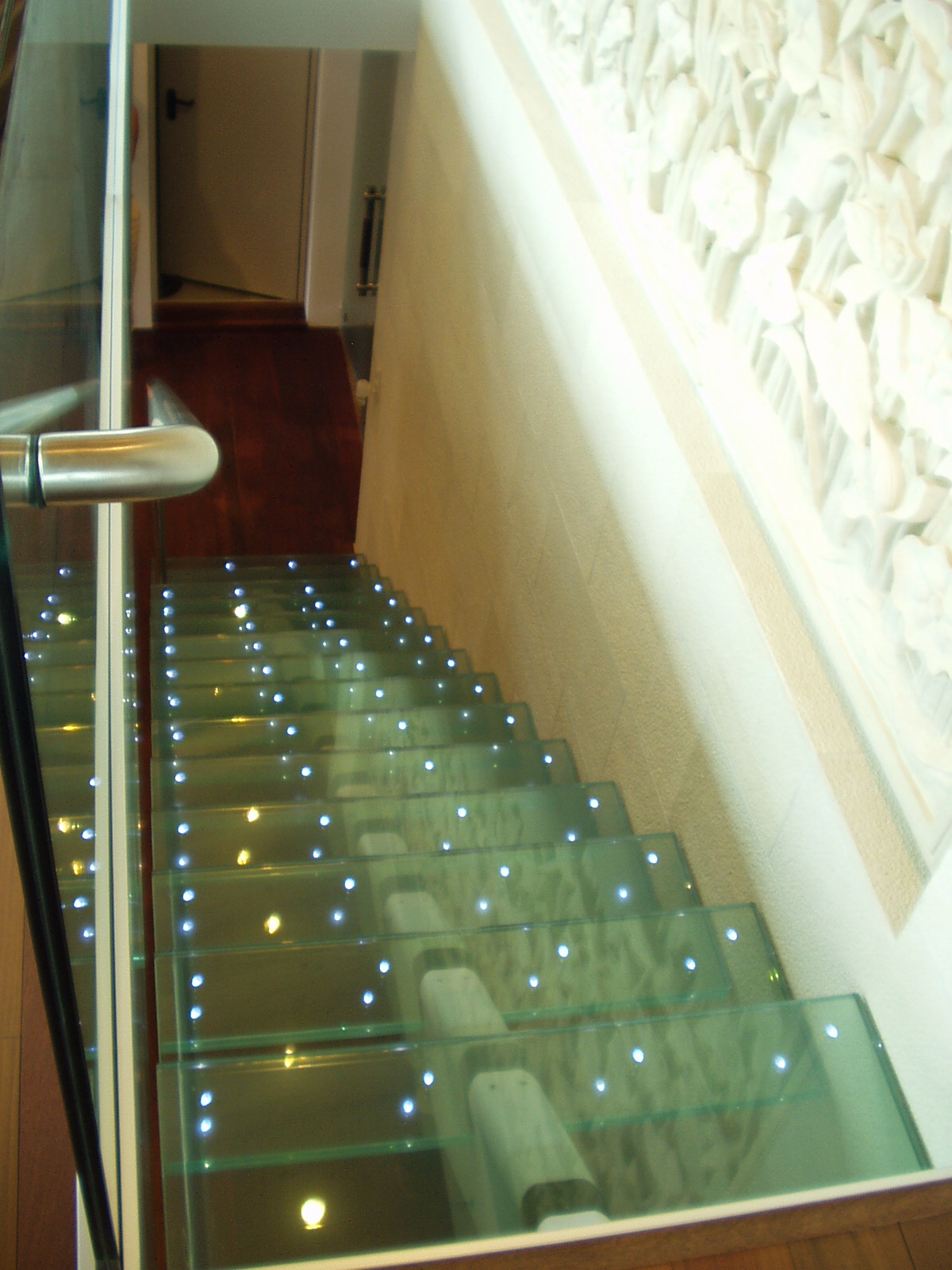

The so-called "pummel test" inter alia is used to control the quality of composite glass.

== See also ==
- Laminated glass

== Reference list ==
2. Australian Broadcasting Company (ABC) News "Composite glass breakthrough by Queensland researchers could help make phone screens 'unbreakable'"
