= Car door =

Type of door, typically hinged to the body of a car

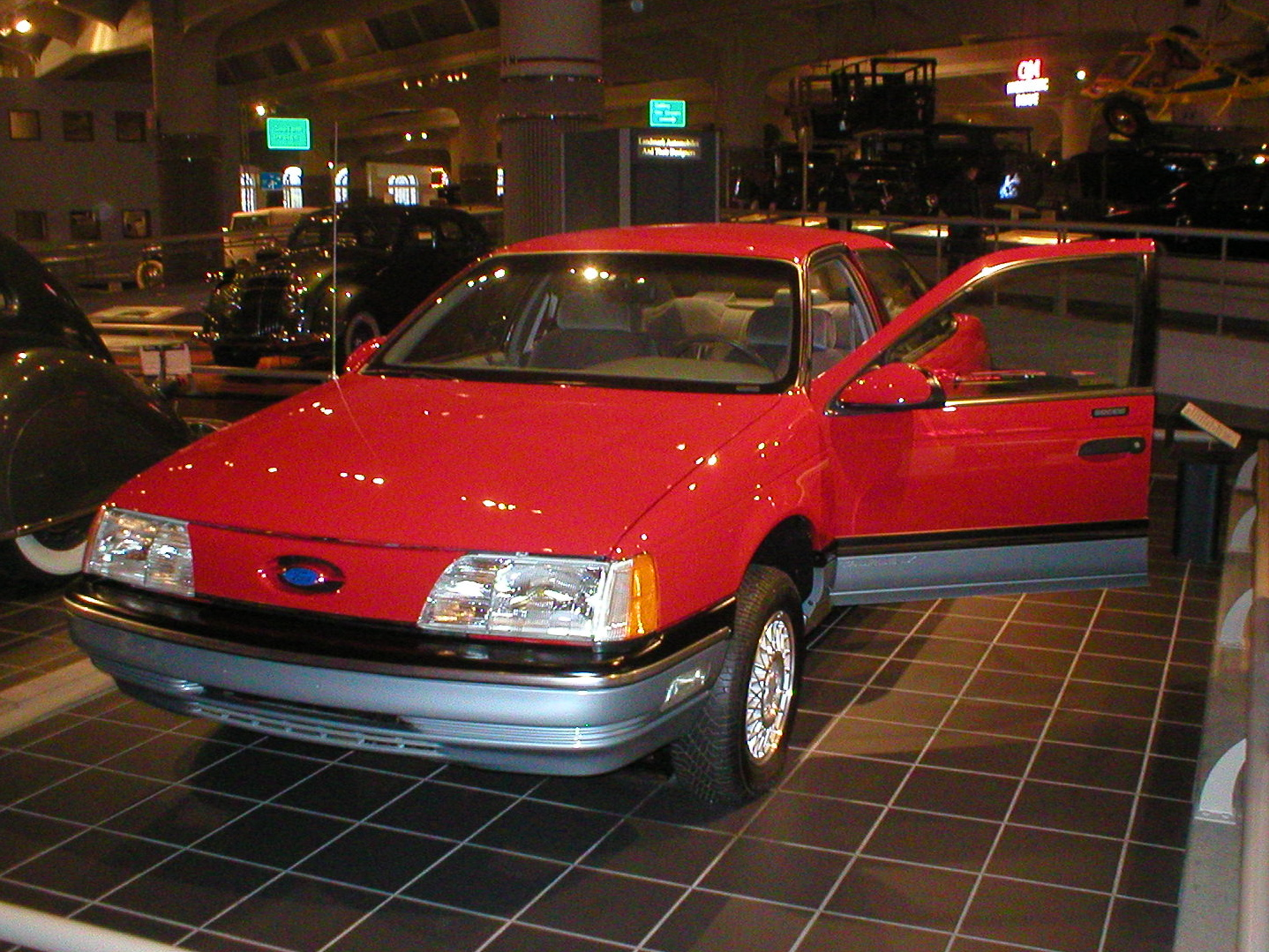
Exterior side of car door on a 1986 Ford Taurus

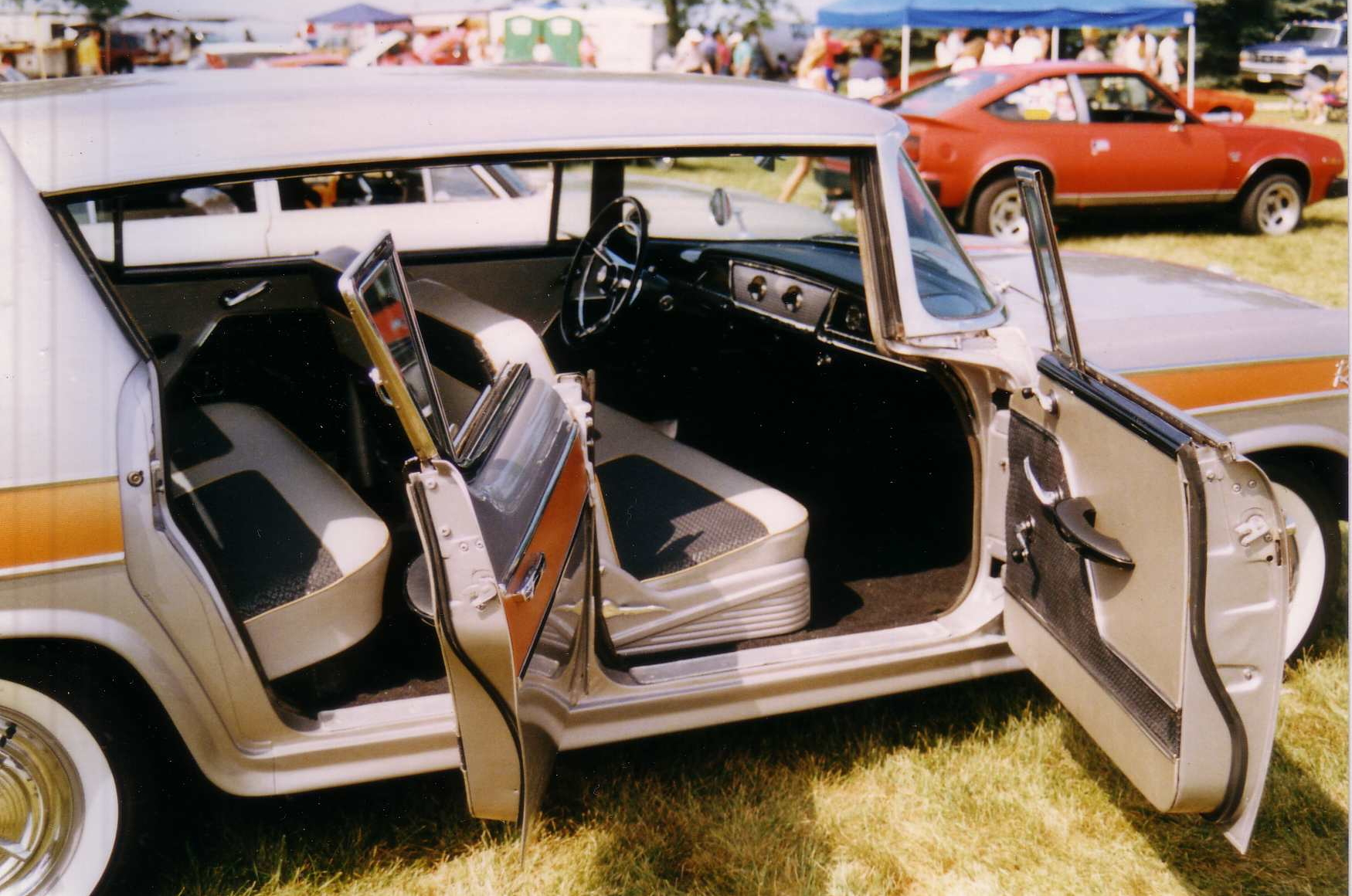
Opened front and rear doors on a 1957 Rambler Rebel

A car door is a type of door opening, typically hinged on its front edge, but sometimes attached by other mechanisms such as tracks, for entering and exiting a vehicle. Doors most often integrate side windows for visibility from inside the car and can be locked to secure the vehicle.

Car doors may be manually operated or with power assist supplied by the vehicle. Powered doors or power doors may be found on minivans, luxury vehicles, or modified cars.

== General design ==
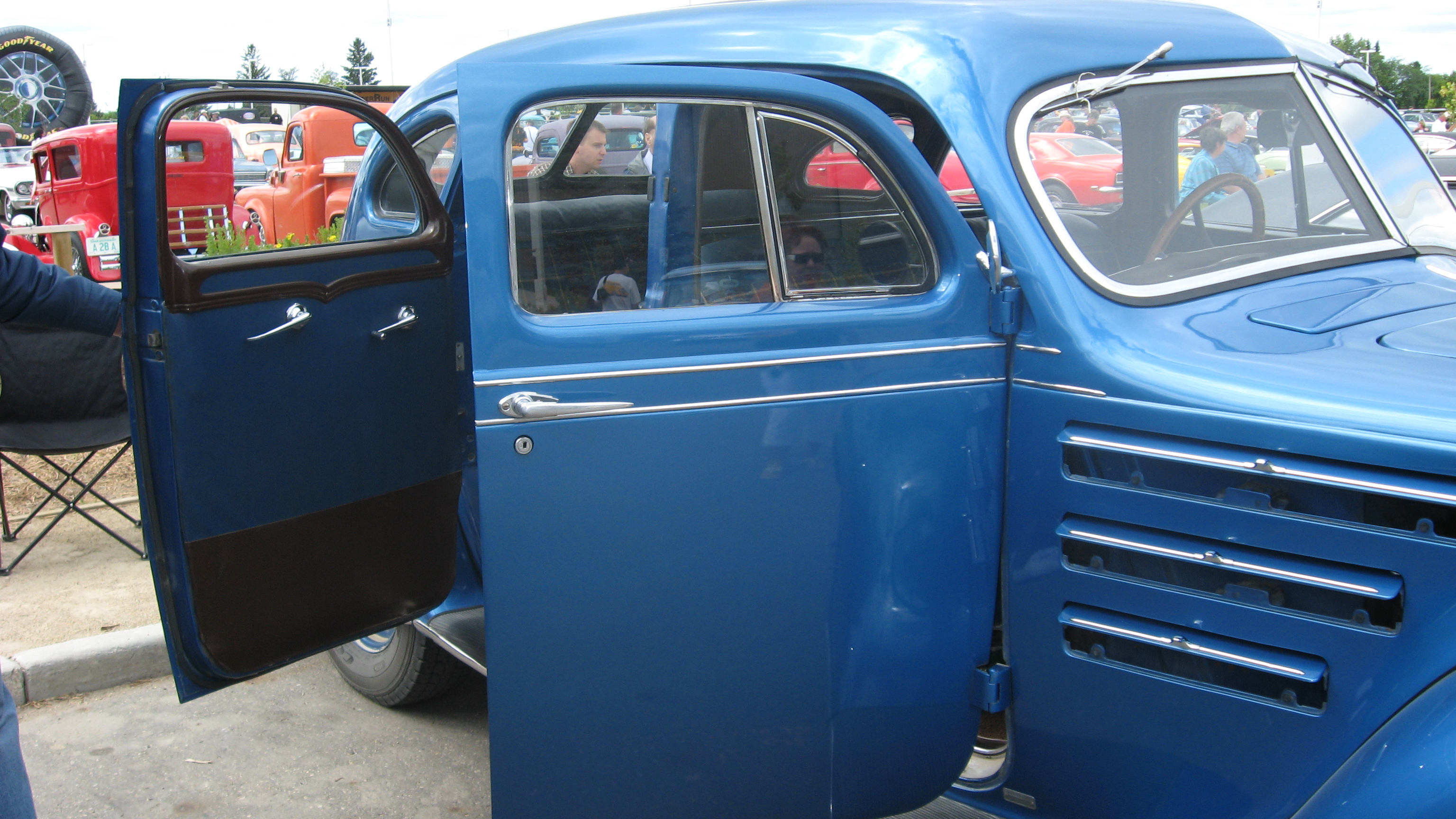
Open doors on a Chrysler Airflow

Car doors are designed to facilitate ingress and egress by car passengers.

Unlike other types of doors, the exterior side of the vehicle door contrasts in its design and finish from its interior side (the interior part is typically equipped with a door card (in British English) or a door panel (in American English) that has decorative and functional features.

The exterior side of the door is designed of steel or other material like the rest of the vehicle's exterior. In addition, its decorative appearance, typically colored with a design, is intended to match with the rest of the vehicle's exterior, the central purpose being to add to the overall aesthetic appeal of the vehicle exterior.

A vehicle typically has two types of doors: front doors and rear doors. Loosely related are: vehicle hoods and vehicle trunk lids. There are also doors known as a "hatch" (see "door categorization" below).67

== Parts ==
- Door card
- Door handle
- Door switch
- Glass window
- Pillar
- Power door locks, which can work on a remote system
- Interior storage compartment

=== Door locks and latches ===
Most vehicle doors are secured closed to the vehicle body with latches that may be locked to prevent unauthorized access from the exterior. There are a variety of car door locking systems. Door locks may be manually, or automatically operated, and may be centrally or individually operated. Also, they may be operated by remote control, with the transmitter often integrated into the main vehicle access and a key for the ignition.

Additionally, rear passenger doors are frequently fitted with child safety locks to prevent children from exiting the vehicle unless the door is opened from the exterior. These are also frequently used on police cars, to prevent suspect criminals from escaping whilst in police custody.

Vehicle door latches on practically all vehicles today are usually operated by use of a handle which requires the user to pull, lift, or tug—with some force towards themselves—rather than push. There is a reason for this. As late as the 1970s, some vehicles used exposed push buttons to operate the door latch, such as certain Opel models. The unfortunate side effect of this design was that external objects which touched a vehicle during a high-speed spinout could trigger the latch; the door would pop open and centrifugal force would eject any unrestrained vehicle occupants. A death that occurred exactly that way led to the landmark legal case of Daly v. General Motors Corp., 20 Cal. 3d 725 (1978), in which the Supreme Court of California merged strict product liability with comparative fault. The court affirmed the right of General Motors to introduce evidence that decedent Kirk Daly flew out of his Opel not only because the door popped open, but because he was intoxicated and not wearing a seat belt—but in the same opinion, reversed and remanded for retrial because the jury had not been instructed on the then-rapidly developing doctrine of comparative fault and there was a high risk that the jury may have improperly applied the doctrine of contributory negligence to treat such inflammatory evidence of the decedent's negligence as a complete defense.

=== Door switch ===
Door switches are simple on/off mechanisms connected to the interior light (dome light), and may also be connected to a warning light, speaker, or other devices, to inform the driver when the door is not closed. The door light is standard equipment on all cars. In American cars from the 1950s-1990s, they had buzzers or "door dingers" that sounded, along with the check light, whenever any door is open.

=== Windows ===
Most vehicle doors have windows, and most of these may be opened to various extents. Most car door windows retract downwards into the body of the doors and are opened either with a manual crank, or switchable electrical motor (electric car windows other than the driver's window can usually be controlled at both the door itself and centrally by an additional control at the driver's position). In the past, certain retracting windows were operated by direct (up or down) pressure, and were held in the up position by friction instead of by an internal lift mechanism.

Other cars, particularly older US-manufactured vans, have hinged windows with a folded lever mechanism to push and hold the window out from its closed position.

=== Door brakes or stays ===
Vehicle doors often include brakes, or 'stays', that slow the door down just before it closes, and also prevent the door from opening further than its design specification. The current trend is to have a three-stage door brake.

Door brakes exist because the doors on the first vehicles were heavy, so they had to be pushed hard to make them close. Soon after, automotive manufacturers managed to construct lighter doors, but users were used to closing doors with significant force; therefore doors could become damaged. Door brakes were then introduced to slow down the door just before the door closed to prevent damage; these soon became standard.

== Hatchback doors and number of doors designation ==
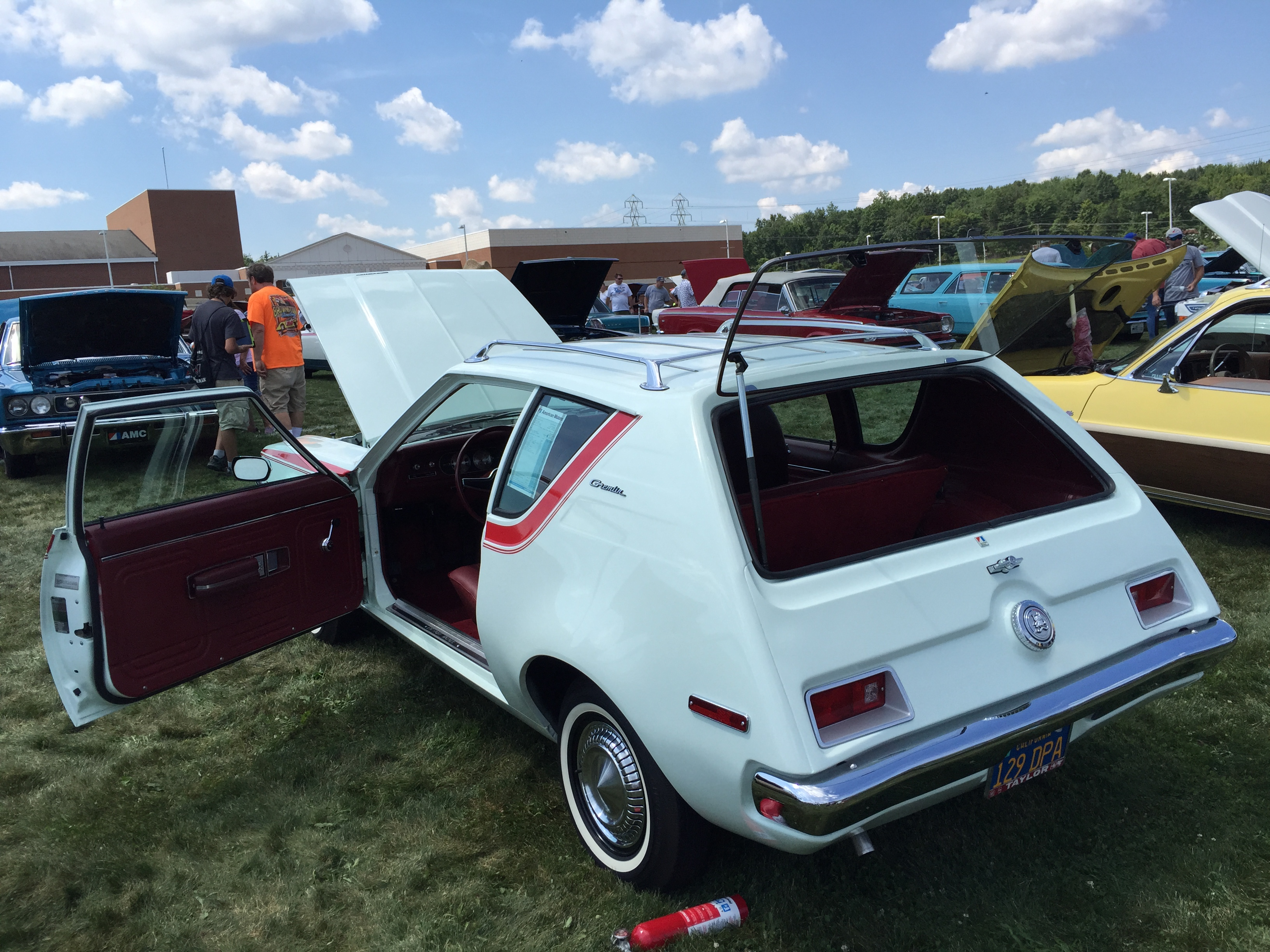
AMC Gremlin two-door with rear cargo hatch opened

Hatchback and estate or station wagon vehicles are typically described as 'three-door' or 'five-door' models in Europe and some other parts of the world. In the case of saloons or sedans and coupés, the boot/trunk lid is not counted as a door by definition because it is for a separate storage compartment - these cars are marketed as 'two-door' or 'four-door'. In Europe, the American-style labeling is occasionally used.

Doors that are for passenger egress are counted in North American markets. The openings used for cargo access are generally described by their function - such as hatch, tailgate, or liftgate - depending on the vehicle design. For example, a "two-door hatchback" will have two side doors for passengers and a rear opening to the cargo area. Similarly, a station wagon or SUV can have four-doors since the opening to the cargo area via the rear tailgate or a hatch is not counted as a door.

Passenger cars will typically have two-doors (such as coupes) or four-doors (such as sedans).

== "Doored" or "door checked" ==
Some cyclists refer to colliding with an open car door as being "doored" or "door checked". This usually happens when the cyclist is riding alongside a row of parallel-parked cars, and a driver suddenly opens his or her door immediately in front of the cyclist without first looking to see if it is safe to do so.

== Types ==
There are many different types of vehicle doors, including the following:

=== Conventional ===
A conventional door, also known as a regular door, is hinged at the front-facing edge of the door, and so allows the door to swing outward from the body of the car. These doors are relatively safe, in that if they are opened during forward motion of the vehicle, the wind resistance will work against the opening door, and will effectively force its closure.

=== Suicide ===
A suicide door is hinged on its trailing edge. The term "suicide door" was coined due to the potential for the door to fly open when the latch was released while the car was in motion.

=== Scissor ===
Scissor doors rotate vertically upward and are hinged at or near the end of the windshield. They are typically used in certain luxury cars, most prominently used by Lamborghini.

=== Butterfly ===
Butterfly doors are similar to scissor doors, but while scissor doors move up, butterfly doors also move outwards, which makes for easier entry/exit, and saves space.

=== Gull-wing ===
Gull-wing doors are hinged on their uppermost edge, at the roof rather than the side. They are so named because, when opened, the doors evoke the image of a seagull opening its wings.

=== Swan ===
Swan doors operate in a similar way to conventional car doors, but they open at an upward angle to help clear curbs, especially on lower sports cars.

=== Sliding ===
Sliding doors open by sliding horizontally or vertically, whereby the door is either mounted on or suspended from a track. They are commonly used on the sides of minivans, leisure activity vehicles, light commercial vehicles, minibuses, and some buses as this allows a large opening for equipment to be loaded and unloaded without obstructing access.

=== Canopy ===
A canopy door sits on top of a car and lifts up in some way, to provide access for passengers. It is similar to an aircraft canopy. There are no set standards to canopies, so they can be hinged at the front, side or back - although hinging at the front is most common. Canopy doors are rarely used on production cars, but are frequently used on the 'closed' variants of Le Mans Prototype endurance race cars. They are also sometimes used on concept cars.

=== Door handle ===
- Traditional external
- Press-to-release hidden - some mechanism to detect person, part of the handle tilts outwards
- Semi-hidden - partially visible door handle
- Hidden - invisible door handle
- No handle - some mechanism to detect person, opens door slightly, use door frame or frameless window glass to fully open door
- Electric pop-out - some mechanism to detect person, electrical motor moves entire handle outwards
- Manual flush - handle is pushed into the door, then fold upwards or downwards against the inside of the outside of the door

== Vehicle regulations ==
Various countries have their own regulations for vehicle doors.

Global Technical Regulation No. 1, Door locks, is one of the few global regulations. Various countries are members of these regulations, for instance, Australia, Canada, European Union, Japan, Russia, and the United States. China and India are not members.

Another international doors regulation is regulation #11: door latches and door retention components. Application of this requirement is done for instance by the European Union, Russia, Japan, New Zealand and Egypt.

There are also national regulations:

- FMVSS 206 in the USA
- IS 14225 in India
- GSO 419/1994, GSO 420/1994 in the Gulf

== See also ==
- Automobile
- Car glass
- List of auto parts
- List of cars with non-standard door designs
- Shaved doors
- Sliding door (car)
- Swan doors
- Vehicle canopy
- Vehicle Door Communication Systems (see US Patent Numbers for diagrams and application including Pat. Nos. 8,382,350; 8,596,840; 8,894,256; 9,108,569; 9,308,859; and 9,469,246)
