= WeatherTech =

American automobile accessory manufacturer

- WeatherTech Logo
- Type: Private company
- Founded: 1989; 37 years ago
- Headquarters: Bolingbrook, Illinois, United States
- Key people: David MacNeil (founder and CEO)
- Products: Automobile accessories
- Website: www.weathertech.com

WeatherTech is an American manufacturer of automobile accessories headquartered in Bolingbrook, Illinois.

== History ==
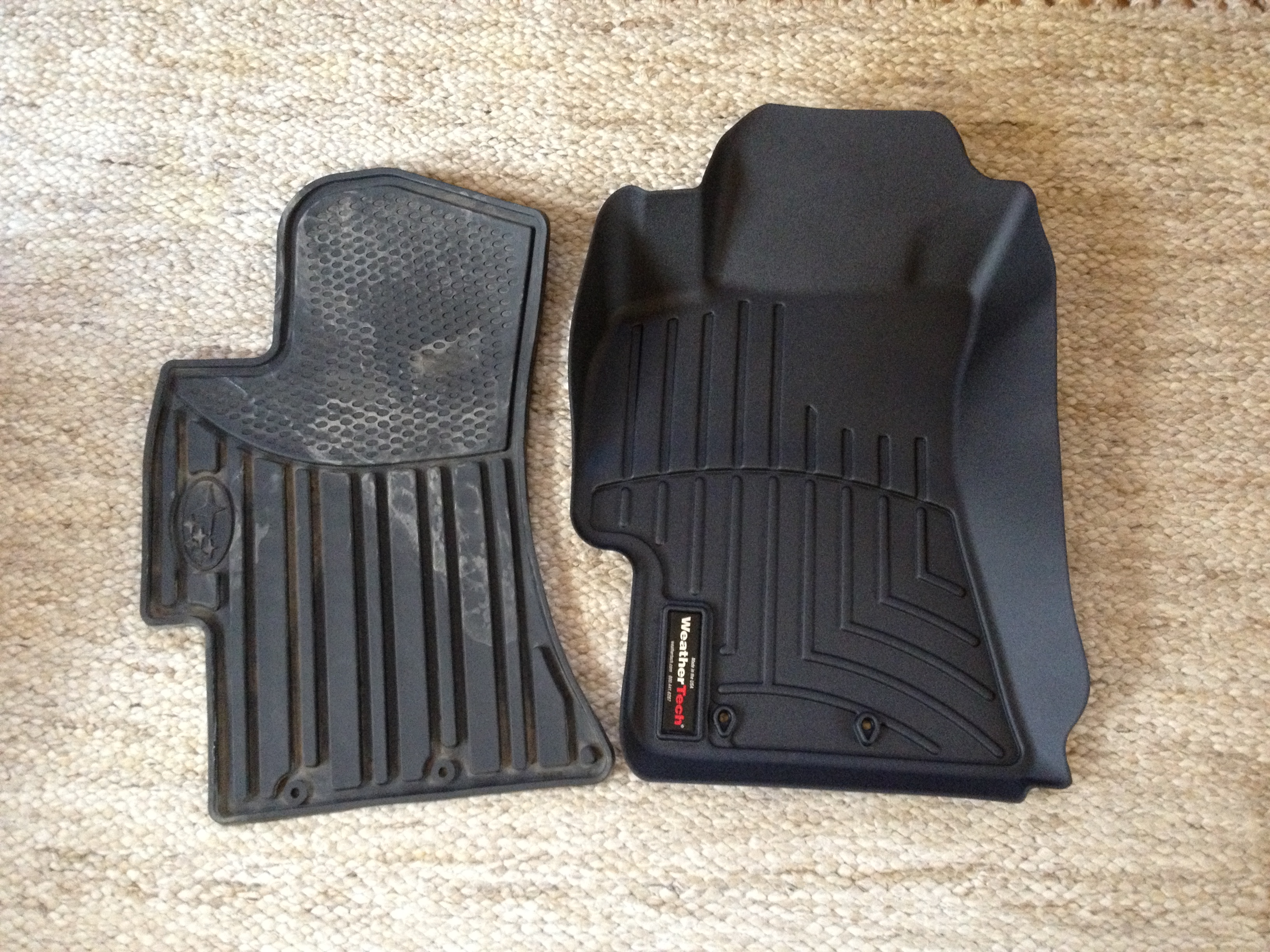
WeatherTech Digital Fit floor mat (right) compared to a 2009 Subaru Impreza WRX STI floor mat (left). MacNeil's design is intended to collect dirt better than standard mats.

WeatherTech was founded in 1989 by current CEO David MacNeil, who did not appreciate the quality of vehicle floor mats as they did not well-contain dirt and were not easy to clean. At the time, MacNeil was the vice president of sales at high-performance vehicle company AMG, now a subsidiary of Mercedes-Benz. His company began importing accessories made in England and selling them in the United States when in 1994 he found a contract manufacturer and then opened his first plants in the Chicago suburbs. On November 9, 2026, MacNeil was named Special Envoy for Manufacturing by President Donald Trump.

== Products ==
Among its other products, WeatherTech is primarily known for its FloorLiner brand of heavy-duty rubber floor mats, which it also manufactures for companies such as Volkswagen and Kia. Other products made by the company include other heavy-duty floor mats and trunk liners, windshield sun shades, mudflaps, and cupholder accessories.

WeatherTech claims over 95% of its products are manufactured in the United States at its plants in Illinois.

== Sponsorships ==
IMSA WeatherTech SportsCar Championship logo

=== IMSA WeatherTech SportsCar Championship ===
WeatherTech is the title sponsor of the International Motor Sports Association (IMSA) SportsCar Championship, currently officially known as the IMSA WeatherTech SportsCar Championship through the sponsorship. The sponsorship was announced on August 8, 2015 with the official renaming taking place on November 1 for the 2016 season.

=== WeatherTech Raceway Laguna Seca ===
On March 20, 2018, it was announced that the new title sponsor of the Laguna Seca Raceway would be WeatherTech, replacing Mazda. The track was officially renamed to WeatherTech Raceway Laguna Seca soon after on April 1.

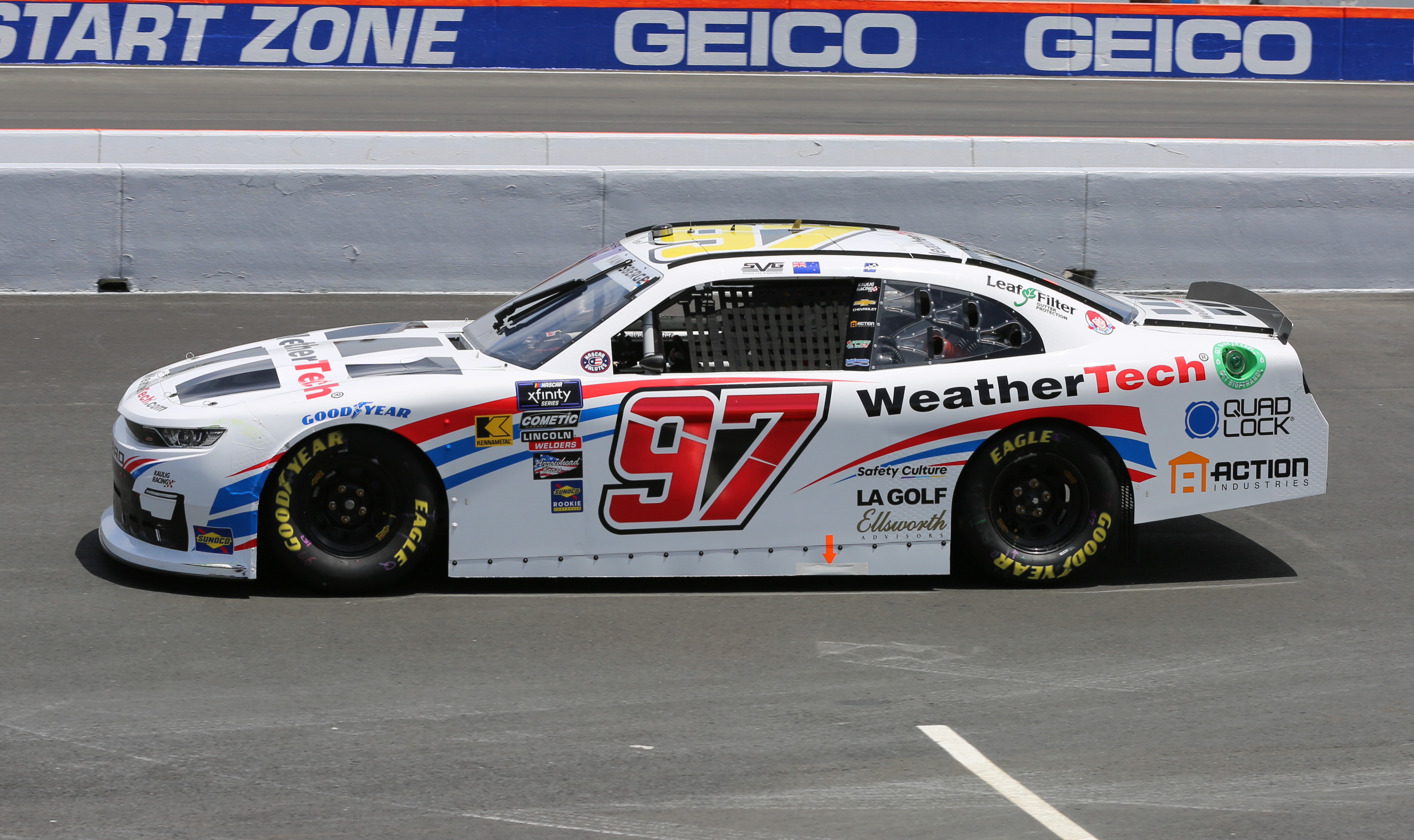
Shane van Gisbergen's No. 97 in 2024.

=== NASCAR ===
On December 13, 2023, it was announced that Shane van Gisbergen would drive in the NASCAR Xfinity Series with WeatherTech as his main sponsor. On August 24, 2024, it was announced that van Gisbergen would drive full-time in the NASCAR Cup Series with WeatherTech as his main sponsor as well. Shortly later, it was announced that Connor Zilisch would be sponsored by WeatherTech in the Xfinity Series.
