= BS 857 =

BS 857:1967 is a currently in-use British Standard specification for flat or curved safety glasses (toughened or laminated) for use in land vehicles, including road vehicles and railway vehicles. The standard specifies the mechanical, safety, impact, and optical requirements as well as sampling and test methods.

== Other vehicle safety glass standards ==
UNECE Reg. 43 is a UNECE standard for safety glass used in road vehicles.
