= Stone damage =

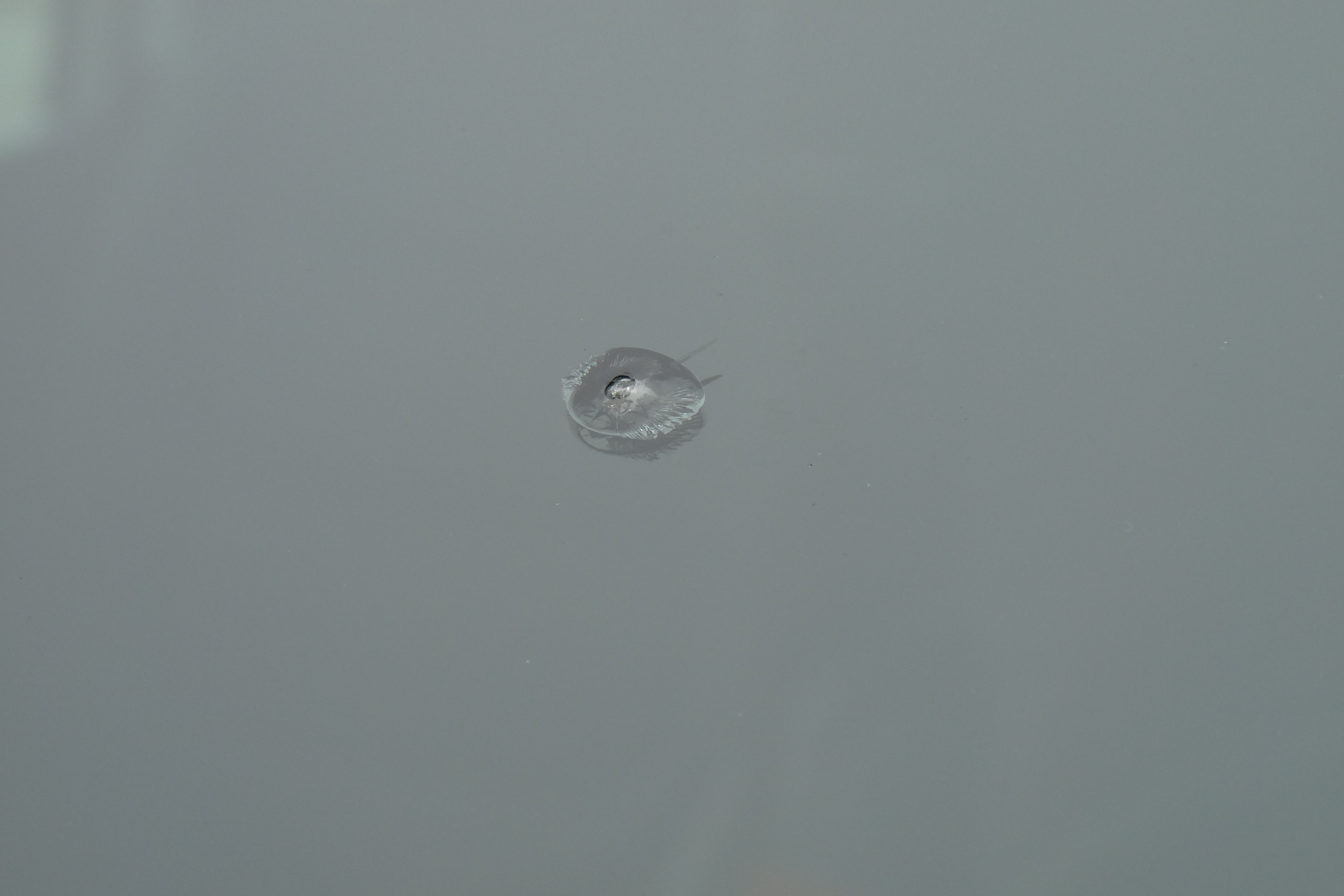
Stone damage on a windshield.

European road sign indicating danger of loose chippings.

Stone damage, or stone-chip, is the damage that gravel and small stones can make to a vehicle.

Stone damage is most common on roads on which the allowed speed exceeds 70 km/h (43 mph; 19 m/s), since stones stuck in the tires come loose at that speed and fly away with such a speed that they can damage other vehicles.

Stone damage can be dangerous in many ways. Stone damage can cause small cracks in the windshield that can refract or reflect normally harmless light in ways that can distract or blind the driver. Stone damage can also cause large cracks in the windshield – although this usually happens during the winter period due to the vast change in weather, but can also happen if the vehicle is exposed to vibrations or bumps.

One of the largest contributing factors to stone damage on windshields is the fact that modern cars normally use quite thin windshields to reduce weight. Modern tires also contribute to stone damage due to having more tracks in which stones are able to get stuck.

== See also ==
- Flyrock, unwanted flying rock ejected from the blast site of a controlled explosion
