= Flyrock =

Flyrock, or wild flyrock, is rock that is ejected from the blast site in a controlled explosion in mining operations. The term refers in particular to rock that flies beyond the blast site, causing injuries to people and damage to property. This is considered a significant issue in mining; between 1994 and 2005, 32 miners were injured by flyrock.

Flyrock can vary in mass from marble-sized to car-sized.

Accident data from the Mine Safety and Health Administration indicate that flyrock and lack of blast area security were the main causes of blasting-related injuries in surface mining. Fatal injuries due to lack of blast area security were caused mainly by failure to clear the blast area or inadequate access control to the blast area. Proper planning can reduce the incidence of flyrock.

== See also ==
- Stone damage, damage to vehicles from flying gravel and small stones in traffic
