= Door card =

Vehicle part

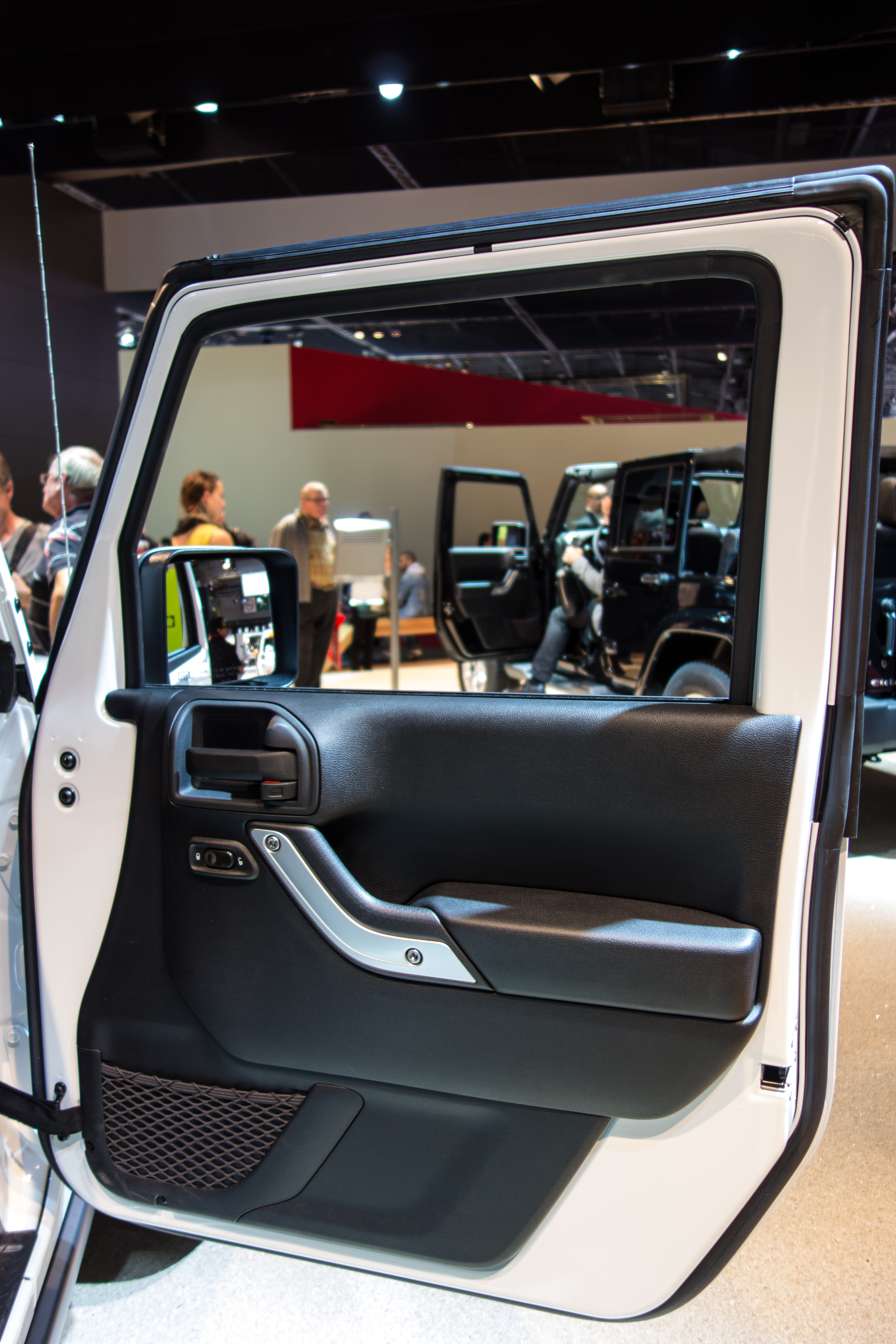
Door card finished in black on a white door frame

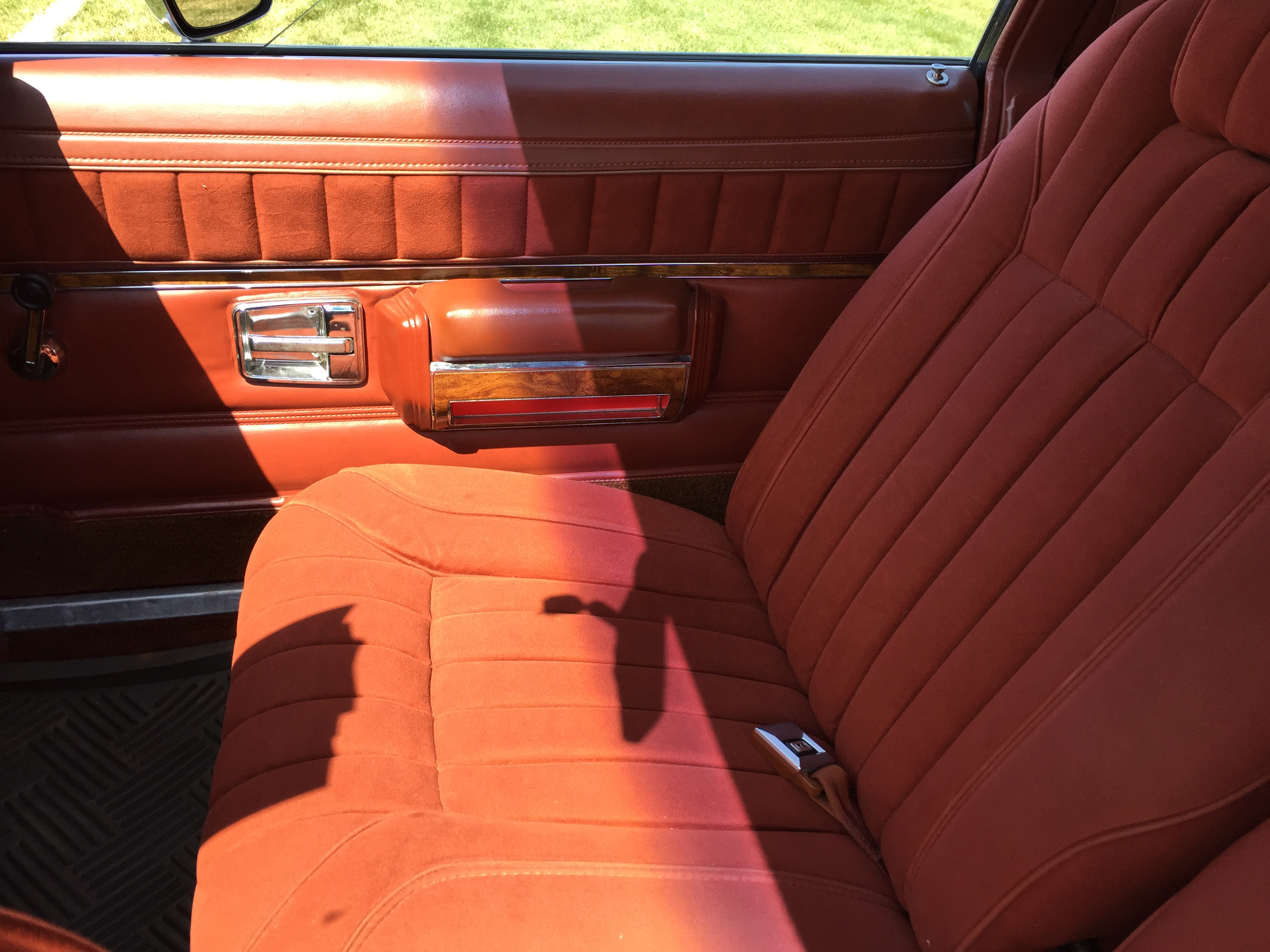
Car door panel in matching color and upholstery as the car's seats

A door card (in British English) or a door panel (in American English) is an insert on the door of a vehicle that covers the door's internal components.

== Design ==
The door card will usually match the rest of the vehicle's interior. Door panels were formerly made of cardboard with an upholstered interior finish of vinyl, leather, cloth, carpet, or other materials for the decorative trim. Modern cars typically have door cards made of plastic, most often using injection moulding, as well as incorporating other decorative materials.

The design should incorporate both the necessary service amount and the functional unit (such as "it is strong" and "it looks and feels good") so that a given car door panel "would service a car body's life span of 200,000 kilometres (124,274 mi)." The door panel typically incorporates other parts that contribute to the appearance, functionality, and ergonomics of the vehicle. These include armrests, switches or other controls for windows and the locking mechanism, convenience lights, audio speakers, storage compartments, and other features.

In most cases, the door card is attached to the car's door frame by visible screws and ones hidden behind decorative plugs or under the armrest, as well as spring clips.

== See also ==
- Vehicle door
