= Safety glass =

Glass with features that make it less likely to cause injury

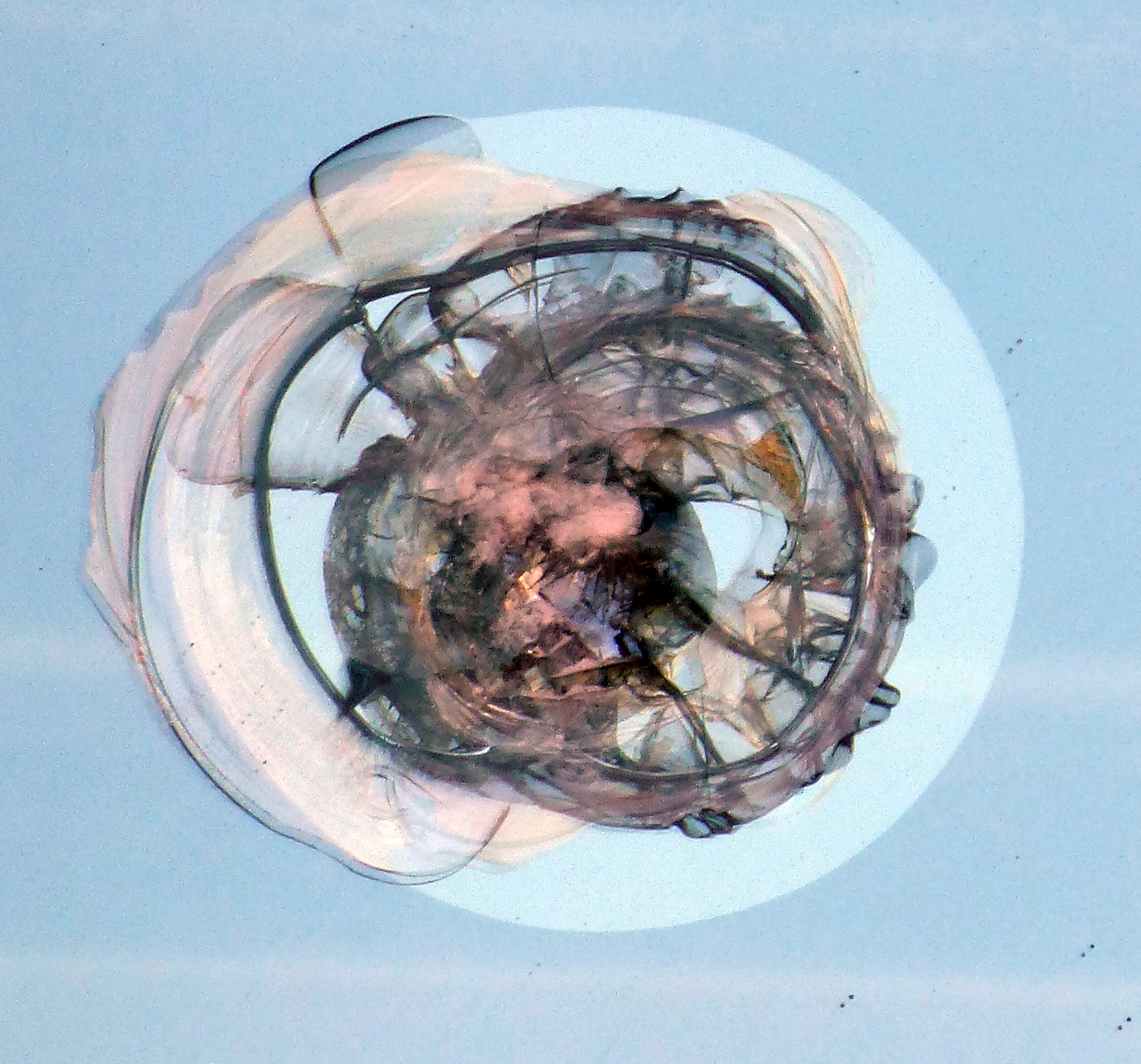
Broken safety glass shows a characteristic circular "spider web" pattern

Safety glass is glass with additional safety features that make it less likely to break, or less likely to become a hazard when broken. Common designs include toughened glass (also known as tempered glass), laminated glass, and wire mesh glass (also known as wired glass). Toughened glass was invented in 1874 by Francois Barthelemy Alfred Royer de la Bastie. Wire mesh glass was invented in 1892 by Frank Shuman. Laminated glass was invented in 1903 by the French chemist Édouard Bénédictus (1878–1930).

These three approaches can easily be combined, allowing for the creation of glass that is at the same time toughened, laminated, and contains a wire mesh. However, combination of a wire mesh with other techniques is unusual, as it typically betrays their individual qualities. In many developed countries safety glass is part of the building regulations making properties safer.

== Toughened glass ==
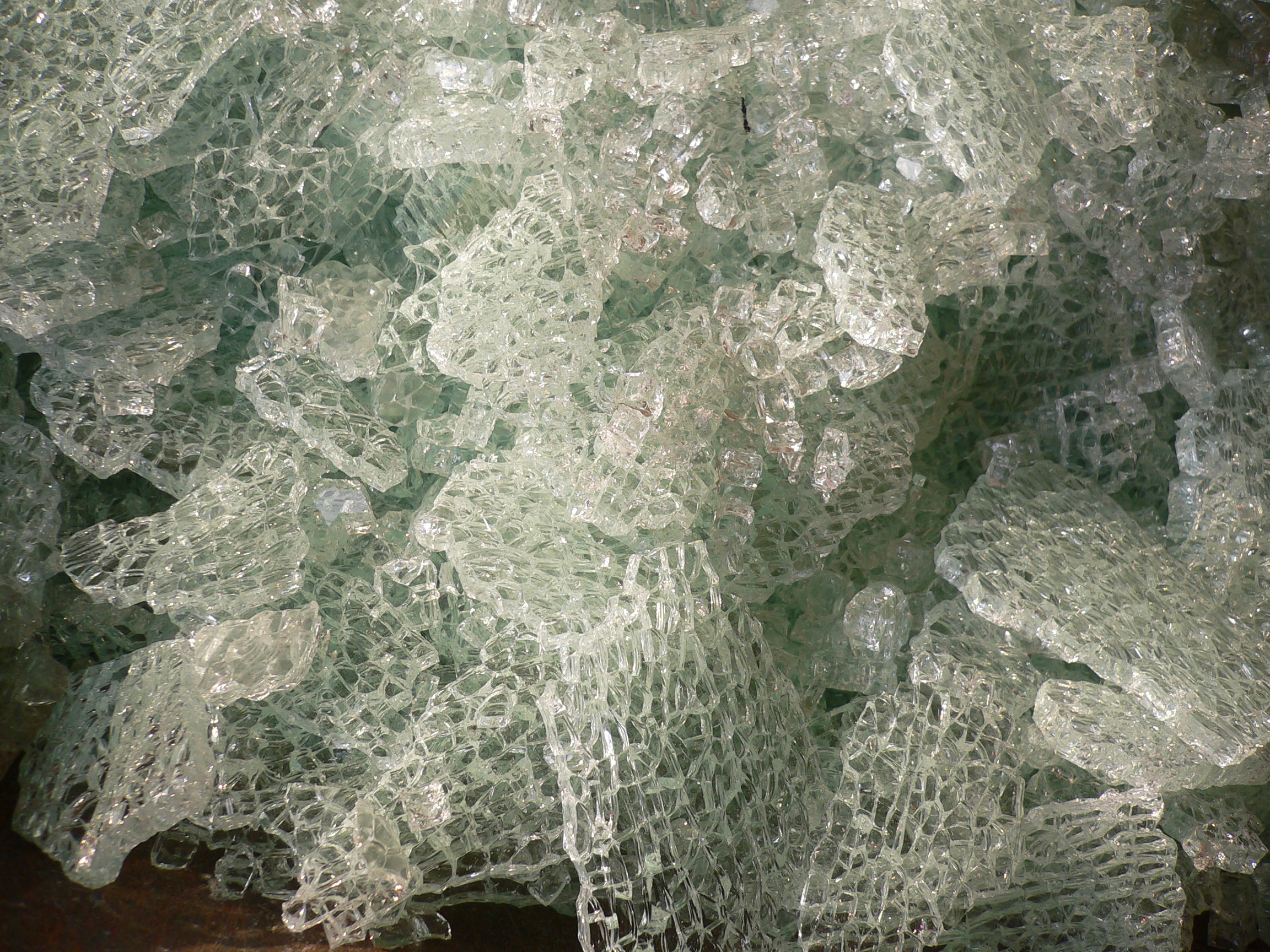
Broken tempered glass showing the shape of the granular chunks

Toughened glass is processed by controlled thermal or chemical treatments to increase its strength compared with normal glass. Tempering, by design, creates balanced internal stresses which causes the glass sheet, when broken, to crumble into small granular chunks of similar size and shape instead of splintering into random, jagged shards. The granular chunks are less likely to cause injury.

As a result of its safety and strength, tempered glass is used in a variety of demanding applications, including passenger vehicle windows, shower doors, architectural glass doors and tables, refrigerator trays, as a component of bulletproof glass, for diving masks, and various types of plates and cookware. In the United States, federal law since 1977 has required safety glass located within doors and tub and shower enclosures.

== Laminated glass ==
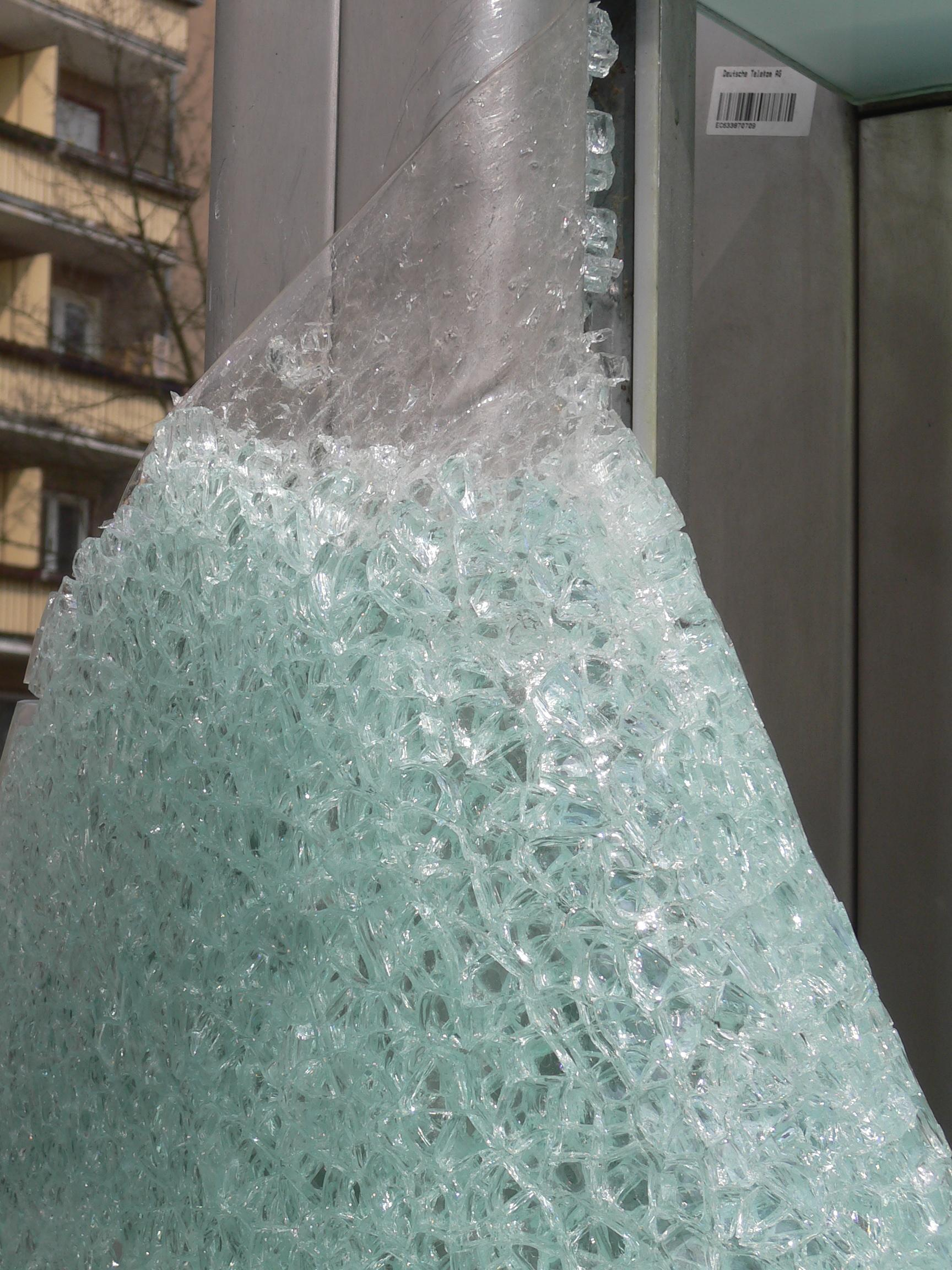
Broken laminated safety glass, with the interlayer exposed at the top of the picture

Laminated glass is composed of layers of glass and plastic held together by an interlayer. When laminated glass is broken, it is held in place by an interlayer, typically of polyvinyl butyral (PVB), between its two or more layers of glass, which crumble into small pieces. The interlayer keeps the layers of glass bonded even when broken, and its toughening prevents the glass from breaking up into large sharp pieces. This produces a characteristic "spider web" cracking pattern (radial and concentric cracks) when the impact is not enough to completely pierce the glass.

Laminated glass is normally used when there is a possibility of human impact or where the glass could fall if shattered. Skylight glazing and automobile windshields typically use laminated glass. In geographical areas requiring hurricane-resistant construction, laminated glass is often used in exterior storefronts, curtain walls and windows. The PVB interlayer also gives the glass a much higher sound insulation rating, due to the damping effect, and blocks most of the incoming UV radiation (88% in window glass and 97.4% in windscreen glass).

== Wire mesh glass ==
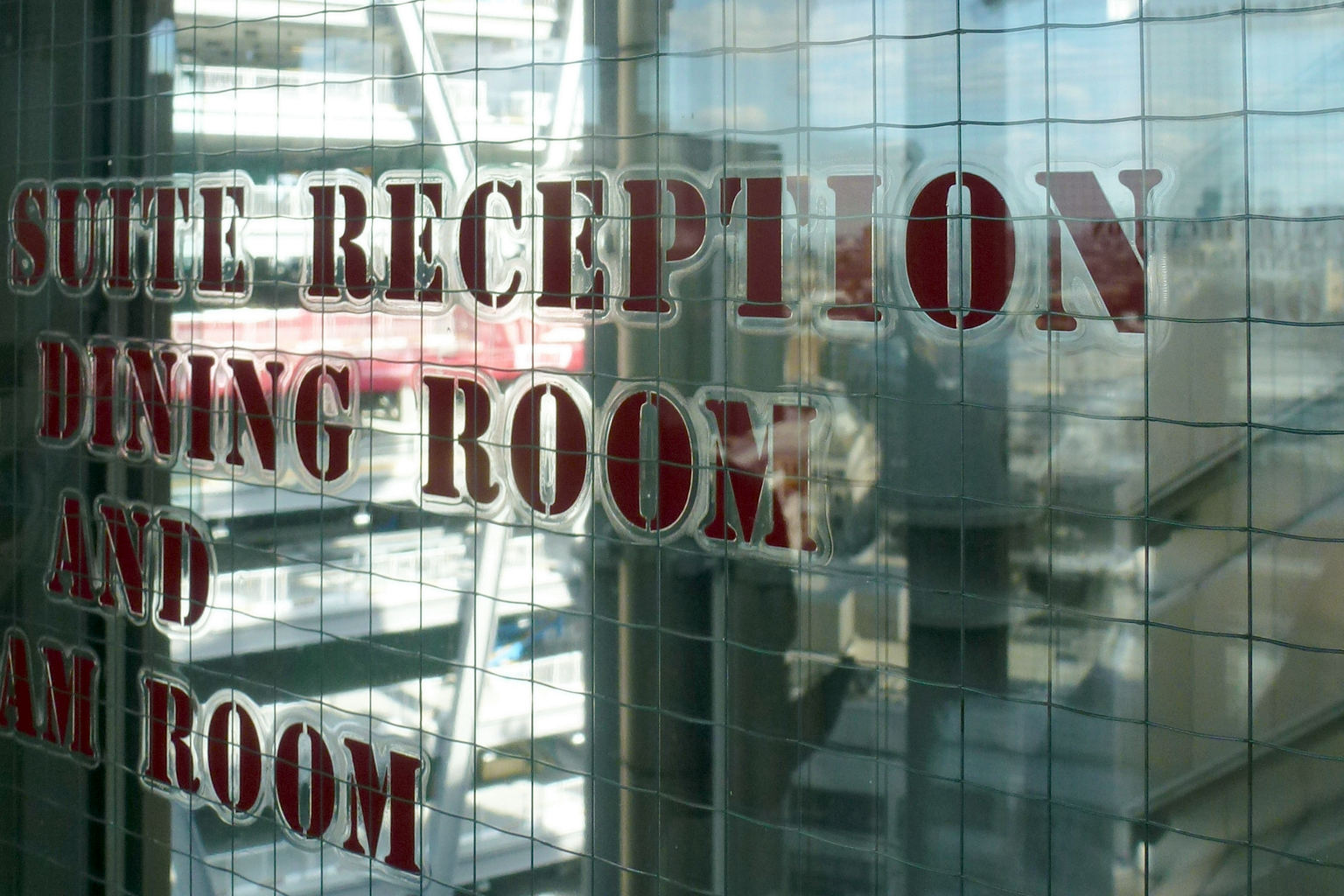
Wire-mesh-reinforced glass in the Lloyd's Building

Wire mesh glass (also known as Georgian Wired Glass) has a grid or mesh of thin metal wire embedded within the glass. Wired glass is used in the US for its fire-resistant abilities, and is well-rated to withstand both heat and hose streams. This is why wired glass exclusively is used on service elevators to prevent fire ingress to the shaft, and why it is commonly found in institutional settings which are often well-protected and partitioned against fire. The wire prevents the glass from falling out of the frame even if it cracks under thermal stress, and is far more heat-resistant than a laminating material.

Wired glass, as it is typically described, does not perform the function most individuals associate with it. The presence of the wire mesh appears to be a strengthening component, as it is metallic, and conjures up the idea of rebar in reinforced concrete or other such examples. Despite this belief, wired glass is actually weaker than unwired glass due to the incursions of the wire into the structure of the glass. Wired glass often may cause heightened injury in comparison to unwired glass, as the wire amplifies the irregularity of any fractures. This has led to a decline in its use institutionally, particularly in schools.

In recent years, new materials have become available that offer both fire-ratings and safety ratings so the continued use of wired glass is being debated worldwide. The US International Building Code effectively banned wired glass in 2006.

Canada's building codes still permit the use of wired glass but the codes are being reviewed and traditional wired glass is expected to be greatly restricted in its use. Australia has no similar review taking place.

== See also ==
- Architectural glass
