= Windshield sun shade =

Protective shields attached to a car's windshield

Windshield sun shades (also known as sun-screen shades, sunscreens, sun car shades, sun shields, heat shields, or UV shields) are protective shields attached to a car's windshield or side window to keep the sun from reaching the interior and help reduce the temperature inside it.

== History ==
The first known sun-shade patent is from 1911 and belongs to Frank H. Ilse of Chicago. There is no prior art cited with this patent, although a similar contraption was devised for hats in 1908, as mentioned in the patent application. Years later in 1970, The Israeli businessman Avraham Levy invented an accordion-like cardboard sun blocker and claimed he sold 1 million of the devices in Israel since the mid-1970s. Avi Fattal and Avi Ruimi, two young Israeli who migrated to the US, after being confronted by Levi for taking his idea without permission, modified the concept of Levi and changed the design into the shape of sunglasses, thus penetrating the American market.

== Usage ==
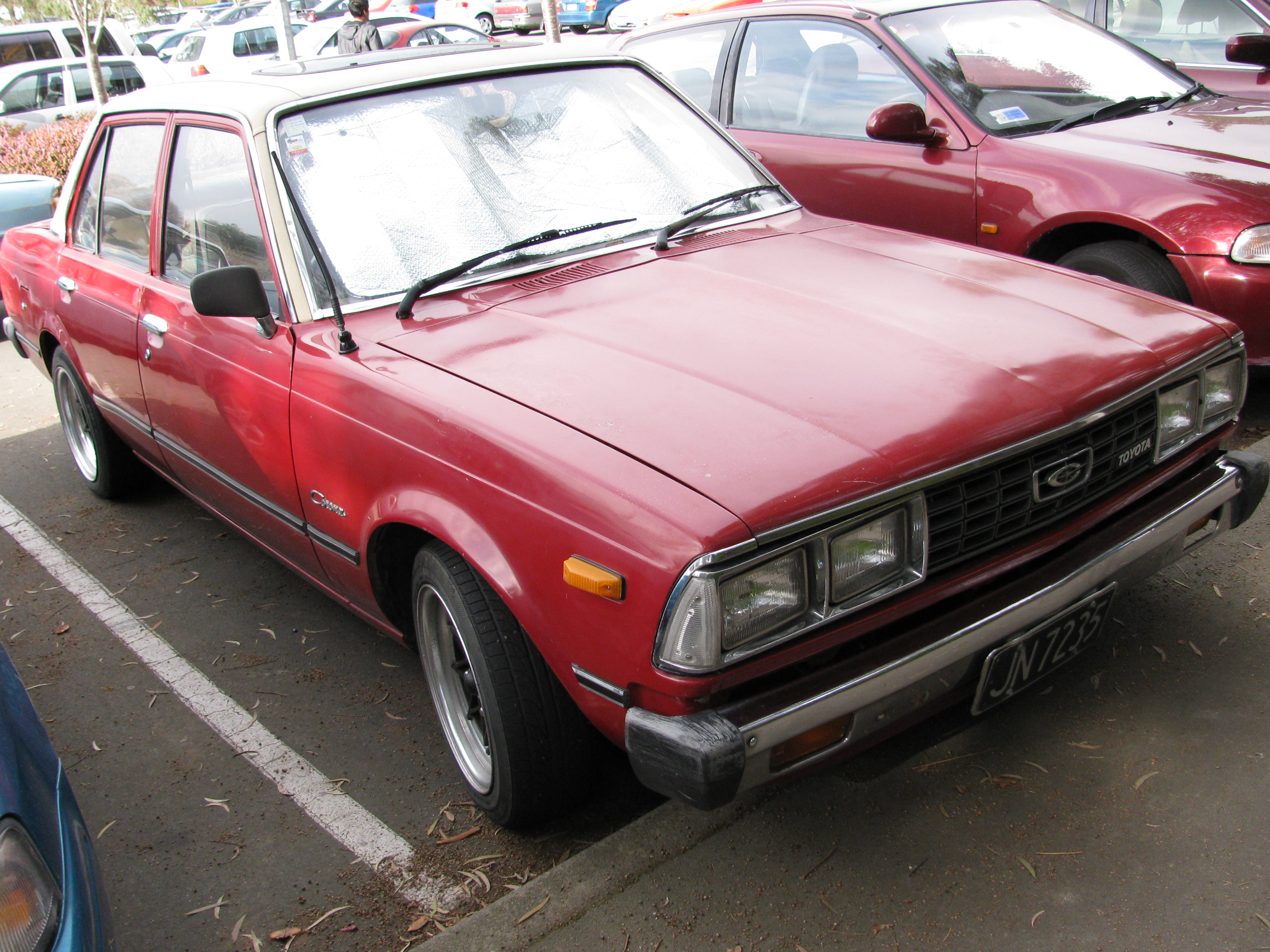
Windshield Sun Shades

Typically, the glass of the car's windshield itself blocks most of the UV light from the sun, and some of the infrared radiation. But it can't protect from the visible light that mostly penetrates through the window and gets absorbed by the objects inside the car. The visible light that passes into the interior through the windshield is converted into the infrared light which, in its turn, is blocked by the glass and gets trapped inside, heating up the interior. Some windshield sun shades have a reflective surface to bounce the light without hitting the objects in the car, reducing the interior temperature. Car sun shades are mainly used in environments with strong and direct sunshine, and thus their usage is mostly seasonal and tied to the weather of countries. During the summer they help decrease the inside temperature of the parked cars or protect passengers from direct UV rays. Sunlight passing through the car's windshield produces the greenhouse effect, heating the interior to a temperature much higher than the outside air. Without any protection, the sun can heat up a car's dark dashboards to 69 °C (156 °F) within 60 minutes. This is dangerous for adults, children, and animals. Prolonged exposure to direct sunlight can also make the dashboard fade and eventually crack, or cause damage to items left in the car, such as mobile phones, laptops and other electronic devices.

Sunshades may also be used while resting in a car, creating a sense of privacy and blocking out most of the undesired outside light from the sun in the daytime or from other cars and street lights at nighttime.

== Types ==
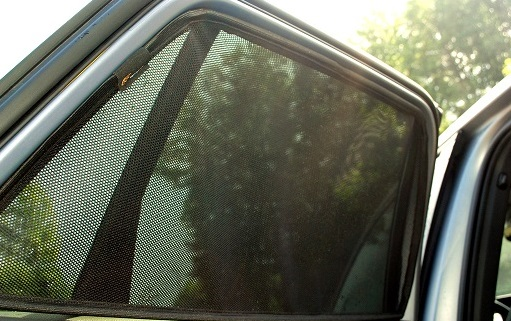

There are several variants of car sun shade types. Typically, sun shields are made of a layer of mylar or aluminum foil which covers the inside of the car's windows, to reflect the sun's rays away, and preventing the interior from being exposed to those rays. There are sunshades specifically designed to fit the inside of the front windshield of the car, and others designed for the car's side windows, or the back window. There are small rectangular shaped shades for babies made from dark nylon mesh which are attached to the window with a suction cup. These usually do not cover the whole window. There are also self-adhesive sunshades which rely on static electricity to adhere to the window. Custom-made car sunshades with additional fastening elements such as hooks, clasps, buckles or magnets that attach to the car frame or shade, are prepared to fit specific car models, and may cover the entire side-window of a car. In a similar way there exist folding sunshades which can be attached to the side window of any car with magnets. Some car shades are designed for winter use and attach to the outside of the windshield (typically with straps) to keep the window free of snow and ice.
