= Shaved doors =

Car door design

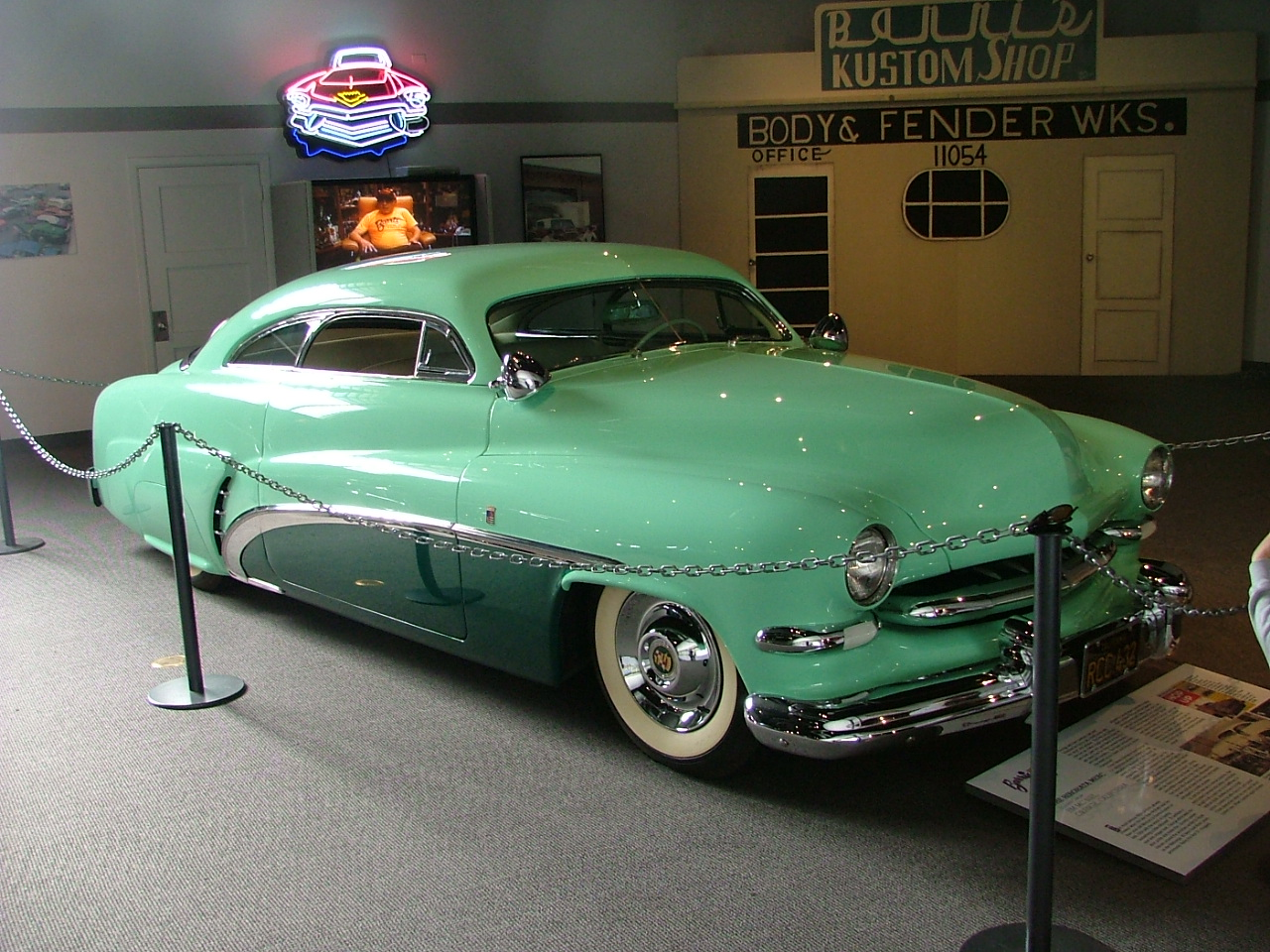
The Hirohata Merc, built for Bob Hirohata and featuring shaved door handles.

Shaved doors are doors on an automobile that do not have handles on the outside of the vehicle, in order to maintain a smooth look. It was pioneered by customiser Harry Westergard in California. The modification may also increase security as there is no keyhole to pick or handle to grab.

Shaved doors are popular on many types of custom cars, including hot rods, muscle cars, tuned cars, trucks, and mini trucks. It is also a traditional modification on many lead sleds, dating back to the 1940s. Typically, a solenoid is used to open the door, which can be triggered by button or remote. They can also often be opened mechanically with a hidden cable release.
