= Laminated glass =

Type of safety glass with a thin polymer interlayer that holds together when shattered

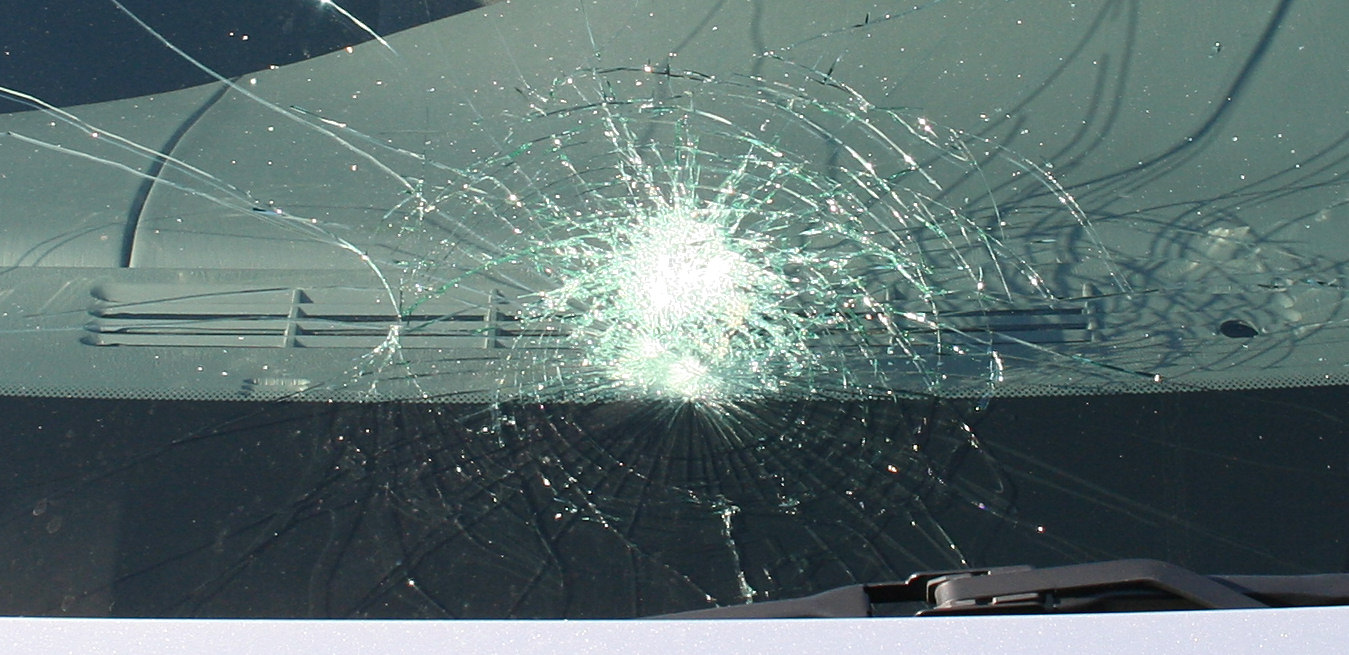
Automobile windshield with "spider web" cracking typical of laminated safety glass.

Laminated glass is a type of safety glass consisting of two or more layers of glass with one or more thin polymer interlayers between them which prevent the glass from breaking into large, sharp pieces. Breaking produces a characteristic "spider web" cracking pattern (radial and concentric cracks) when the impact is not enough to completely pierce the glass.

Laminated glass is used for architecture, glazing, automobile safety, photovoltaics (solar panels), UV protection, and artistic expression. The most common use of laminated glass is automobile windshields and skylight glazing. In geographical areas requiring hurricane-resistant construction, laminated glass is often used in exterior storefronts, curtain walls, and windows. Laminated glass is also used to increase the sound insulation rating of a window, because it significantly improves sound attenuation compared to monolithic glass panes of the same thickness.

The interlayer is typically of polyvinyl butyral (PVB), ethylene-vinyl acetate (EVA), ionoplast polymers, cast in place (CIP) liquid resin, or thermoplastic polyurethane (TPU). An additional property of laminated glass for windows is that an adequate TPU, PVB or EVA interlayer can block nearly all ultraviolet radiation. A thermoset EVA, for example, can block up to 99.9% of all UV rays. The thermoset EVA offers a complete bonding (cross-linking) with the material whether it is glass, polycarbonate (PC), or other types of products. For sound insulation, if using EVA or TPU, no additional acoustic material is required; if using PVB, a special acoustic PVB compound is used.

== History ==
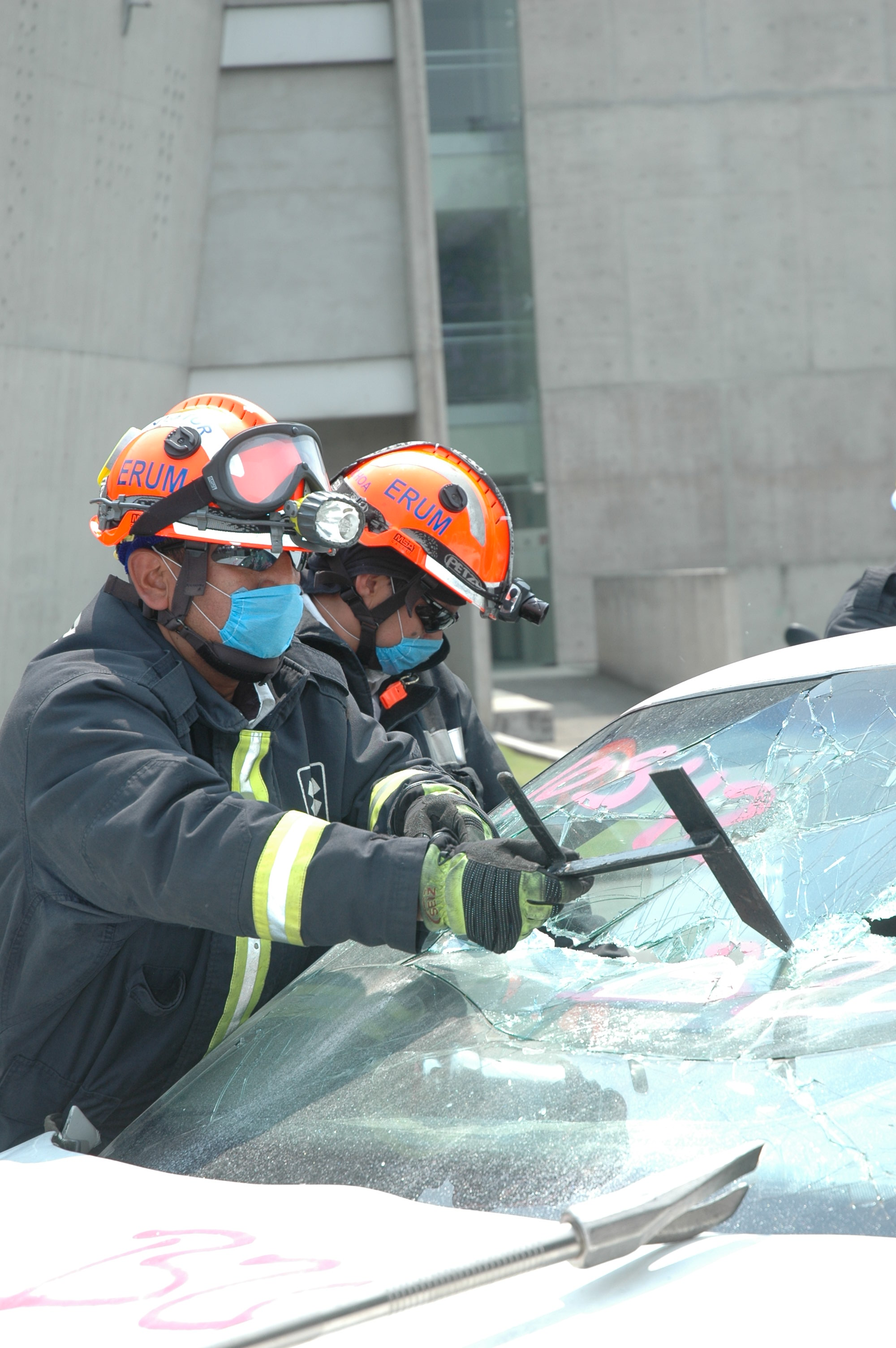
Firefighters breaking through a laminated windshield

In 1902, the French corporation Le Carbone obtained a patent for coating glass objects with celluloid to render them less susceptible to cracking or breaking.

Laminated glass was invented in 1903 by the French chemist Édouard Bénédictus (1878–1930), inspired by a laboratory accident: a glass flask had become coated with the plastic cellulose nitrate, and when dropped it shattered but did not break into pieces. In 1909 Bénédictus filed a patent, after hearing about a car accident where two women were severely injured by glass debris. In 1911, he formed the Société du Verre Triplex, which fabricated a glass-plastic composite to reduce injuries in car accidents. Production of Triplex glass was slow and painstaking, so it was expensive; it was not immediately widely adopted by automobile manufacturers, but laminated glass was widely used in the eyepieces of gas masks during World War I. In 1912, the process was licensed to the British Triplex Safety Glass company. Subsequently, in the United States, both Libbey-Owens-Ford and Du Pont with Pittsburgh Plate Glass produced Triplex glass.

Meanwhile, in 1905, John Crewe Wood, a solicitor in Swindon, Wiltshire, England, patented a laminated glass for use in windshields. The layers of glass were bonded together by Canada balsam. In 1906, he founded the Safety Motor Screen Company to produce and sell his product.

In 1927, the Canadian chemists Howard W. Matheson and Frederick W. Skirrow invented the plastic polyvinyl butyral (PVB). By 1936, United States companies had discovered that laminated "safety glass" consisting of a layer of PVB between two layers of glass would not discolor and was not easily penetrated during accidents. Within five years, the new safety glass had substantially replaced its predecessor.

In the Road Traffic Act 1930, the British Parliament required new cars to have safety-glass windshields, but did not specifically require laminated glass.

By 1939, 600,000 square feet (56,000 m^{2}) of safety glass manufactured by British Indestructo Glass, Ltd. of London was being used annually in vehicles produced at the Ford Motor Company works in Dagenham, England. The "Indestructo" safety glass was chosen because "it gives the most complete protection. In addition to being splinter-proof, it is crystal clear and permanently non-discolourable." This quote hints at issues that prevented wider use of laminated glass earlier.

== Specifications ==
A typical laminated makeup is 2.5 mm glass, 0.38 mm interlayer, and 2.5 mm glass. This gives a final product that is referred to as 5.38 mm (0.212 inches) laminated glass.

Strength can be increased with multiple laminates and thicker glass. Bullet-resistant glass, a type of laminated glass, is usually constructed using polycarbonate, thermoplastic materials, thermoset EVA, and layers of laminated glass. In automobiles, the laminated glass panel is around 6.5 mm (0.26 inches) thick, in comparison to airplane glass being three times as thick. In airliners on the front and side cockpit windows, there is often three plies of 4 mm toughened glass with 2.6 mm thick PVB between them. This is one of the makeups used for the Boeing 747 cockpit side windows. The Concorde forward pressure windshields had 7 plies, 4 glass and 3 PVB for a total thickness of 38 mm (1.5 inches). For increasing sound attenuation through laminated glass for extreme sound levels, using a mix of 3 mm, 4 mm, 5 mm, and 6 mm glass thicknesses is more effective.

== Production ==
Modern laminated glass is produced by bonding two or more layers of ordinary annealed or tempered glass together with a plastic interlayer, usually polyvinyl butyral (PVB), thermoplastic polyurethane (TPU) or ethylene-vinyl acetate (cross-linked EVA). The interlayer is meant to improve the mechanical properties such as impact strength, fracture toughness, and failure modes. The plastic interlayer is sandwiched by the glass, which is then passed through a series of rollers or vacuum bagging systems to expel any air pockets. The assembly then is heated for the initial melt, and the assembly is heated again under pressure in an autoclave (oven) to achieve the final bonded product (fully crosslinked in the case of the thermoset EVA). The tint at the top of some car windshields is in the PVB. To obtain a colored glass, colored PC films can be combined with the thermoset EVA material during the laminating process.

Digital printing is now available for architectural applications by either printing directly to the glass and then laminating, or printing directly to the PVB as is the case with the trademarked Dupont SentryGlas Expressions process. Full CMYK images can be printed to the interlayer prior to the autoclave process, and present vivid translucent representations. This process has become popular in architectural, interior design, and signage industries.

Once a thermoset EVA is properly laminated, the glass can be presented frameless. There should be no water/moisture infiltration, very little discoloration, and no delamination due to the high level of bonding (crosslinking). Newer developments have increased the thermoplastic family for the lamination of glass. Beside PVB, other important thermoplastic glass lamination materials today are ethylene-vinyl acetate (EVA), thermoset EVA, and thermoplastic polyurethane (TPU). The adhesion of TPU is not only high to glass, but also to polymeric interlayers.

Laminated glass is also sometimes used in glass sculptures and is widely utilized in architectural applications. In addition, laminated glass has applications in making bulletproof glass, penetration-proof glass, stairs, rooftops, floors, canopies, and beams.

=== LED glass ===
Since 2004, metallized and electroconductive polyethylene terephthalate (PET) interlayers are used as substrate for light emitting diodes (LEDs) and laminated to or between glass. Colored interlayers can be added to provide a permanent transparent color for a laminated glass panel. A switchable interlayer can also be added to create a panel which can be clear when a small electric current is passed through the interlayer and opaque when the current is switched off.

For LED glass, the layers are:

- Glass
- Transparent thermoplastic materials (TPU, PVB, or EVA) or transparent thermoset material (EVA)
- LEDs on transparent conductive polymer
- Transparent thermoplastic materials (TPU, PVB, or EVA) or transparent thermoset material (EVA)
- Glass

== Performance ==
For laminated glass, the post-breakage strength and safety are most important when analyzing its performance. The interaction between the glass and its interlayer determines the failure of the panels. In testing the performance of laminated glass, the panel is subjected to impact loading and bending, where the interlayer material transfers shear stress to the glass. The stiffness in the interlayer will determine the overall bending stiffness of the laminated glass panel. Laminated glass fails due to the cohesive failure of the interlayer and/or the connectivity between the panel and interlayer. The failure of the interlayer can occur when the interlayer material is ductile (at room temperature), or brittle and stiff (when working below the glass transition temperature).

== Benefits ==
The main benefits of laminated glass are: increased safety/security, reduced emissions, reduced noise pollution, and protection during natural disasters. Laminated glass increases safety for people during vehicle accidents since their windshield will stay intact, preventing glass fragments from injuring passengers. For security, laminated glass is difficult to break, which prevents intruders. Laminated glass can also reduce heating from the sun, allow building interiors to stay cool and reducing energy consumption. Depending on its thickness, laminated glass can reduce noise pollution coming from the exterior. In natural disasters such as hurricanes or earthquakes, laminated glass will remain intact and reduce potential injuries and deaths.

== Cutting ==
Plastic interlayers in laminated glass make its cutting difficult. There is an unsafe practice of cutting both sides separately, pouring a flammable liquid such as denatured alcohol into the crack, and igniting it to melt the interlayer to separate the pieces. The following safer methods were recommended by the UK Government's Health and Safety Executive in 2005:

- Special purpose laminated cutting tables
- Vertically inclined saw frames
- A blowlamp or hot air blower.
- High pressure abrasive waterjet.

Cutting laminated glass requires a different scoring procedure since the glass has resistance to fracture. Laminated glass can be broken through breaks, which depends on the distance between the edge of the glass and its score. The most common breaks for laminated glass are pressure break, tweak break, table break, tap break, and pliers break. Pressure breaks, intended for scores that are more than 12 inches from the edge, flips the glass over on a table surface with the score facing downwards. Pressure would be applied on either sides of the score until the glass panel breaks. Tweak break, meant for scores between 4 and 6 inches from the edge, involves using one's fingertips to propagate the break along the score line. Table break, recommended for glasses with at least 12 to 18 inches from the edge, uses the table edge to break the score. For scores close to the edge, tap break is recommended at the expense of a scalloping effect on the glass edge. For this type of break, drop jaw pliers or glass pliers are used to break the glass along the score. For scores less than 1/2 to 1 inches from the edge, pliers break would use pliers to place a downwards pressure on the glass, breaking the score through an angle.

After cutting the laminated glass panels, there are different ways to separate the interlayer. The most common methods are melting it and cutting it. Before, glaziers often used denatured alcohol to melt the polyvinyl butyral (PVB) layer, however, this method proved to be dangerous as alcohol is flammable. A safer alternative is to melt the PVB lamination layer with a heat gun. Once the interlayer is melted, the separation is cut using a single-edged razor blade or a tape measure blade. With the blade, one would stroke the score and cut the PVB until the glass is separated from the interlayer completely.

== Repair ==
According to the United States National Windshield Repair Association, laminated glass repair is possible for minor impact damage using a process that involves drilling into the fractured glass to reach the lamination layer. Special clear adhesive resin is injected under pressure and then cured with ultraviolet light. When done properly, the strength and clarity is sufficiently restored for most safety related purposes. The process is widely used to repair large industrial automotive windshields where the damage does not interfere with the view of the driver.

== Disposal ==
Waste disposal of laminated glass is no longer permitted in landfill in most European countries as the End of Life Vehicles Directive (ELV) is implemented. While the interlayer material cannot be easily recycled, research has been done to recycle the interlayer by mechanical processes and use them in other applications. A study by University of Surrey and Pilkington Glass proposes that waste laminated glass be placed into a separating device such as a rolling mill where the glass is fragmented and the larger cullet is mechanically detached from the inner film. The application of heat then melts the laminating plastic, usually polyvinyl butyral (PVB), enabling both the glass and the interior film to be recycled. The PVB recycling process is a simple procedure of melting and reshaping it. However, the recycled PVB will have structure variations and lower strength properties than the original polymer. Also TPU is easy to recycle as all non crosslinked plastics.

== See also ==
- Toughened glass
- BS 857
- LED Film
- Composite glass
- Unbreakable glass
