= Windshield =

Front window of vehicle

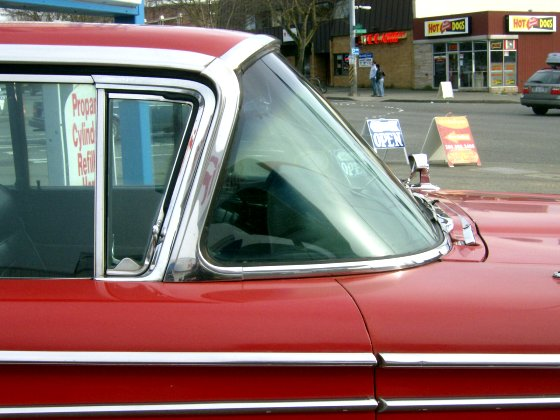
Panoramic (wrap-around) windshield on a 1959 Edsel Corsair

The windshield (American English and Canadian English) or windscreen (Commonwealth English) of an aircraft, car, bus, motorbike, truck, train, boat or streetcar is the front window, which provides visibility while protecting occupants from the elements. Modern windshields are generally made of laminated safety glass, a type of treated glass, which consists of, typically, two curved sheets of glass with a plastic layer laminated between them for safety, and bonded into the window frame.

Motorcycle windshields are often made of high-impact polycarbonate or acrylic plastic.

== Usage ==
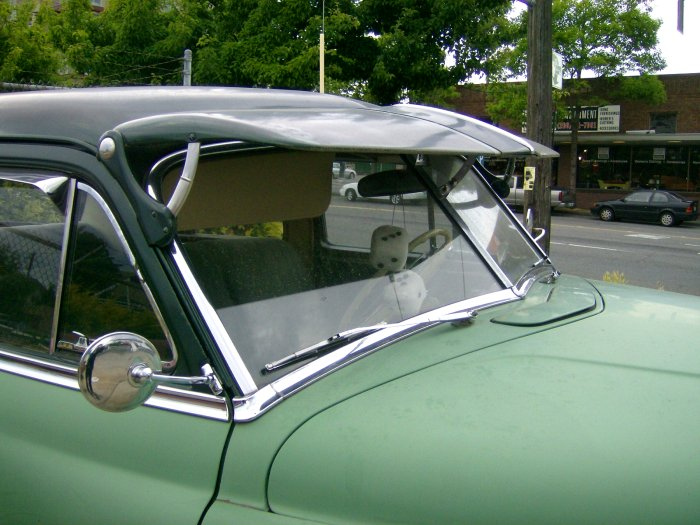
Split and raked windshield on a 1952 DeSoto. Note the panes of glass are flat.

Windshields protect the vehicle's occupants from wind and flying debris such as dust, insects, and rocks, and provide an aerodynamically formed window towards the front. UV coating may be applied to screen out harmful ultraviolet radiation. However, this is usually unnecessary since most auto windshields are made from laminated safety glass. The majority of UV-B is absorbed by the glass itself, and any remaining UV-B together with most of the UV-A is absorbed by the PVB bonding layer.

On motorbikes their main function is to shield the rider from wind, though not as completely as in a car, whereas on sports and racing motorcycles the main function is reducing drag when the rider assumes the optimal aerodynamic configuration with their body in unison with the machine and does not shield the rider from wind when sitting upright.

== Safety ==
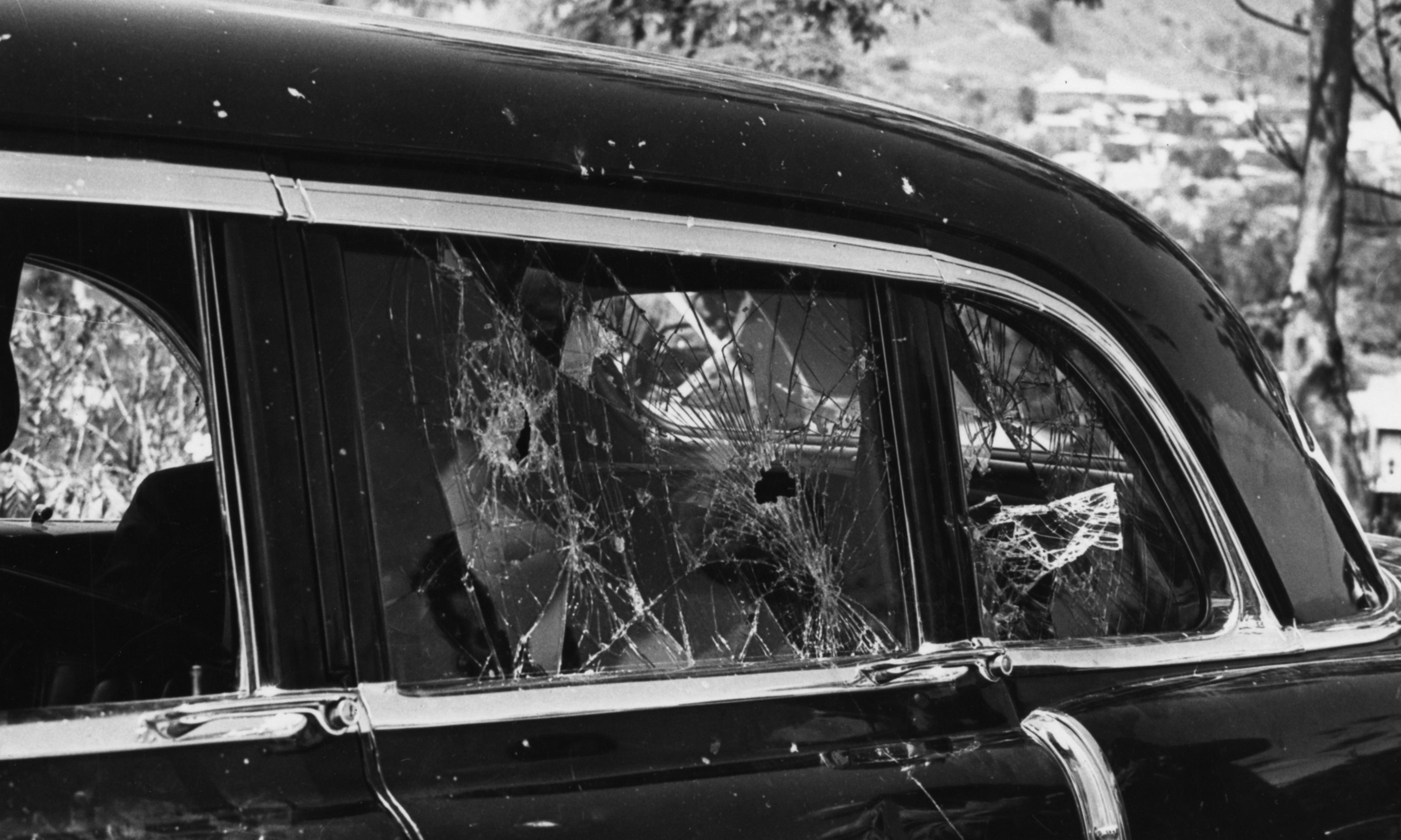
The laminated glass in Vice President Richard Nixon's vehicle was nearly breached by a hostile crowd in Caracas in 1958

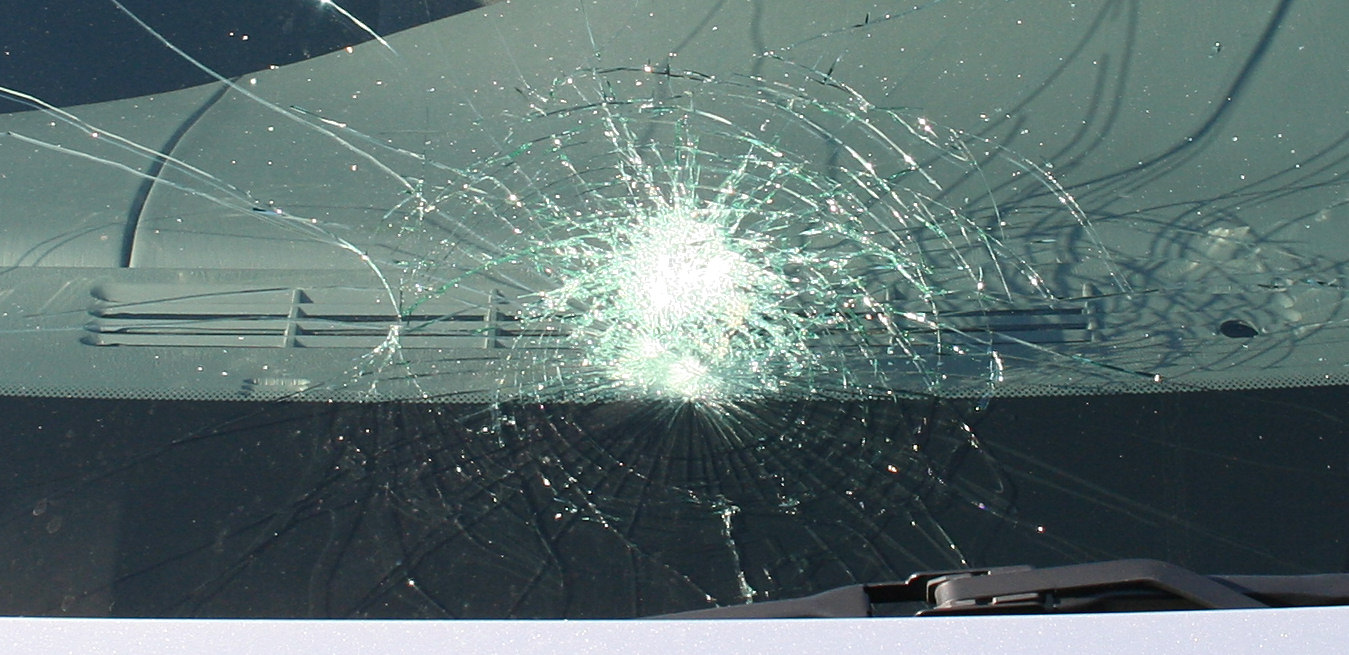
Automobile windshield displaying "spiderweb" cracking typical of laminated safety glass

Early windshields were made of ordinary window glass, but that could lead to serious injuries in the event of a crash. A series of crashes led up to the development of stronger windshields. The most notable example of this is the Pane vs. Ford case of 1917 that decided against Pane in that he was only injured through reckless driving. They were replaced with windshields made of toughened glass and were fitted in the frame using a rubber or neoprene seal. The hardened glass shattered into many mostly harmless fragments when the windshield broke. These windshields, however, could shatter from a simple stone chip. "Triplex" glass laminating, however, had been available for windshields in France from 1911 and in Britain from 1912; it was adopted as an accessory by some high-end American auto manufacturers beginning in 1913, and from 1919 to 1929 Henry Ford ordered the use of laminated glass on all of his vehicles.

Modern, glued-in windshields contribute to the vehicle's rigidity, but the main force for innovation has historically been the need to prevent injury from sharp glass fragments. Almost all nations now require windshields to stay in one piece even if broken, except if pierced by a strong force.

The urethane sealant is protected from UV in sunlight by a dark ceramic coating called a frit around the edge of the windshield. The coating transitions to the clear windshield across a dot matrix halftone pattern to minimize thermal stress in manufacturing. The same ceramic coating is often applied around the rearview mirror mount to protect its adhesive.

On a rainy day, water refraction on aircraft windshields can mislead pilots into believing that they are flying at a higher altitude than they actually are due to the horizon appearing lower than it is. This can result in undershooting the runway and become a safety hazard.

== Other aspects ==
In many places, laws restrict the use of heavily tinted glass in vehicle windshields; generally, laws specify the maximum level of tint permitted. Some vehicles have noticeably more tint in the uppermost part of the windshield to block sunglare.

In aircraft windshields, an electric current is applied through a conducting layer of tin(IV) oxide to generate heat to prevent icing. A similar system for automobile windshields, introduced on Ford vehicles as "Quickclear" in Europe ("InstaClear" in North America) in the 1980s and through the early 1990s, used this conductive metallic coating applied to the inboard side of the outer layer of glass. Other glass manufacturers utilize a grid of micro-thin wires to conduct the heat especially on the later European Ford Transit vans. These systems are more typically utilized by European auto manufacturers such as Jaguar and Porsche.

The use of thermal glass prevents some navigation systems from functioning correctly, as the embedded metal blocks the satellite signal. The RF signal tends to flow along the metal wires or layer so very little radiation can pass. This can be resolved by using an external antenna. Mobile telephones can also have problems; thermal glass typically allows only 0.001 (1‰, or one per mille) of the signal to pass, whereas a concrete wall with rebars allows up to 0.100 (10%, or 100‰) of the signal to pass.

== Terminology ==
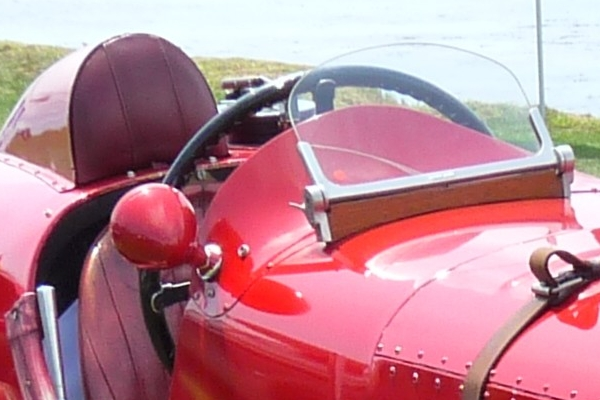
Singled aero screen on Bentley Blower No.1

The term windshield is used generally throughout the US and Canada. The term windscreen is the usual term in the British Isles and Australasia for all vehicles. In the US windscreen refers to the mesh or foam placed over a microphone to minimize wind noise, while a windshield refers to the front window of a car. In the UK, the terms are reversed, although generally, the foam screen is referred to as a microphone shield, and not a windshield.

Sports or racing cars would sometimes have aero screens, which were small semi-circular or rectangular windshields. These were often mounted in pairs behind a foldable flat windshield. Aero screens are usually less than 20 cm (8 inches) in height. They are known as aero screens because they only deflect the wind. The twin aeroscreen setup (often called Brooklands) was popular among older sports and modern cars in vintage style.

A wiperless windshield is a windshield that uses a mechanism other than wipers to remove snow and rain from the windshield. The concept car Acura TL features a wiperless windshield using a series of jet nozzles in the cowl to blow pressurized air onto the windshield. Also several glass manufacturers have experimented with nano type coatings designed to repel external contaminants with varying degrees of success but to date none of these have made it to commercial applications.

In the context of cargo ships, a windshield may refer to a bow windshield, a structure fitted on the bow to decrease drag and improve fuel efficiency.

== Certification ==
Certification of a windshield is necessary to ensure safety. Different countries have made different set of rule that all windshield manufacturers need to comply under Motor Vehicle Acts. Some of the most known certifications include US DOT, EU ECE, Chinese CCC, South African SABS and Indian BIS standards. These certification ensures safety, reliability and quality of a product as per respective legal requirements.

== Repair of stone-chip and crack damage ==
According to the US National Windshield Repair Association, many types of stone damage can be successfully repaired. Whether the windshield can be repaired always depends upon four factors: the size, type, depth and location of the damage.

=== Size and depth ===
Repair of cracks up to 6.1 cm (2.4 inches) is within permissible limits; automobile glass with more severe damage needs to be replaced. However, this is dependent on local laws. If a crack extends to the edge of the panel then this would compromise the structural integrity of the windshield. Aircraft windshields are designed in such a way that even if a crack were to extend all the way across the panel, the structural integrity is maintained via multiple failsafe methods in both frame and the glass plies. A sacrificial outer layer that cracks rather than devitrifies is the first failsafe.

=== Type ===
Circular bullseyes, linear cracks, crack chips, dings, pits and star-shaped breaks can be repaired without removing the glass, eliminating the risk of leaking or bonding problems sometimes associated with replacement.

=== Location ===
Some damages are very difficult to repair, or cannot be repaired:

- on inside of the windshield
- deep damage on both layers of glass due to solar absorption or oxidation.
- damage over rain sensor or internal radio antenna
- complex multiple cracks
- very long cracks (i.e. over 45–60 cm or 18–24 inches long)
- contaminated cracks
- edge cracks

In cracked windshield repair, air is removed from the damaged area on the windshield with a specified vacuum injection pump. Then using the injection pump, the clear adhesive resin is injected to replace the air in the windshield crack. The resin is then cured with an ultraviolet light. When done properly, the damaged area’s strength is restored, as is 90–95% of the clarity.

== Replacement ==
Windshields that cannot be repaired have to be replaced. Replacement of a windshield typically takes less than an hour. To ensure the vehicle is safe to drive, time values called the Safe Drive Away Time have been established. Windshields which have been replaced must cure or bond sufficiently until they are able to withstand the forces of a crash. Knowing the minimum time needed to cure the glass bonding adhesives is therefore important. This safe drive away time (SDAT) or minimum drive away time (MDAT) refers to the time required until a windshield installation or glass replacement is considered safe to drive again. Criteria are specified in U.S. Federal Motor Vehicle Safety Standards 212/208 (see FMVSS) to ensure the reliability of adhesive systems. Typically the SDAT is verified with crash tests as well as with high-speed laboratory test methods.

Consumers may be unaware that the MDAT or SDAT time is focused on safety and not necessarily on the quality, durability, or warranty of the installation. Care must be taken not to drive the vehicle prior to the SDAT/MDAT.

Airbags deploy at speeds up to 320 km/h (200 mph; 89 m/s) and in some cases exert tremendous force on the windshield. Occupants can impact the airbag just 50 ms after initial deployment. Depending on vehicle design, airbag deployment and/or occupant impact into the airbag may increase forces on the windshield, dramatically in some cases. Forces of occupants on the airbags - and hence the potential forces on the windshield - are lower for belted occupants. As consequence, adhesive suppliers usually inform their customers about the level of security achieved:

1) Example: Security exceeding FMVSS 212/208 belted

2) Example: Security exceeding FMVSS 212/208 unbelted

With the advent of quick-cure adhesives, mobile windshield replacements have become more prevalent. Often the temperature and humidity cannot be controlled for mobile installations. For most common glass adhesives the ideal environment is 21 °C (70 °F) and 50% humidity. Variations from the ideal curing environment can increase the time needed for a sufficiently safe bond to form. Because of the variables and difficulties involved in mobile windshield replacement, many vehicle manufacturers do not recommend this method of installations.

== Disposal ==
Waste disposal of laminated glass is no longer permitted in a landfill in most European countries as the End of Life Vehicles Directive (ELV) is implemented. A study by Surrey University and Pilkington Glass proposes that waste laminated glass be placed into a separating device such as a rolling mill where the glass is fragmented and the larger cullet is mechanically detached from the inner film. The application of heat then melts the laminating plastic, usually, polyvinyl butyral "PVB" enabling both the glass and the interior film to be recycled. The PVB recycling process is a simple procedure of melting and reshaping it. One possible method of recycling of simple automotive laminated windshields could involve heating the windshield to above the melting point of the PVB interlayer and then separating the glass plies. This depends chiefly on the differential melting points of PVB and glass and is not suitable for other interlayer materials such as silicone based materials.

== See also ==
- Automotive head-up display
- BS 857
- Driver visibility
- Glass run channel
- List of auto parts
- Motorcycle windshield
- Noise barrier
- Windscreen wiper
- Windshield sun shade
