= Polyvinyl butyral =

Names
- Other names Poly(vinyl butyral); Poly[(2-propyl-1,3-dioxane-4,6-diyl)methylene]

Identifiers
CAS Number	63148-65-2; 915977-69-4
ChemSpider	none
ECHA InfoCard	100.126.112
CompTox Dashboard (EPA)	DTXSID2095231

Properties
Chemical formula	(C_{8}H_{14}O_{2})_{n}
Molar mass	Variable
- Except where otherwise noted, data are given for materials in their standard state (at 25 °C [77 °F], 100 kPa). verify (what is ?) Infobox references

Polyvinyl butyral (or PVB) is a resin mostly used for applications that require strong binding, optical clarity, adhesion to many surfaces, toughness and flexibility. It is prepared from polyvinyl alcohol by reaction with butyraldehyde. The major application is laminated safety glass for automobile windshields. Trade names for PVB-films include KB PVB, GUTMANN PVB, Saflex, GlasNovations, Butacite, WINLITE, S-Lec, Trosifol and EVERLAM. PVB is also available as 3D printer filament that is stronger and more heat resistant than polylactic acid (PLA).

== Applications ==
=== Automotive and architectural ===
Laminated glass, commonly used in the automotive and architectural fields, comprises a protective interlayer, usually polyvinyl butyral, bonded between two panels of glass. The bonding process takes place under heat and pressure. When laminated under these conditions, the PVB interlayer becomes optically clear and binds the two panes of glass together. Once sealed together, the glass "sandwich" (i.e., laminate) behaves as a single unit and looks like normal glass. The polymer interlayer of PVB is tough and ductile, so brittle cracks will not pass from one side of the laminate to the other.

=== Colors ===
PVB interlayer can be manufactured in colored sheets, such as for the blue or green "shade band" at the top edge of many automobile windshields. PVB interlayers can also be manufactured in different colors for architectural laminated glass.

=== Solar modules ===
PVB has gained acceptance among manufacturers of photovoltaic thin film solar modules. The photovoltaic circuit is formed on a sheet of glass using thin film deposition and patterning techniques. PVB and a second sheet of glass (called back glass) are then placed directly on the circuit. The lamination of this sandwich encapsulates the circuit, protecting it from the environment. Current is extracted from the module at a sealed terminal box that is attached to the circuit through a hole in the back glass. Another common laminant used in the solar industry is ethylene-vinyl acetate (EVA).

=== Non-film applications ===
PVB resins (provided by the manufacturer in powdered or granulated form) are also utilized in a range of applications including technical ceramic (temporary) binders, inks, dye transfer ribbon inks, paints & coatings (including wash primers), binders for reflective sheet and binders for magnetic media. PVB resin is particularly useful at bonding to metals, ceramics and other inorganics.

== Properties of PVB-laminated glass ==
Annealed glass, heat-strengthened, or tempered glass can be used to produce laminated glass. While laminated glass will crack if struck with sufficient force, the resulting glass fragments tend to adhere to the interlayer rather than falling free and potentially causing injury.

In practice, the interlayer provides three beneficial properties to laminated glass panes: first, the interlayer functions to distribute impact forces across a greater area of the glass panes, thus increasing the impact resistance of the glass; second, the interlayer functions to bind the resulting shards if the glass is ultimately broken; third the viscoelastic interlayer undergoes plastic deformation during impact and under static loads after impact, absorbing energy and reducing penetration by the impacting object as well as reducing the energy of the impact that is transmitted to impacting object, e.g. a passenger in a car crash. Thus, the benefits of laminated glass include safety and security. Laminated glass also has decorative applications. The interlayer can be colored or patterned.

== History ==
PVB was invented in 1927 by the Canadian chemists Howard W. Matheson and Frederick W. Skirrow. PVB has been the dominant interlayer material since the late 1930s. It is manufactured and marketed by a number of companies worldwide, including:

- Saflex made by Eastman in Kingsport, Tennessee
- S-Lec films and powdered resins made by Sekisui in Kyoto, Japan, Winchester, Kentucky, Geleen & Roermond, The Netherlands and Cuernavaca, Mexico
- Kuraray Europe GmbH manufactures Trosifol and Mowital / Pioloform PVB products in Frankfurt, Germany
- Chang Chung Petrochemicals Co. Ltd of Taiwan manufactures WINLITE brand PVB products
- EVERLAM in Hamm-Uentrop, Germany markets its eponymous Everlam brand

The market for laminated glass products is mature. With only minor modifications, the PVB interlayer sold today is essentially identical to the PVB sold 30 years ago. Since its introduction in 1938, the worldwide market for PVB interlayer has been dominated by a handful of large chemical companies. As a result, inventive efforts have tended toward methods of making the interlayer itself cheaper to manufacture, or making the interlayer easier to handle and less prone to material defects during the process of fabricating laminated glass.

== Other interlayer materials ==
Other types of interlayer materials are in use, including polyurethanes such as Duraflex-brand thermoplastic polyurethane film, manufactured by Bayer MaterialScience, Leverkusen, Germany.

== See also ==
- Glass
- Polyvinyl chloride
