= General Company for Glass and Refractories =

Glass Factory in Ramadi, Iraq

The glass factory, officially called the General Company for Glass and Refractories, is an Iraqi government factory for the production of glass, refractories, and ceramics. It was established in 1971, at a cost of 6,700,000 dinars, in the city of Ramadi, affiliated with the Ministry of Industry and Minerals, 80 kilometers west of Baghdad. The production of 9,000 tons of glass panels and bottles began in an initial phase in February 1972. The workers were 1,375, then they reached 5,000 employees. In 1978, the factory relied on the raw materials found in that region, and in 1979 the production capacity reached 22,700 tons. Of glass, the director of the factory stated that its production was “classified from the finest types of glass.” After the Battle of the Mother of All Battles (also known as the Persian Gulf War) in 1991, and the imposition of an economic blockade on many raw materials, the government was forced to import materials with hard currency, and to buy used glass debris from citizens. It collected 2,325 tons between May and August.

In 1992, the factory was able to produce 90% of what it had produced before the war. The factory has been closed since 2003, and 2,500 employees belong to it. The factory contains 3 complexes: a glass complex, a ceramics complex, and a refractory complex. The factory was damaged as a result of the Islamic State's control over it after the Battle of Ramadi, which resulted in the destruction of most of the production factories. The company's director, Nazim Reda Hamad, said, "This company was subjected to acts of sabotage and destruction due to the entry of terrorist groups into it, which led to the destruction of most of the production plants. The company's staff were able to limit the damage and thus it was included in the investment files, which were presented based on the ministry's instructions." The factory is close to the Anbar desert, which is rich in local raw materials. The glass factory derives its water needs through direct pipes from the Euphrates River, which is very close by. The Technical Institute was also established in Ramadi to train and graduate intermediate technicians in glass technology. The purpose of its establishment was firstly: to qualify technical staff who are being appointed for the first time or who want to change the nature of their work, and secondly: to hold various technical, financial, commercial and administrative training courses for the company's employees. Economic expert Abdul Majeed Al-Anbari said, “The Ramadi Glass Factory constitutes a major investment in the natural resources available in Anbar... This industrial institution produces glass extracted from the city of Ramadi, which is considered one of the purest glass in the world.”

== The site and its construction ==
Natural glass is an ancient material, and Iraq is considered one of the oldest glass-manufacturing countries, as its manufacture began in Iraq more than 3,500 years ago. Iraq has a large reserve of pure white sand suitable for the manufacture of glass. Italian engineers said that the soil of Anbar is one of the regions in the world richest in silicic acid. Iraq was one of the few Arab countries that took the initiative to benefit from glass sand. It was planned that the glass factory would be established in Rutba and not Ramadi, which is about 300 km from Rutba. The preference for the location of Ramadi over Rutba has several reasons, including that Rutba is located in the middle of the desert. Western Region, where it is difficult to obtain water, and making glass requires a lot of water. Producing one ton of glass requires 98,000 liters of water. Baghdad Magazine reported in 1967 that geologists “surveyed the Wadi Houran area in Rutba and found that there were approximately 5 million tons of sand suitable for making glass at a depth of 10 meters.” In 1969, the chief engineer of the glass factory project said that the first phase, which includes the project management building, garages, sedimentation basins, and the factory fence, has now been completed, and that the second phase, which includes the fuel tanks, cooling tower, and glass paste making shops, has now been 60% completed, and work has begun. In the third stage. A team of 60 Russian experts were used to build the factory, who trained Iraqi cadres to work in it and manage it. The Journal of the California Institute of International Studies reported that Iraq would no longer need to import glass. In 1987, a contract for the expansion of the factory was awarded to Belgian contractors, so production increased and products diversified. During the imposition of the economic blockade on Iraq, Glass Industry magazine reported that a Russian team went to the glass factory in an effort to modernize and expand it. On March 18, 2021, investment contracts were concluded between the glass factory and Russian companies to rehabilitate and operate the company's factories and establish new ones.

=== Ramadi west of the Euphrates ===
The city of Ramadi was limited to the eastern side of the Euphrates, and when the glass factory was established west of the Euphrates, 7 kilometers away, urban growth began in the 1970s near the factory, and then the area increased in growth after the establishment of Anbar University. The area in which the glass factory is located is called the glass factory area, according to the municipal designation, and it is an industrial area.
