= Silt fence =

Sediment control device on construction sites

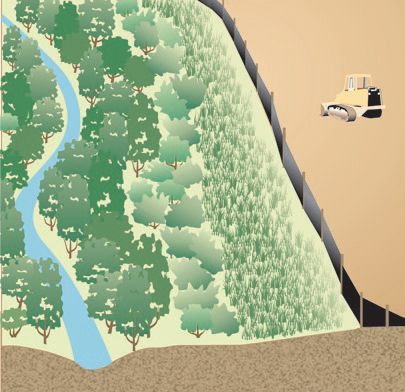
Silt fence installed up-slope of a vegetated stream buffer

A silt fence, sometimes (misleadingly) called a filter fence, is a temporary sediment control device used on construction sites to protect water quality in nearby streams, rivers, lakes and seas from sediment (loose soil) in stormwater runoff. Silt fences are widely used on construction sites in North America and elsewhere, due to their low cost and simple design. However, their effectiveness in controlling sediment can be limited, due to problems with poor installation, proper placement, and/or inadequate maintenance.

== Design and installation ==
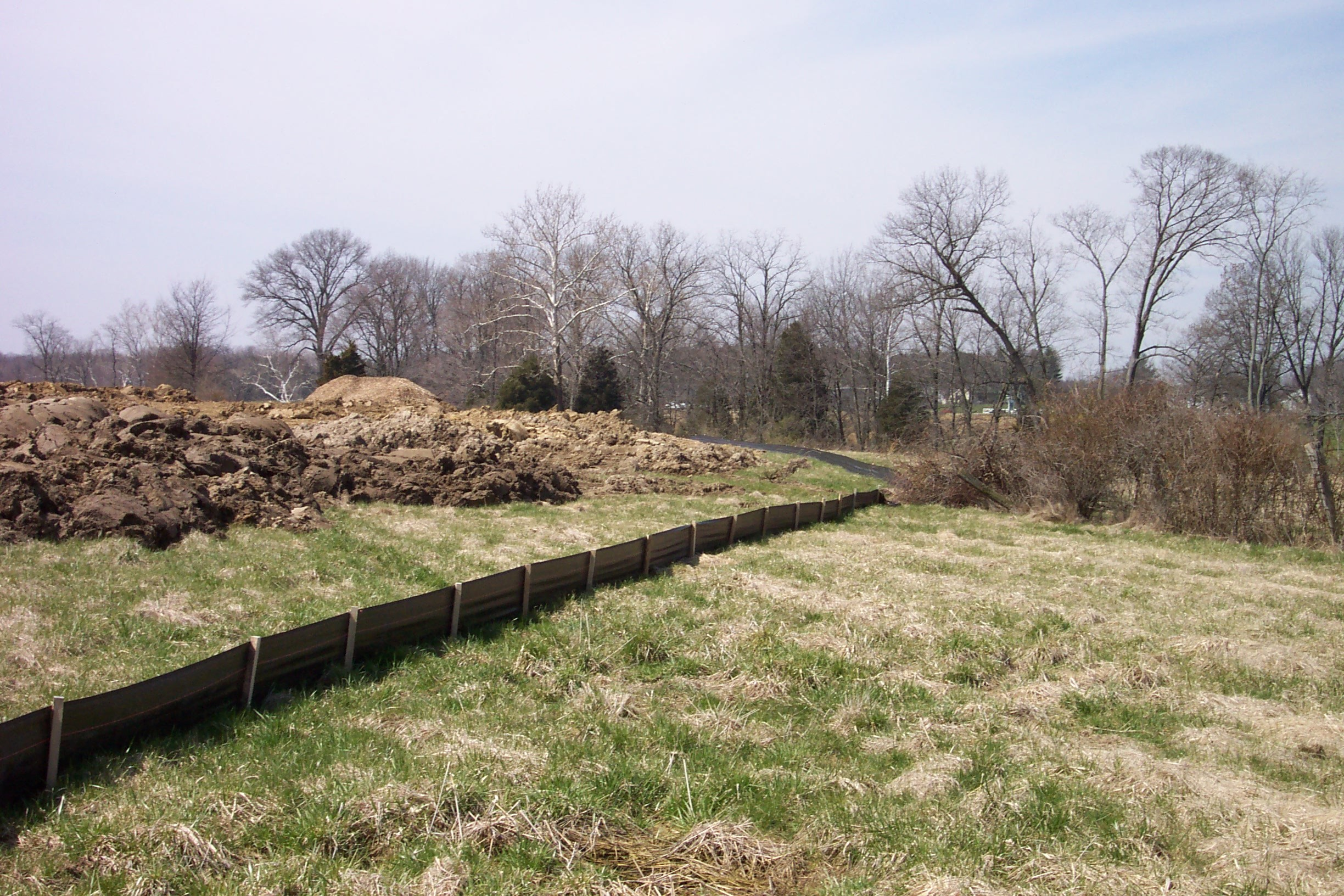
Silt fence installed on a construction site

Silt fences are often installed as perimeter controls. They are typically used in combination with sediment basins and sediment traps, as well as with erosion controls, which are designed to retain sediment in place where soil is being disturbed by construction processes (i.e., land grading and other earthworks).

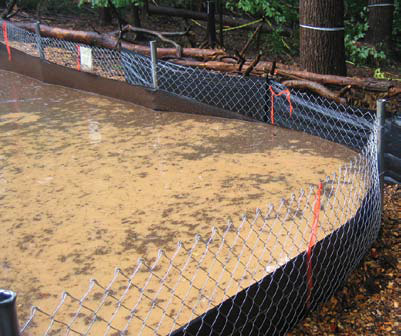
Chain link supported "super" silt fence

A typical fence consists of a piece of synthetic filter fabric (also called a geotextile) stretched between a series of wooden or metal fence stakes along a horizontal contour level. The stakes are installed on the downhill side of the fence, and the bottom edge of the fabric can be trenched into the soil and backfilled on the uphill side, although it is quite difficult to move the trenched "spoil" from the downside to the upside of the trench. The design/placement of the silt fence should create a pooling of runoff, which then allows sedimentation to occur. Water can seep through the silt fence fabric, but the fabric often becomes "blocked off" with fine soil particles (all sediment-retention devices have this challenge, and none of them "filter" storm water for very long). A few hours after a storm event, the fabric can be "disturbed" in order to dislodge the fines, and allow clean water to flow through. Depending on the protected watershed and erosion, larger soil particles will settle out, ultimately filling the silt fence to the top of the structure; requiring another silt fence above or below it (creating a new ponding area), or for the silt fence to be removed, the sediment removed or spread out, and a new fence installed. The fence is not designed to concentrate or channel stormwater. The fence is installed on a site before soil disturbance begins, and is placed down-slope from the disturbance area.

Sediment is captured by silt fences most often through ponding of water and settling, rather than filtration by the fabric. Sand and silt tends to clog the fabric, and then the sediments settle in the temporary pond.

=== Super silt fence ===
Some government jurisdictions in the United States recommend or require the use of a reinforced fence, sometimes called a "super" silt fence or an enhanced silt fence, on some construction sites. This design uses filter fabric reinforced by a wire mesh or chain link fence. The metal backing gives the fence increased strength to resist the weight of soil and water which may be trapped by the fence in a large drainage area, and discourages construction site operators from driving vehicles over the fence. However, an improper installation of a super silt fence can create an inadvertent sediment basin when the filter fabric becomes clogged. This typically causes flooding and increased downstream pollution. Most super silt fence specifications are outdated, requiring the trenching installation method, which has been shown to be highly susceptible to "washing out" under the fabric due to improper back-filling and inadequate compaction.

=== Static slicing installation ===
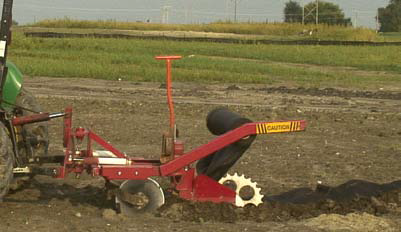
Static slicing machine

Some state agencies recommend an installation technique called "static slicing" as an improved method for ensuring effectiveness and longevity of a silt fence system on a construction site. The technique involves inserting a narrow blade into the soil with a wedge-type point on its tip to slightly disrupt the soil upward, while simultaneously inserting the silt fence fabric into the slot with a moving pivot, while the machine is moving forward. This step is followed by mechanical soil compaction, setting of fence posts, and attaching the fabric.

== Effectiveness ==
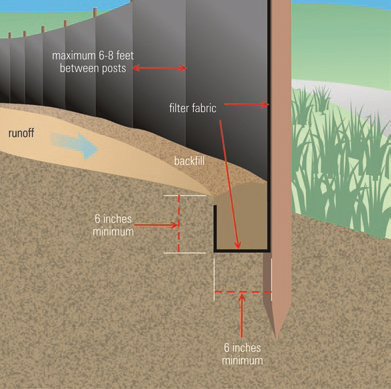
Installation detail for a silt fence with specifications recommended by US EPA

Silt fence fabrics (geotextiles) tested in laboratory settings have shown to be effective at trapping sediment particles. Although there have been few field tests of silt fences installed at construction sites, these tests have shown generally poor results. (Effectiveness testing involved measurements for both total suspended solids and turbidity.) Other studies and articles about silt fence usage and practice document problems with installation and maintenance, implying poor performance.

Since 1998, static slicing the material into the ground has proven to be the most efficient and most effective installation method because slicing maintains the soil on both sides of the fence, and is conducive to proper compaction—which is critical to performance, as well. In 2000 the U.S. Environmental Protection Agency (EPA) co-sponsored silt fence efficacy field research through its Environmental Technology Verification Program, and in general, the report found the static slicing method to be highly effective, and efficient. Silt fence effectiveness is best determined by how many hundreds of pounds of sediment are contained behind a given silt fence after a storm event, and not turbidity, etc. as sediment-retention is the end goal, and not a water-quality measurement used in erosion control, for instance.

Silt fences may perform poorly for a variety of reasons, including improper location (e.g. placing fence where it will not pond runoff water), improper installation (e.g. failure to adequately embed and backfill the lower edge of fabric in the soil) and lack of maintenance—fabric falling off of the posts, or posts knocked down. A silt fence top-full of sediment may need maintenance/replacement, but it is a huge success. The fabric may become damaged with holes and tears if construction materials are stored next to or on top of the fence. During various phases of construction at a site, a silt fence may be removed relocated and reinstalled multiple times. It may be difficult to maintain effectiveness of a silt fence under such operating conditions. Location of fences in areas with high flows may lead to fence failures when the installation is not adequately back-filled and properly compacted, and/or the post-spacing is inadequate.

== See also ==
- Geosynthetics
- Geotechnical engineering
- Nonpoint source pollution
- Sediment basin
- Stormwater
