= Agricultural wastewater treatment =

Farm management process

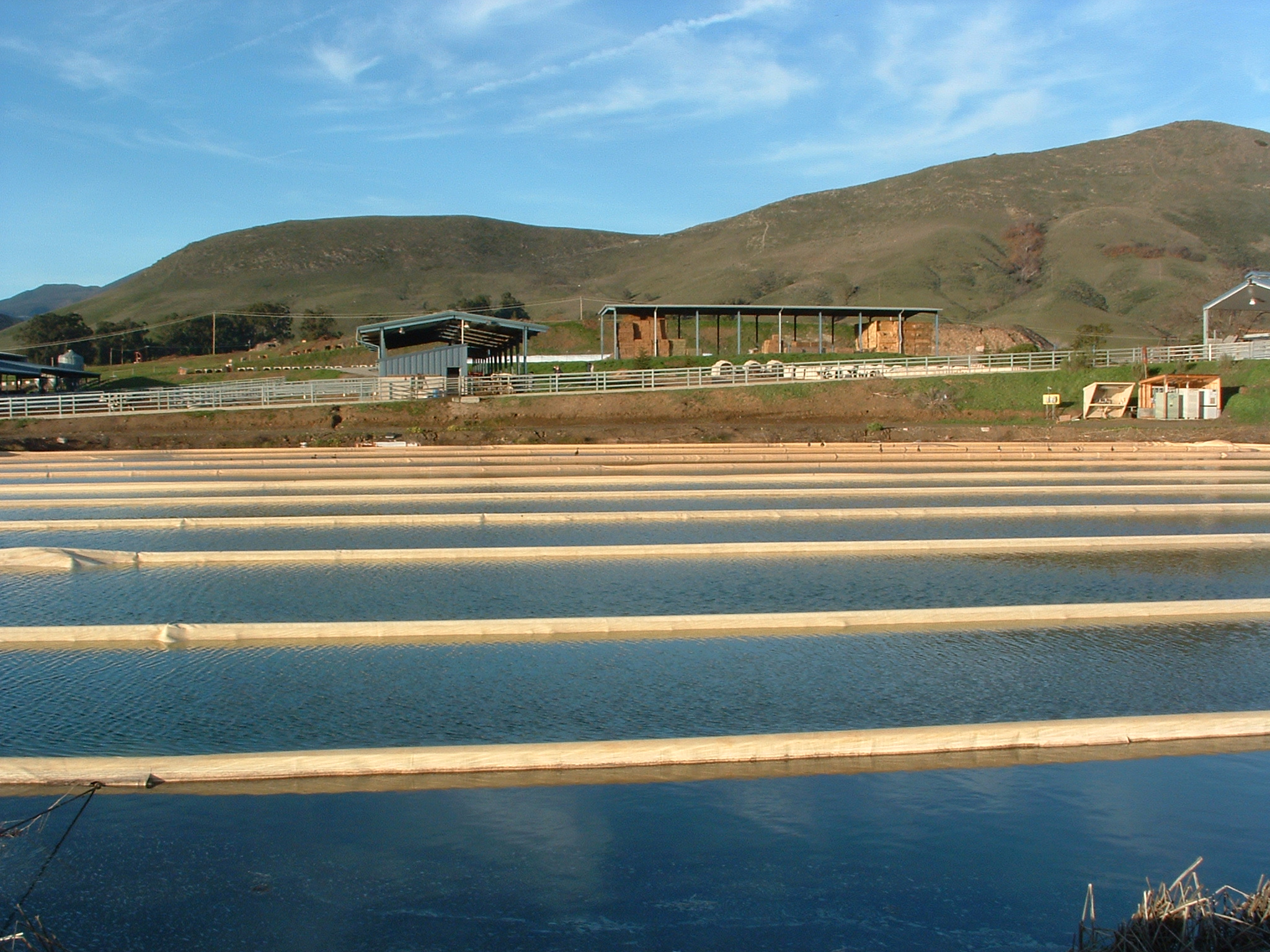
Anaerobic lagoon for treatment of dairy wastes

Agricultural wastewater treatment is a farm management agenda for controlling pollution from confined animal operations and from surface runoff that may be contaminated by chemicals or organisms in fertilizer, pesticides, animal slurry, crop residues or irrigation water. Agricultural wastewater treatment is required for continuous confined animal operations like milk and egg production. It may be performed in plants using mechanized treatment units similar to those used for industrial wastewater. Where land is available for ponds, settling basins and facultative lagoons may have lower operational costs for seasonal use conditions from breeding or harvest cycles. Animal slurries are usually treated by containment in anaerobic lagoons before disposal by spray or trickle application to grassland. Constructed wetlands are sometimes used to facilitate treatment of animal wastes.

Nonpoint source pollution includes sediment runoff, nutrient runoff and pesticides. Point source pollution includes animal wastes, silage liquor, milking parlour (dairy farming) wastes, slaughtering waste, vegetable washing water and firewater. Many farms generate nonpoint source pollution from surface runoff which is not controlled through a treatment plant.

Farmers can install erosion controls to reduce runoff flows and retain soil on their fields. Common techniques include contour plowing, crop mulching, crop rotation, planting perennial crops and installing riparian buffers. Farmers can also develop and implement nutrient management plans to reduce excess application of nutrients and reduce the potential for nutrient pollution. To minimize pesticide impacts, farmers may use Integrated Pest Management (IPM) techniques (which can include biological pest control) to maintain control over pests, reduce reliance on chemical pesticides, and protect water quality.

== Nonpoint source pollution ==
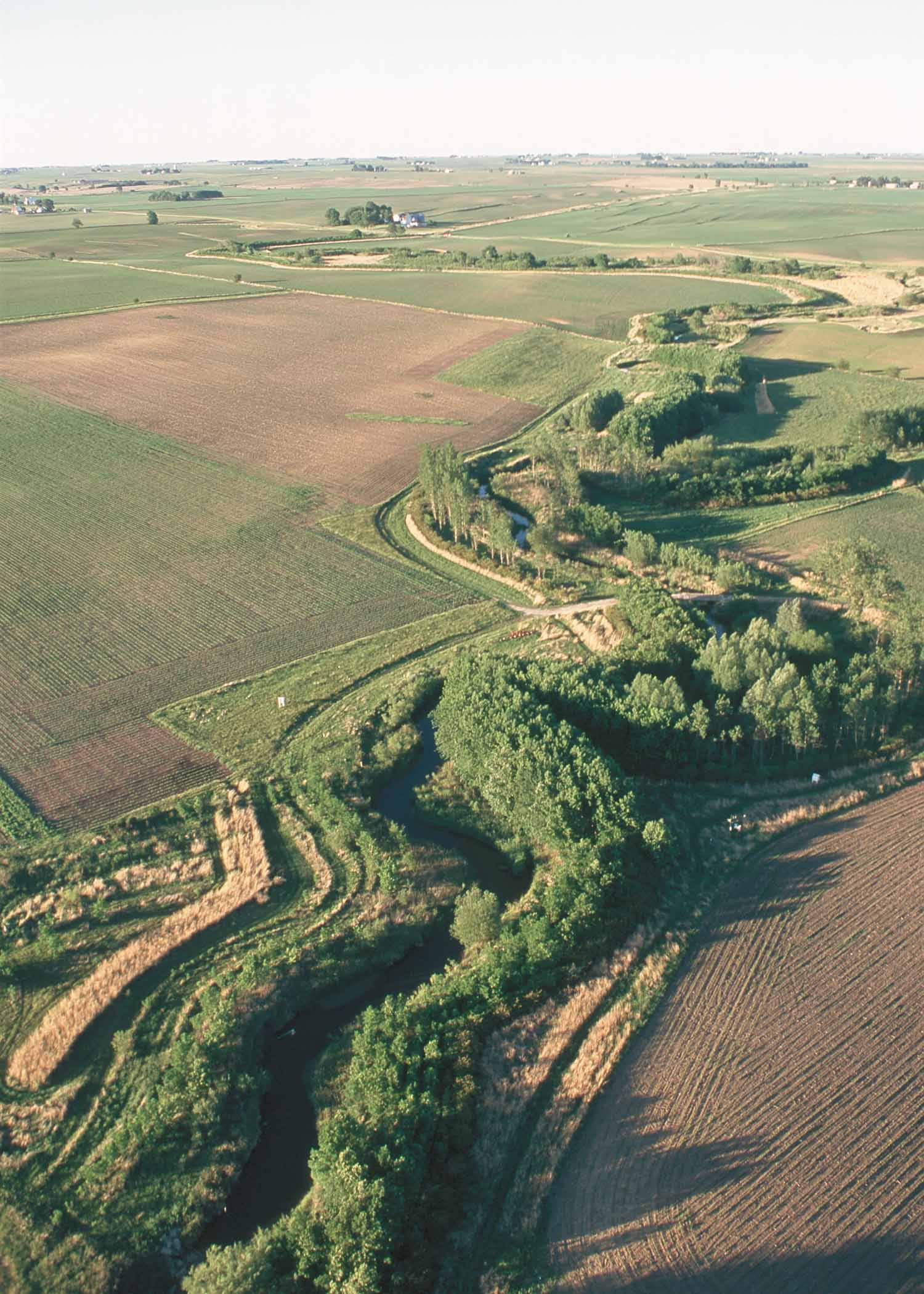
Riparian buffer lining a creek in Iowa

Nonpoint source pollution from farms is caused by surface runoff from fields during rainstorms. Agricultural runoff is a major source of pollution, in some cases the only source, in many watersheds.

=== Sediment runoff ===
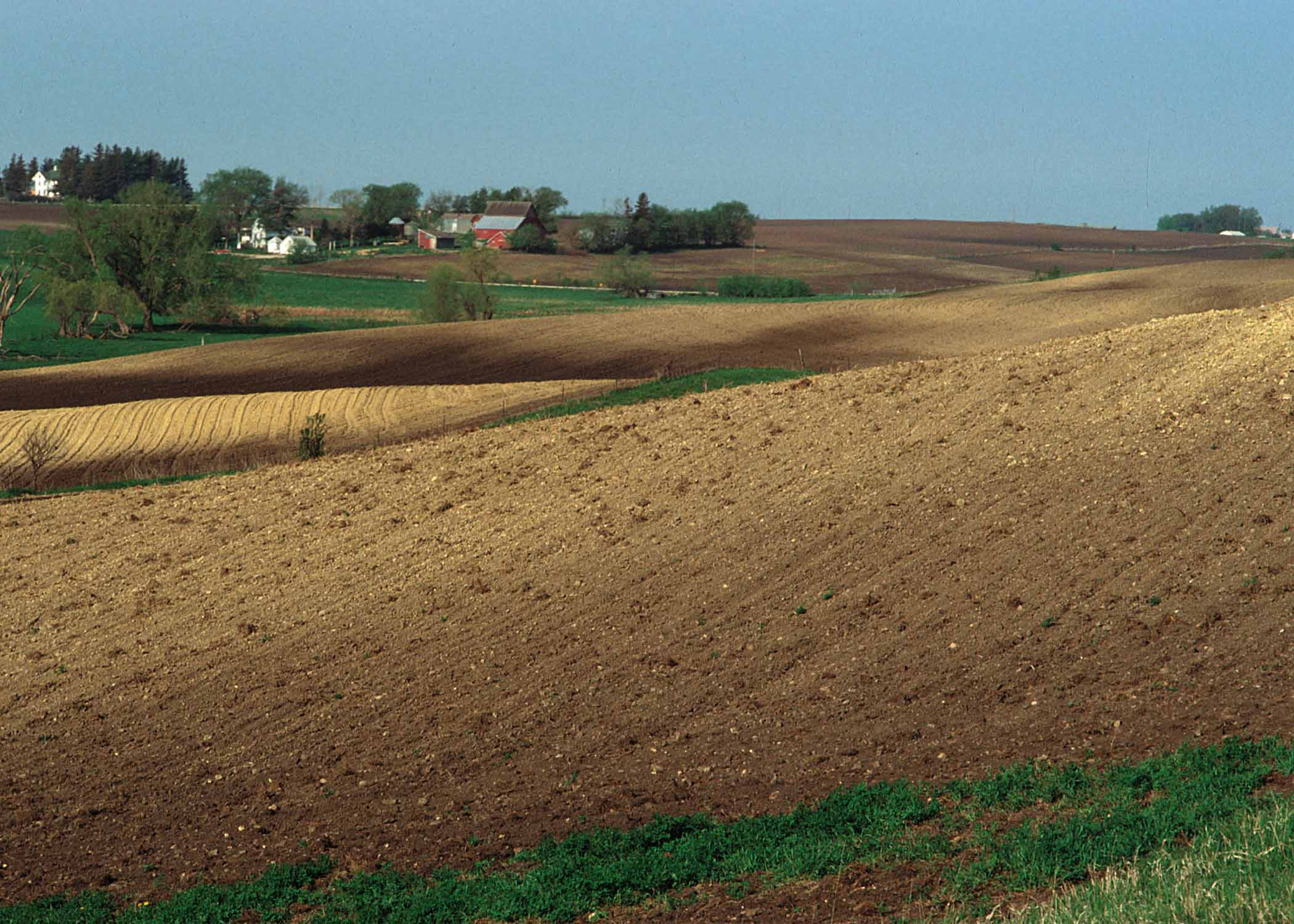
Highly erodible soils on a farm in Iowa

Soil washed off fields is the largest source of agricultural pollution in the United States. Excess sediment causes high levels of turbidity in water bodies, which can inhibit growth of aquatic plants, clog fish gills and smother animal larvae.

Farmers may utilize erosion controls to reduce runoff flows and retain soil on their fields. Common techniques include:

- contour ploughing
- crop mulching
- crop rotation
- planting perennial crops
- installing riparian buffers.

=== Nutrient runoff ===
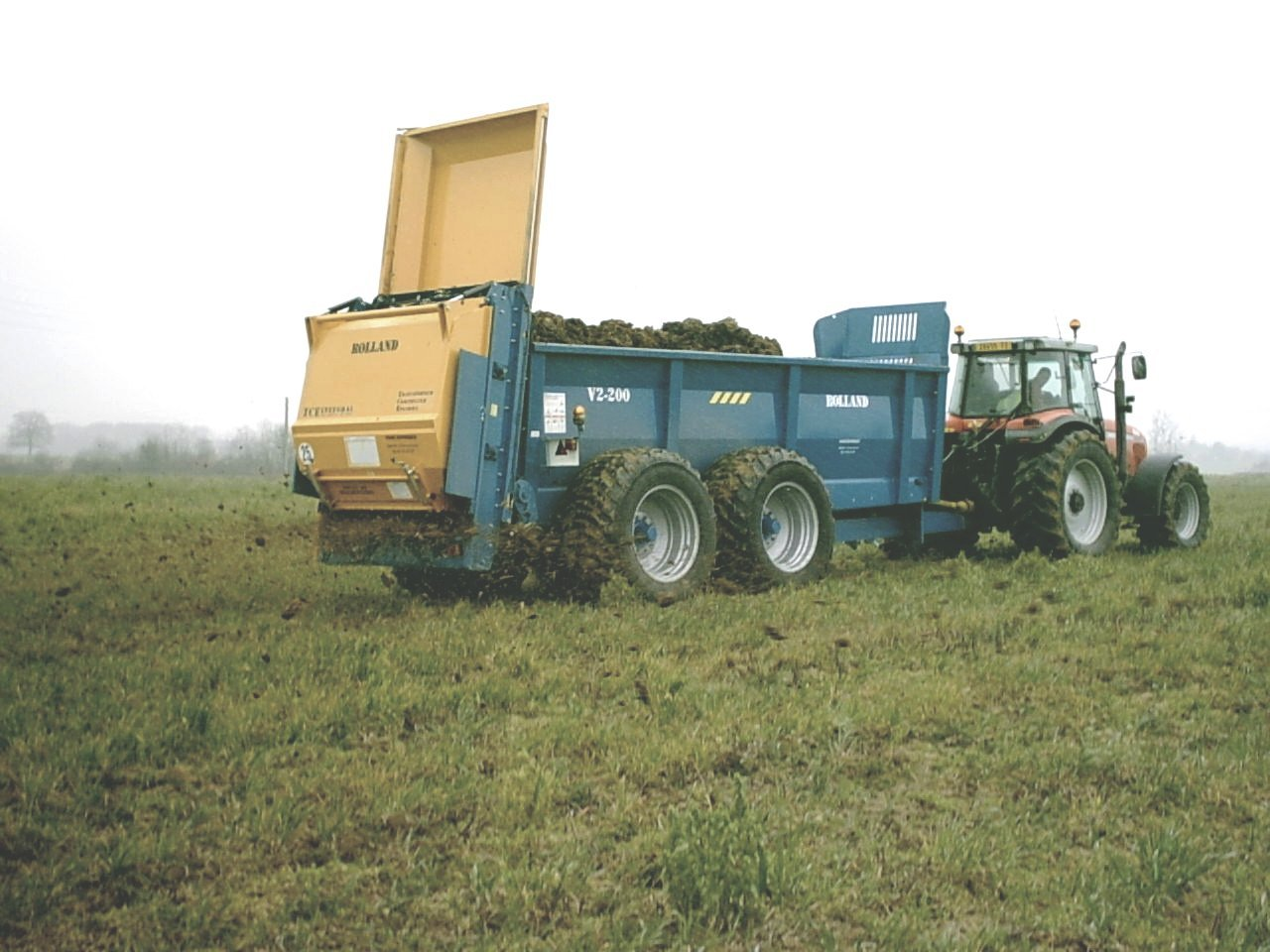
Manure spreader

Nitrogen and phosphorus are key pollutants found in runoff, and they are applied to farmland in several ways, such as in the form of commercial fertilizer, animal manure, or municipal or industrial wastewater (effluent) or sludge. These chemicals may also enter runoff from crop residues, irrigation water, wildlife, and atmospheric deposition.

Farmers can develop and implement nutrient management plans to mitigate impacts on water quality by:

- mapping and documenting fields, crop types, soil types, and water bodies
- developing realistic crop yield projections
- conducting soil tests and nutrient analyses of manures and/or sludges applied
- identifying other significant nutrient sources (e.g., irrigation water)
- evaluating significant field features such as highly erodible soils, subsurface drains, and shallow aquifers
- applying fertilizers, manures, and/or sludges based on realistic yield goals and using precision agriculture techniques.

=== Pesticides ===
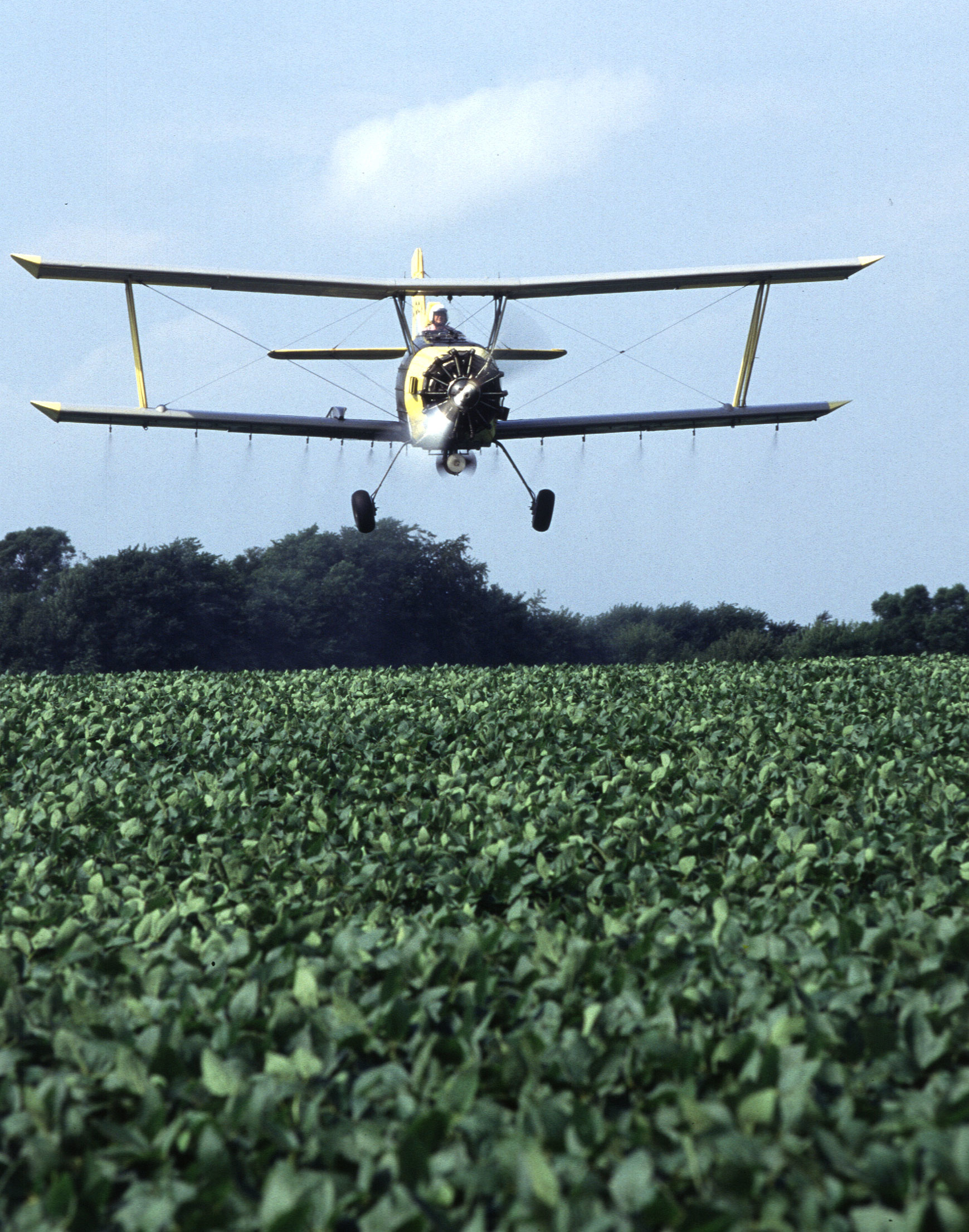
Aerial application (crop dusting) of pesticides over a soybean field in the U.S.

Pesticides are widely used by farmers to control plant pests and enhance production, but chemical pesticides can also cause water quality problems. Pesticides may appear in surface water due to:

- direct application (e.g. aerial spraying or broadcasting over water bodies)
- runoff during rainstorms
- aerial drift (from adjacent fields).

Some pesticides have also been detected in groundwater.

Farmers may use Integrated Pest Management (IPM) techniques (which can include biological pest control) to maintain control over pests, reduce reliance on chemical pesticides, and protect water quality.

There are few safe ways of disposing of pesticide surpluses other than through containment in well-managed landfills or by incineration. In some parts of the world, spraying on land is a permitted method of disposal.

== Point source pollution and treatment steps ==
Farms with large livestock and poultry operations, such as factory farms, can be a major source of point source wastewater. In the United States, these facilities are called concentrated animal feeding operations or confined animal feeding operations and are being subjected to increasing government regulation.

Antibiotic-resistant bacteria have been found to infiltrate the water cycle from farms. Raising animals accounts for 73% of antibiotic use globally, and wastewater treatment facilities can transfer antibiotic-resistant bacteria to humans.

=== Animal wastes ===
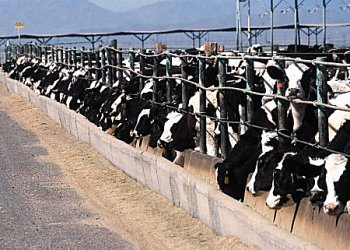
Confined animal feeding operation in the United States

The constituents of animal wastewater typically contain

- Strong organic content — much stronger than human sewage
- High solids concentration
- High nitrate and phosphorus content
- Antibiotics
- Synthetic hormones
- Often high concentrations of parasites and their eggs
- Spores of Cryptosporidium (a protozoan) resistant to drinking water treatment processes
- Spores of Giardia
- Human pathogenic bacteria such as Brucella and Salmonella

Animal wastes from cattle can be produced as solid or semisolid manure or as a liquid slurry. The production of slurry is especially common in housed dairy cattle.

==== Treatment ====
Whilst solid manure heaps outdoors can give rise to polluting wastewaters from runoff, this type of waste is usually relatively easy to treat by containment and/or covering of the heap.

Animal slurries require special handling and are usually treated by containment in lagoons before disposal by spray or trickle application to grassland. Constructed wetlands are sometimes used to facilitate treatment of animal wastes, as are anaerobic lagoons. Excessive application or application to sodden land or insufficient land area can result in direct runoff to watercourses, with the potential for causing severe pollution. Application of slurries to land overlying aquifers can result in direct contamination or, more commonly, elevation of nitrogen levels as nitrite or nitrate.

The disposal of any wastewater containing animal waste upstream of a drinking water intake can pose serious health problems for those drinking the water because of the highly resistant spores present in many animals that are capable of causing disabling disease in humans. This risk exists even for very low-level seepage via shallow surface drains or from rainfall run-off.

Some animal slurries are treated by mixing with straw and composted at high temperature to produce a bacteriologically sterile and friable manure for soil improvement.

==== Piggery waste ====
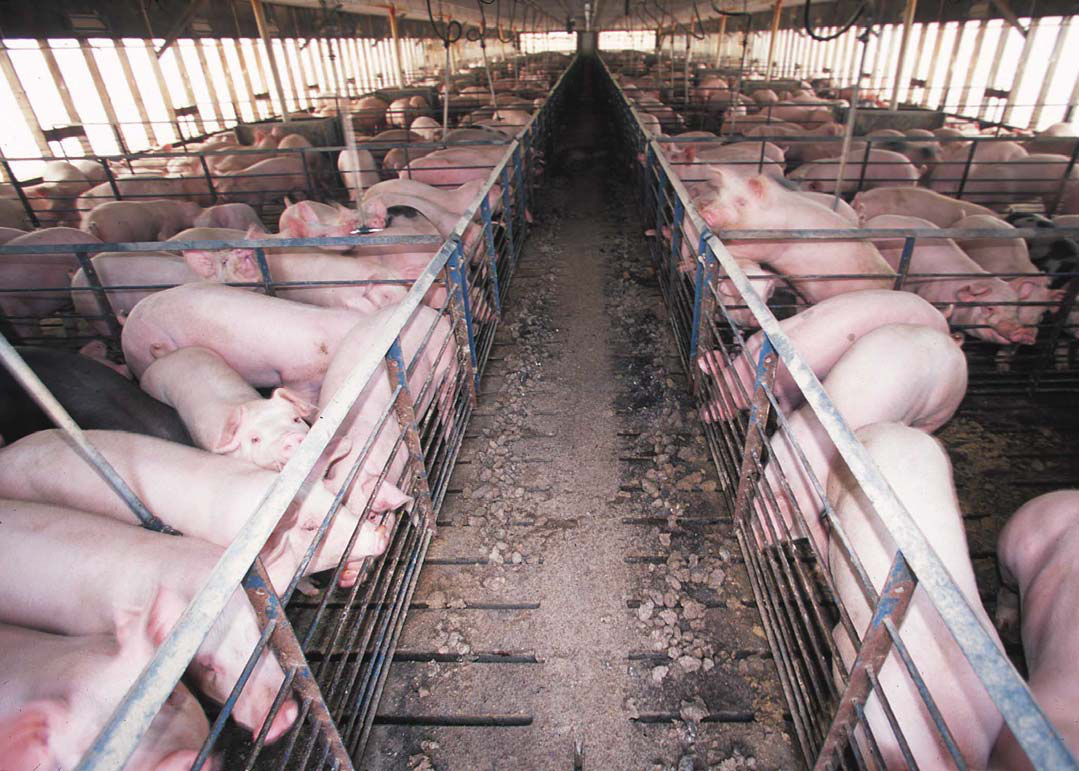
Hog confinement barn or piggery

Piggery waste is comparable to other animal wastes and is processed as for general animal waste, except that many piggery wastes contain elevated levels of copper that can be toxic in the natural environment. The liquid fraction of the waste is frequently separated off and re-used in the piggery to avoid the prohibitively high costs of disposing of copper-rich liquid. Ascarid worms and their eggs are also common in piggery waste and can infect humans if wastewater treatment is ineffective.

=== Silage liquor ===
Fresh or wilted grass or other green crops can be made into a semi-fermented product called silage which can be stored and used as winter forage for cattle and sheep. The production of silage often involves the use of an acid conditioner such as sulfuric acid or formic acid. The process of silage making frequently produces a yellow-brown strongly smelling liquid which is very rich in simple sugars, alcohol, short-chain organic acids and silage conditioner. This liquor is one of the most polluting organic substances known. The volume of silage liquor produced is generally in proportion to the moisture content of the ensiled material.

Silage liquor is best treated through prevention by wilting crops well before silage making. Any silage liquor that is produced can be used as part of the food for pigs. The most effective treatment is by containment in a slurry lagoon and by subsequent spreading on land following substantial dilution with slurry. Containment of silage liquor on its own can cause structural problems in concrete pits because of the acidic nature of silage liquor.

=== Milking parlour (dairy farming) wastes ===
Although milk is an important food product, its presence in wastewaters is highly polluting because of its organic strength, which can lead to very rapid deoxygenation of receiving waters. Milking parlour wastes also contain large volumes of wash-down water, some animal waste together with cleaning and disinfection chemicals.

Milking parlour wastes are often treated in admixture with human sewage in a local sewage treatment plant. This ensures that disinfectants and cleaning agents are sufficiently diluted and amenable to treatment. Running milking wastewaters into a farm slurry lagoon is a possible option although this tends to consume lagoon capacity very quickly. Land spreading is also a treatment option.

=== Slaughtering waste ===
Wastewater from slaughtering activities is similar to milking parlour waste (see above) although considerably stronger in its organic composition and therefore potentially much more polluting.

Treatment is as for milking parlour waste.

=== Vegetable washing water ===
Washing of vegetables produces large volumes of water contaminated by soil and vegetable pieces. Low levels of pesticides used to treat the vegetables may also be present together with moderate levels of disinfectants such as chlorine.

Most vegetable washing waters are extensively recycled with the solids removed by settlement and filtration. The recovered soil can be returned to the land.

=== Firewater ===
Although few farms plan for fires, fires are nevertheless more common on farms than on many other industrial premises. Stores of pesticides, herbicides, fuel oil for farm machinery and fertilizers can all help promote fire and can all be present in environmentally lethal quantities in firewater from fire fighting at farms.

All farm environmental management plans should allow for containment of substantial quantities of firewater and for its subsequent recovery and disposal by specialist disposal companies. The concentration and mixture of contaminants in firewater make it unsuited to any treatment method available on the farm. Even land spreading has produced severe taste and odour problems for downstream water supply companies in the past.

== See also ==
- Agricultural waste
- Agricultural surface runoff
- Dark fermentation
- Sustainable agriculture
