= Water pollution =

Contamination of water bodies

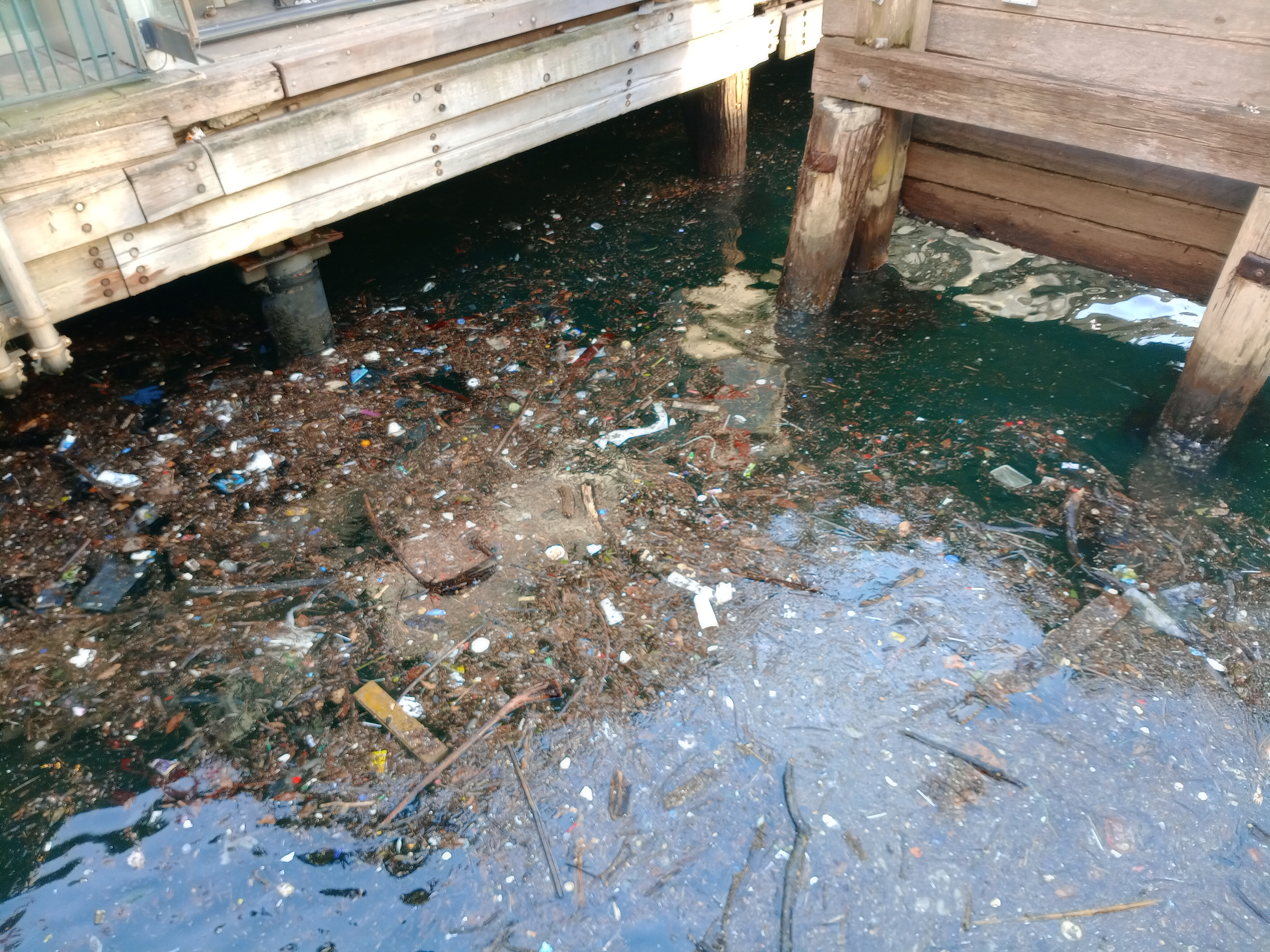
Garbage floating in water, Circular Quay, Sydney, Australia

Water pollution (or aquatic pollution) is the contamination of water bodies, which has a negative impact on how they can be used. It is usually caused by human activities. Water bodies include surface water (lakes, rivers, oceans, reservoirs) and groundwater. Water pollution results when contaminants mix with these water bodies. Contaminants can come from one of four main sources. These are sewage discharges, industrial activities, agricultural activities, and urban runoff including stormwater.

This form of pollution can lead to many problems. One is the degradation of aquatic ecosystems. Another is spreading water-borne diseases when people use polluted water for drinking or irrigation. Water pollution also reduces the ecosystem services such as drinking water provided by the water resource.

Sources of water pollution are either point sources or non-point sources. Point sources have one identifiable cause, such as a storm drain, a wastewater treatment plant, or an oil spill. Non-point sources are more diffuse. An example is agricultural runoff. Pollution is the result of the cumulative effect over time.

Pollution may take many forms. One would be toxic substances such as oil, metals, plastics, pesticides, persistent organic pollutants, and industrial waste products. Another is stressful conditions such as changes of pH, hypoxia or anoxia, increased temperatures, excessive turbidity, or changes of salinity). The introduction of pathogenic organisms is another. Contaminants may include organic and inorganic substances. A common cause of thermal pollution is the use of water as a coolant by power plants and industrial manufacturers.

The control of water pollution requires appropriate infrastructure and management plans, as well as legislation. Technology solutions can include improving sanitation, sewage treatment, industrial wastewater treatment, agricultural wastewater treatment, erosion control, sediment control and control of urban runoff (including stormwater management).

== Definition ==
A practical definition of water pollution is: "Water pollution is the addition of substances or energy forms that directly or indirectly alter the nature of the water body in such a manner that negatively affects its legitimate uses." Water is usually considered polluted when it is contaminated by anthropogenic substances. This means that it either cannot be used for certain purposes, such as for drinking, or its ability to support its biotic communities, such as fish, has changed significantly.

== Contaminants ==
=== Contaminants with an origin in sewage ===
The following compounds can all reach water bodies via raw sewage or even treated sewage discharges:

- Various chemical compounds found in personal hygiene and cosmetic products.
- Disinfection by-products found in chemically disinfected drinking water (whilst these chemicals can be a pollutant in the water distribution network, they are fairly volatile and therefore not usually found in environmental waters).
- Hormones (from animal husbandry and residue from human hormonal contraception methods) and synthetic materials such as phthalates that mimic hormones in their action. These can have adverse impacts even at very low concentrations on the natural biota and potentially on humans if the water is treated and utilized for drinking water.
- Insecticides and herbicides, often from agricultural runoff.
- Pathogens like Hepatovirus A (HAV may be present in treated wastewater outflows and receiving water bodies but is largely removed during further treatment of drinking water)

Inadequately treated wastewater can convey nutrients, pathogens, heterogenous suspended solids and organic fecal matter.

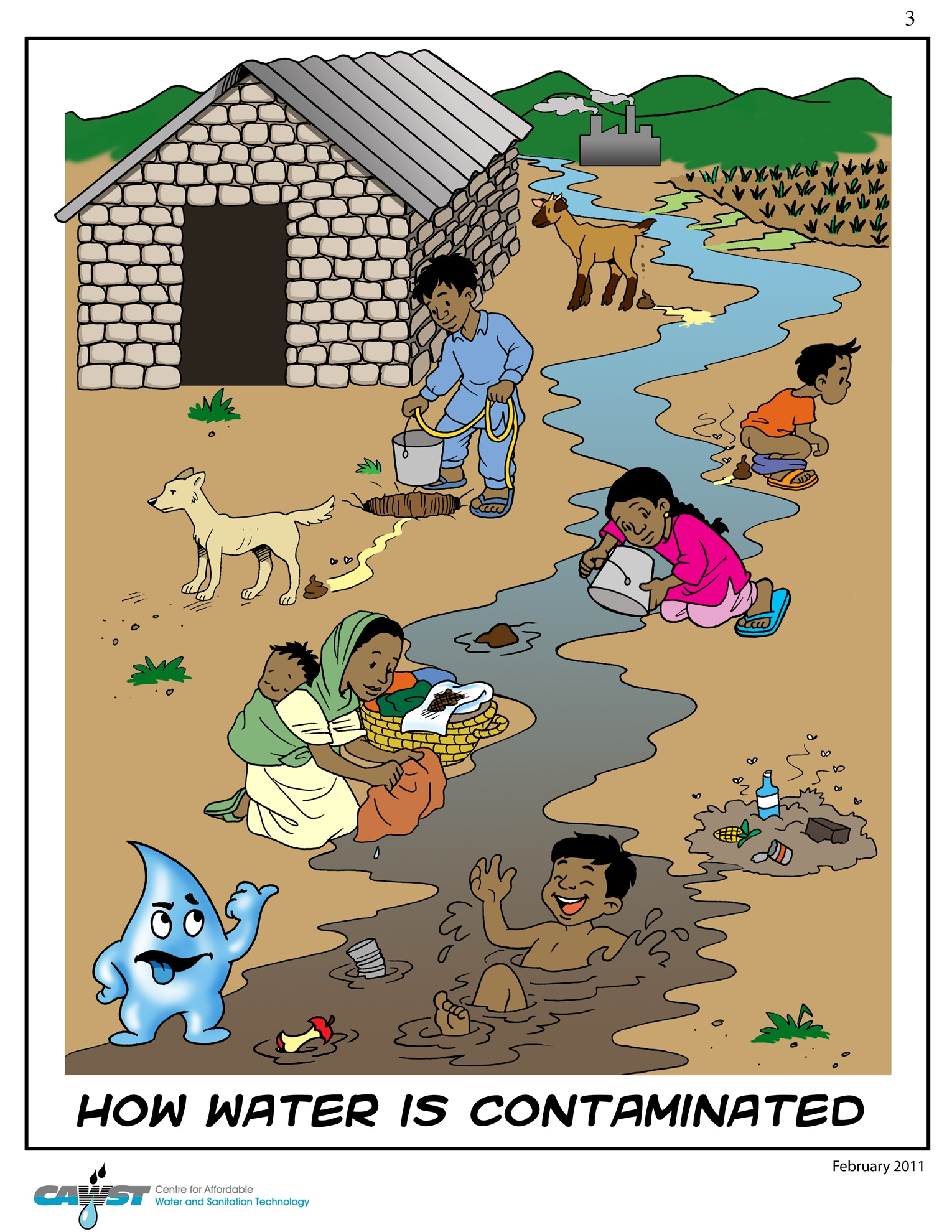
Poster to teach people in South Asia about human activities leading to the pollution of water sources

Pollutants and their effects*
Pollutant	Main representative parameter	Possible effect of the pollutant
Suspended solids	Total suspended solids	Aesthetic problems; Sludge deposits; Pollutants adsorption; Protection of pathogens
Biodegradable organic matter	Biological oxygen demand (BOD)	Oxygen consumption; Death of fish; Septic conditions
Nutrients	Nitrogen; Phosphorus	Excessive algae growth; Toxicity to fish (ammonia); Illnesses in new-born infants (blue baby syndrome from nitrate); Pollution of groundwater
Pathogens	Coliforms, such as E. coli, may not be pathogenic in and of themselves, but are used as an indicator of co-occurring pathogens that die or degrade more quickly; Helminth eggs	Waterborne diseases
Non-biodegradable organic matter	Pesticides; Some detergents; Others	Toxicity (various); Foam (detergents); Reduction of oxygen transfer (detergents); Non-biodegradability; Bad odors (e.g.: phenols)
Inorganic dissolved solids	Total dissolved solids; Conductivity	Excessive salinity – harm to plantations (irrigation); Toxicity to plants (some ions); Problems with soil permeability (sodium)
* Sources of these pollutants are household and industrial wastewater, urban runoff and stormwater drainage from agricultural areas

==== Pathogens ====
Examples of pathogens that can be found in wastewater are bacteria, viruses, protozoans and parasitic worms. In practice, indicator organisms are used to investigate pathogenic pollution of water because detecting pathogenic organisms in water samples is difficult and costly due to their low concentrations. The most commonly used (bacterial indicator) of fecal contamination in water samples most commonly used are total coliforms (TC) or fecal coliforms (FC), the latter of which are also referred to as thermotolerant coliforms, such as Escherichia coli.

Pathogens can produce waterborne diseases in either human or animal hosts. Some microorganisms sometimes found in contaminated surface waters that have caused human health problems include Burkholderia pseudomallei, Cryptosporidium parvum, Giardia lamblia, Salmonella, norovirus and other viruses, and parasitic worms including the Schistosoma type.

High levels of pathogens in water bodies can be caused by human feces (due to open defecation), sewage, blackwater, or manure that has found its way into the water. This can be due to a lack of adequate sanitation procedures or poorly functioning on-site sanitation systems (septic tanks, pit latrines), sewage treatment plants without disinfection steps, sanitary sewer overflows and combined sewer overflows (CSOs) during storm events and intensive agriculture (poorly managed livestock operations).

=== Organic compounds ===
Organic substances that enter water bodies are often toxic.

- Petroleum hydrocarbons, including fuels (gasoline, diesel fuel, jet fuels, and fuel oil) and lubricants (motor oil), and fuel combustion byproducts, from oil spills or storm water runoff
- Volatile organic compounds, such as improperly stored industrial solvents. Problematic species are organochlorides such as polychlorinated biphenyl (PCBs) and trichloroethylene, a common solvent.

Per- and polyfluoroalkyl substances (PFAS) are persistent organic pollutants.

=== Inorganic contaminants ===
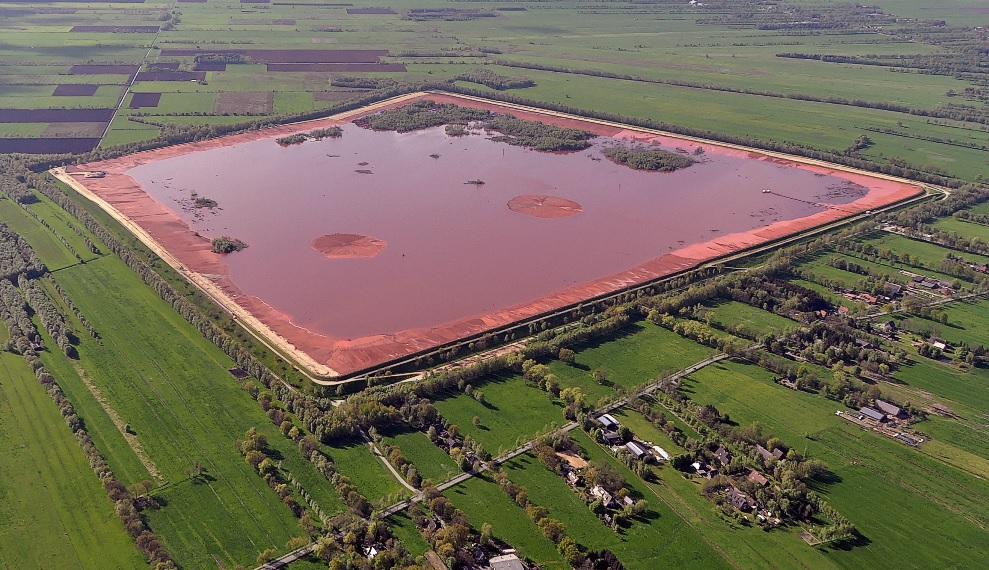
Bauxite residue is an industrial waste that is dangerously alkaline and can lead to water pollution if not managed appropriately (photo from Stade, Germany).

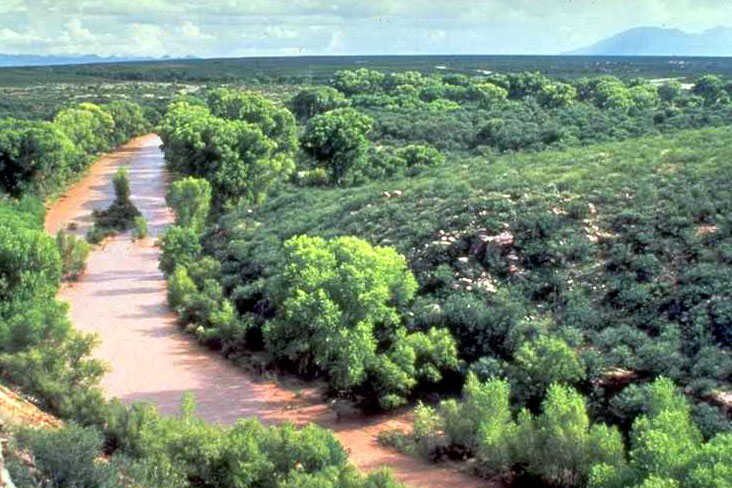
Muddy river polluted by sediment

Inorganic water pollutants include:

- Ammonia from food processing waste
- Heavy metals from motor vehicles (via urban storm water runoff) and acid mine drainage
- Nitrates and phosphates, from sewage and agriculture (see nutrient pollution)
- Silt (sediment) in runoff from construction sites or sewage, logging, slash and burn practices land clearing sites
- Salt: Freshwater salinization is the process of salty runoff contaminating freshwater ecosystems. Human-induced salinization is termed as secondary salinization, with the use of de-icing road salts as the most common form of runoff.

=== Pharmaceutical pollutants ===
The environmental effects of pharmaceutical and personal care products (PPCPs) has been of concern since at least the 1990s. PPCPs include substances used by individuals for personal health or cosmetic reasons and the products used by agribusiness to boost growth or health of livestock. More than twenty million tons of PPCPs are produced every year. The European Union has declared that pharmacological residues with the potential for contamination of water and the soil are "priority substances".^{[3]}

PPCPs have been detected in waters throughout the world. More research is needed to evaluate the risks of toxicity, persistence, and bioaccumulation, but current research shows that personal care products affect the environment and other species, such as coral reefs and fish. PPCPs encompass environmental persistent pharmaceutical pollutants (EPPPs) and are one type of persistent organic pollutants. They are not removed in conventional sewage treatment plants but require a fourth treatment stage which not many plants have.

In 2022, the most comprehensive study of pharmacological pollution of the world's rivers showed that it threatens "environmental and/or human health in more than a quarter of the studied locations". It investigated 1052 sampling sites along 258 rivers in 104 countries, representing pollution of rivers serving 470 million people. It showed that "the most contaminated sites were in low- to middle-income countries and were associated with areas with poor wastewater and waste management infrastructure and pharmaceutical product manufacture" and listed the most frequently detected and concentrated pharmaceutical products.

- Environmental persistent pharmaceutical pollutants, which can include various pharmaceutical drugs and their metabolites (see also drug pollution), such as antidepressant drugs, antibiotics or the contraceptive pill.
- Metabolites of illicit drugs (see also wastewater epidemiology), for example methamphetamine and ecstasy.

=== Solid waste and plastics ===
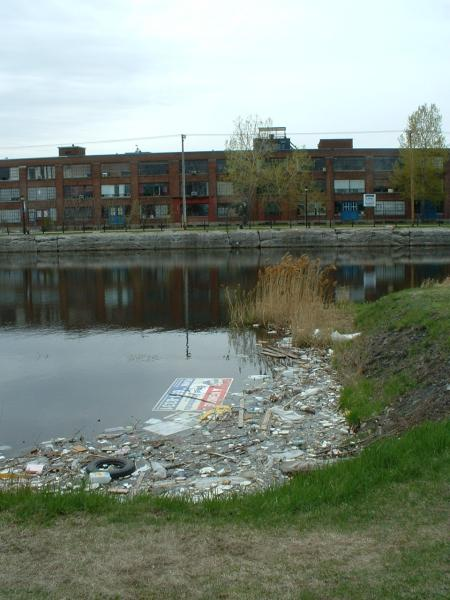
Solid waste and plastics in the Lachine Canal, Canada

Solid waste can enter water bodies through untreated sewage, combined sewer overflows, urban runoff, and people discarding garbage into the environment. Wind can also carry municipal solid waste from landfills, resulting in macroscopic pollution, where large visible items pollute the water, as well as microplastic pollution that is not directly visible. The terms marine debris and marine plastic pollution are used in the context of pollution of oceans.

Microplastics persist in the environment at high levels, particularly in aquatic and marine ecosystems, where they cause water pollution. 35% of all ocean microplastics come from textiles/clothing, primarily due to the erosion of polyester, acrylic, or nylon-based clothing, often during the washing process.

The main ways in which microplastics are transported from land to sea are via stormwater, untreated sewage and wind. The most common sources of microplastics are synthetic fabrics, tyres, and urban dust. These three sources together account for over 80% of all microplastic contamination.

== Types of surface water pollution ==
Surface water pollution includes pollution of rivers, lakes and oceans. A subset of surface water pollution is marine pollution which affects the oceans. Nutrient pollution refers to contamination by excessive inputs of nutrients.

As of 2017, an estimated 4.5 billion people globally did not have access to safely managed sanitation, according to the Joint Monitoring Programme for Water Supply and Sanitation. Lack of access to sanitation is a serious issue which often leads to water pollution. For example, open defecation can result in human feces being moved from the ground into surface waters during rain events or floods. Simple pit latrines may also flood during heavy rainfall.

As of 2022, Europe and Central Asia account for around 16% of the global discharge of microplastics into the seas. Although the management of plastic waste and its recycling is improving globally, the absolute amount of plastic pollution continues to increase unabated due to the large quantity of plastic in circulation. Even if sea plastic pollution were to stop entirely, microplastic contamination of the surface ocean would be projected to continue to increase.

=== Marine pollution ===
Marine pollution occurs when substances used or spread by humans, such as industrial, agricultural, and residential waste; particles; noise or light; excess carbon dioxide; or invasive organisms enter the ocean and cause harmful effects there. The majority of this waste (80%) comes from land-based activity, although marine transportation significantly contributes as well. It is a combination of chemicals and trash, most of which comes from land sources and is washed or blown into the ocean. This pollution results in damage to the environment, to the health of all organisms, and to economic structures worldwide. Since most inputs come from land, via rivers, sewage, or the atmosphere, it means that continental shelves are more vulnerable to pollution. Air pollution is also a contributing factor, as it carries iron, carbonic acid, nitrogen, silicon, sulfur, pesticides, and dust particles into the ocean. The pollution often comes from nonpoint sources such as agricultural runoff, wind-blown debris, and dust. These nonpoint sources are largely due to runoff that enters the ocean through rivers, but wind-blown debris and dust can also play a role, as these pollutants can settle into waterways and oceans. Pathways of pollution include direct discharge, land runoff, ship pollution, bilge pollution, dredging (which can create dredge plumes), atmospheric pollution and, potentially, deep sea mining.

=== Nutrient pollution ===
Nutrient pollution is a form of water pollution caused by too many nutrients entering the water. It is a primary cause of eutrophication of surface waters (lakes, rivers and coastal waters), in which excess nutrients, usually nitrogen or phosphorus, stimulate algal growth. Sources of nutrient pollution include surface runoff from farms, waste from septic tanks, feedlots, and emissions from burning fuels. Raw sewage, which is rich in nutrients, is also a contributing factor when dumped in water bodies. Excess nitrogen causes environmental problems such as harmful algal blooms, hypoxia, acid rain, nitrogen saturation in forests, and climate change.

=== Thermal pollution ===
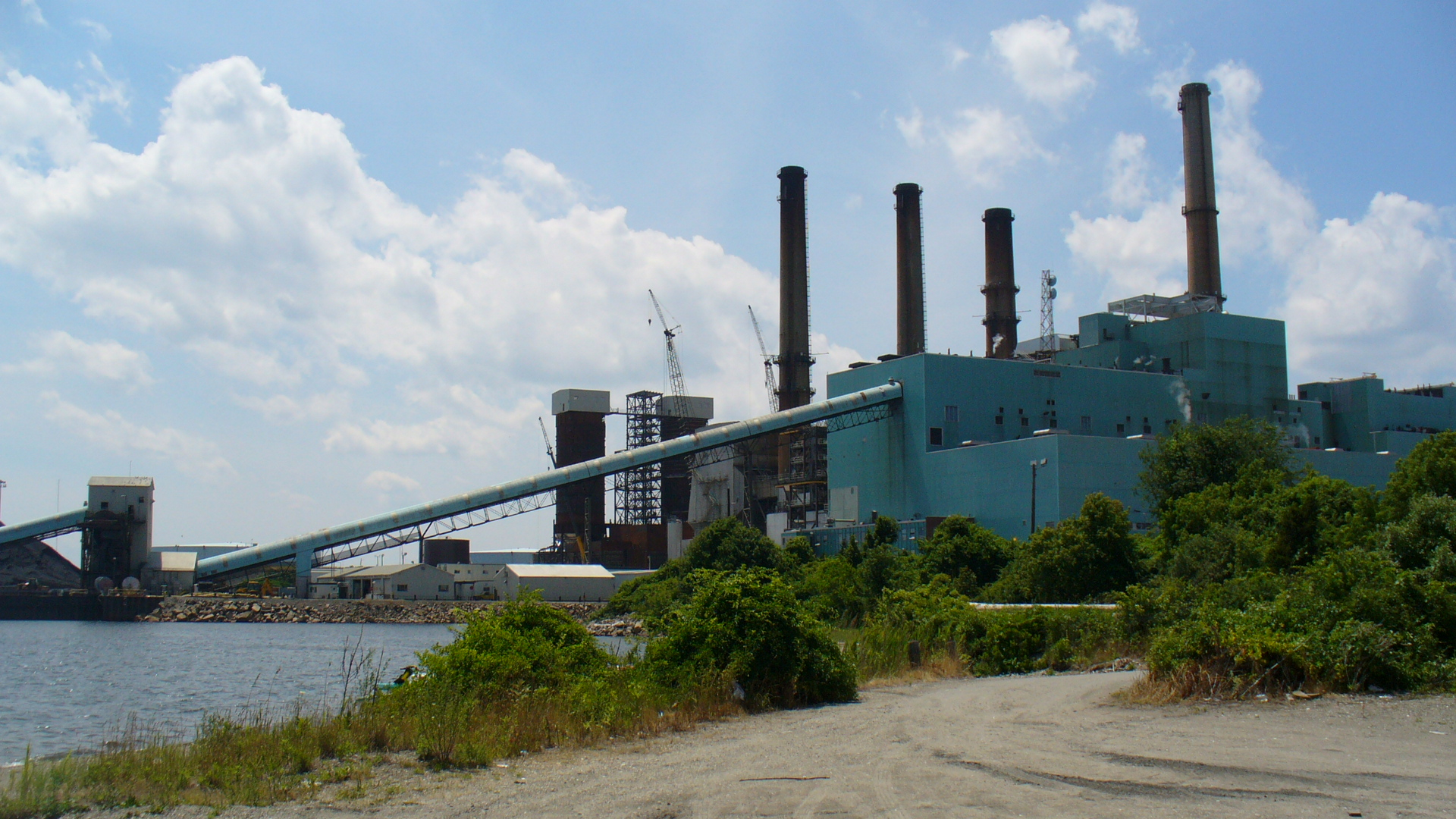
The Brayton Point Power Station in Massachusetts discharged heated water to Mount Hope Bay until 2011.

Thermal pollution, sometimes called "thermal enrichment", is the degradation of water quality by any process that changes ambient water temperature. Thermal pollution is the rise or drop in the temperature of a natural body of water caused by human influence. Thermal pollution, unlike chemical pollution, results in a change in the physical properties of water. A common cause of thermal pollution is the use of water as a coolant by power plants and industrial manufacturers. Urban runoff—stormwater discharged to surface waters from rooftops, roads, and parking lots—and reservoirs can also be a source of thermal pollution. Thermal pollution can also be caused by the release of very cold water from the base of reservoirs into warmer rivers.

Increased water temperatures decrease oxygen levels due to lower levels of dissolved oxygen, as gases are less soluble in warmer liquids. This can kill fish, which may then rot, and alter the composition of the food chain, reducing species biodiversity and fostering the invasion of new thermophilic species.

=== Biological pollution ===
The introduction of aquatic invasive organisms is also a form of water pollution, i.e., biological pollution.

== Groundwater pollution ==
Groundwater pollution (also called groundwater contamination) occurs when pollutants are released to the ground and make their way into groundwater. This type of water pollution can also occur naturally due to the presence of a minor and unwanted constituent, contaminant, or impurity in the groundwater, in which case it is more likely referred to as contamination rather than pollution. Groundwater pollution can occur from on-site sanitation systems, landfill leachate, effluent from wastewater treatment plants, leaking sewers, petrol filling stations, hydraulic fracturing (fracking), or from over application of fertilizers in agriculture. Pollution (or contamination) can also occur from naturally occurring contaminants, such as arsenic or fluoride. Using polluted groundwater causes hazards to public health through poisoning or the spread of disease (water-borne diseases).

In many parts of the world, groundwater pollution endangers the well-being of people and ecosystems. One quarter of the world's population relies on groundwater for drinking water, yet concentrated recharge is known to carry short-lived contaminants into carbonate aquifers, endangering the purity of these waters.

== Pollution from point sources ==
Point source water pollution refers to contaminants entering a waterway from a single, identifiable source, such as a pipe or ditch. Examples of sources in this category include discharges from sewage treatment plants, factories, and city storm drains.

The U.S. Clean Water Act (CWA) defines point source for regulatory enforcement purposes (see United States regulation of point source water pollution). The CWA definition of point source was amended in 1987 to include municipal storm sewer systems, as well as industrial storm water, such as from construction sites.

=== Sewage ===
Sewage typically consists of 99.9% water and 0.1% solids. Sewage contributes many classes of nutrients that lead to Eutrophication. It is a major source of phosphate for example. Sewage is often contaminated with diverse compounds found in personal hygiene, cosmetics, pharmaceutical drugs (see also drug pollution), and their metabolites Water pollution caused by persistent pharmaceutical pollutants in the environment can have wide-ranging consequences. For example, when sewers overflow during storm events, this can lead to water pollution from untreated sewage. Such events are known as sanitary sewer overflows or combined sewer overflows.

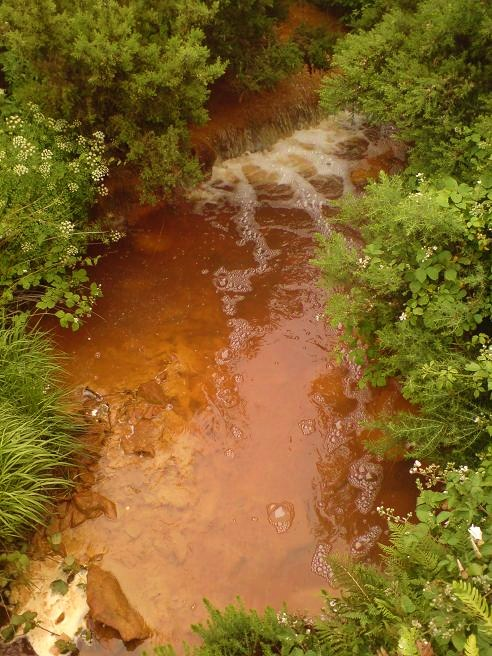
A polluted river draining an abandoned copper mine on Anglesey

=== Industrial wastewater ===
Perfluorooctanesulfonic acid (PFOS) is a global pollutant that has been found in drinking water. It appears not to biodegrade.

Industrial processes that use water also produce wastewater. This is known as industrial wastewater. In the US, for instance, power plants, petroleum refineries, iron and steel mills, pulp and paper mills, and food processing industries are the main industrial consumers of water, using over 60% of the total. Some industries discharge chemical wastes, including toxic solvents and heavy metals, as well as other harmful pollutants.

Industrial wastewater could add the following pollutants to receiving water bodies if the wastewater is not treated and managed properly:

- Heavy metals, including mercury, lead, and chromium
- Organic matter and nutrients such as food waste: Certain industries (e.g. food processing, slaughterhouse waste, paper fibers, plant material, etc.) discharge high concentrations of BOD, ammonia nitrogen and oil and grease.
- Inorganic particles such as sand, grit, metal particles, rubber residues from tires, ceramics, etc.;
- Toxins such as pesticides, poisons, herbicides, etc.
- Pharmaceuticals, endocrine disrupting compounds, hormones, perfluorinated compounds, siloxanes, drugs of abuse and other hazardous substances
- Microplastics such as polyethylene and polypropylene beads, polyester and polyamide
- Thermal pollution from power stations and industrial manufacturers
- Radionuclides from uranium mining, processing nuclear fuel, operating nuclear reactors, or disposal of radioactive waste.
- Some industrial discharges include persistent organic pollutants such as per- and polyfluoroalkyl substances (PFAS).

=== Oil spills ===
An oil spill is the release of a liquid petroleum hydrocarbon into the environment, especially the marine ecosystem, due to human activity, and is a form of pollution. The term usually refers to marine oil spills, where oil is released into the ocean or coastal waters, but spills may also occur on land. Oil spills can result from the release of crude oil from tankers, offshore platforms, drilling rigs, and wells. They may also involve spills of refined petroleum products, such as gasoline and diesel fuel, as well as their by-products. Additionally, heavier fuels used by large ships, such as bunker fuel, or spills of any oily refuse or waste oil, contribute to such incidents. These spills can have severe environmental and economic consequences.

== Pollution from nonpoint sources ==
Nonpoint source (NPS) pollution refers to diffuse contamination (or pollution) of water or air that does not originate from a single discrete source. This type of pollution is often the cumulative effect of small amounts of contaminants gathered from a large area. It is in contrast to point source pollution which results from a single source. Nonpoint source pollution generally results from land runoff, precipitation, atmospheric deposition, drainage, seepage, or hydrological modification (rainfall and snowmelt) where tracing pollution back to a single source is difficult. Nonpoint source water pollution affects a water body from sources such as polluted runoff from agricultural areas draining into a river, or wind-borne debris blowing out to sea. Nonpoint source air pollution affects air quality, from sources such as smokestacks or car tailpipes. Although these pollutants have originated from a point source, the long-range transport ability and multiple sources of the pollutant make it a nonpoint source of pollution; if the discharges were to occur to a body of water or into the atmosphere at a single location, the pollution would be single-point.

=== Agriculture ===
Agriculture is a major contributor to water pollution from nonpoint sources. The use of fertilizers as well as surface runoff from farm fields, pastures and feedlots leads to nutrient pollution. In addition to plant-focused agriculture, fish-farming is also a source of pollution. Additionally, agricultural runoff often contains high levels of pesticides.

=== Atmospheric contributions (air pollution) ===
Air deposition is the process by which air pollutants from industrial or natural sources settle in water bodies. This can result in polluted water near the source or up to a few thousand miles away. The most frequently observed water pollutants resulting from industrial air deposition are sulphur compounds, nitrogen compounds, mercury compounds, other heavy metals, and certain pesticides and industrial by-products. Natural sources of air deposition include forest fires and microbial activity.

Acid rain is caused by the emission of sulfur dioxide and nitrogen oxide, which react with the water molecules in the atmosphere to produce acids. Some governments have made efforts since the 1970s to reduce the release of sulfur dioxide and nitrogen oxide into the atmosphere. The main sources of sulfur and nitrogen compounds that result in acid rain are anthropogenic, but nitrogen oxides can also be produced naturally by lightning strikes and sulphur dioxide is produced by volcanic eruptions. Acid rain can have harmful effects on plants, aquatic ecosystems and infrastructure.

Carbon dioxide concentrations in the atmosphere have increased since the 1850s due anthropogenic influences (emissions of greenhouse gases). This leads to ocean acidification and is another form of water pollution from atmospheric contributions.

== Sampling, measurements, analysis ==
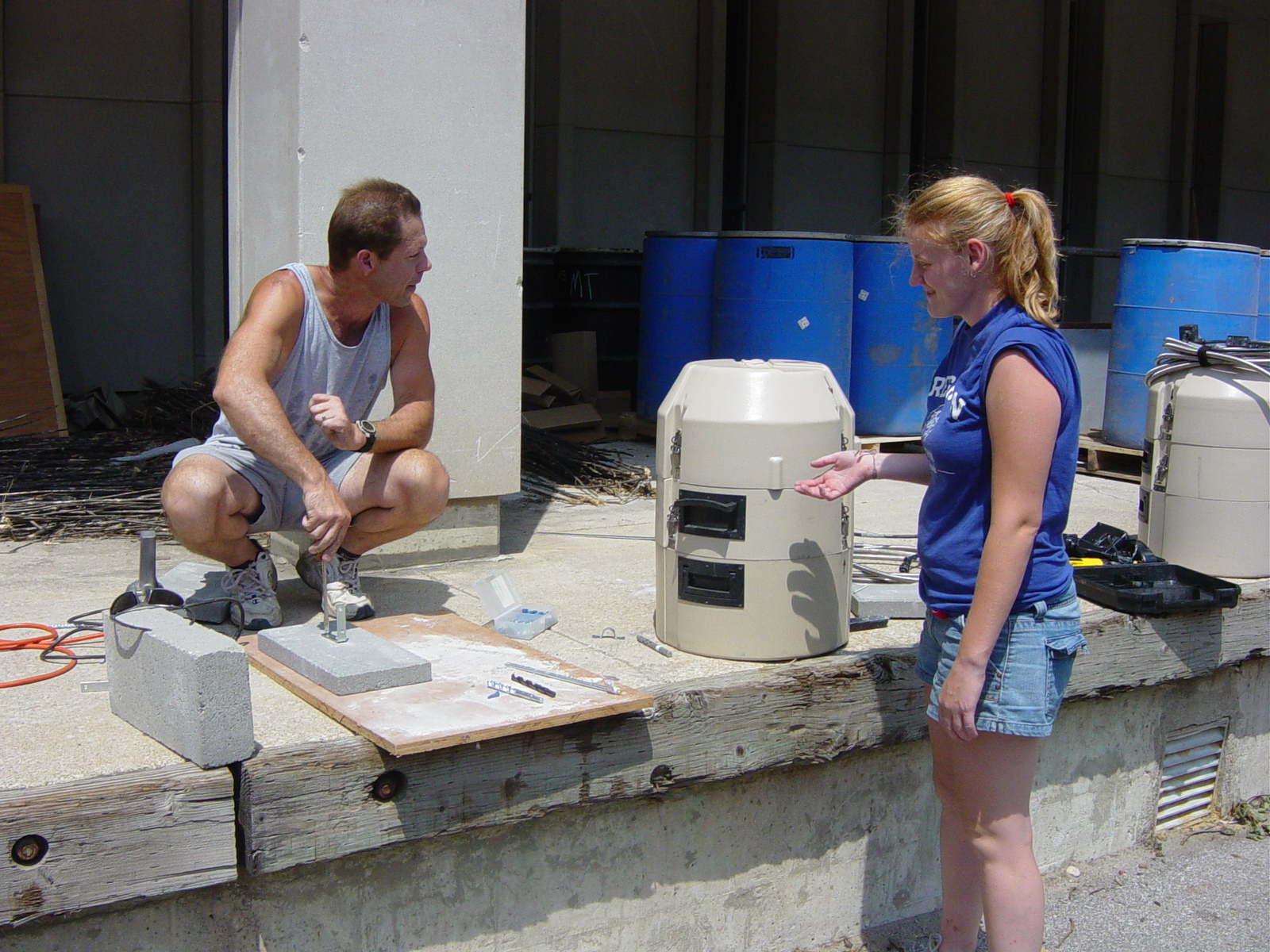
Environmental scientists preparing water autosamplers

Water pollution may be analysed through several broad categories of methods: physical, chemical and biological. Some methods may be conducted in situ, without sampling, such as temperature. Others involve collection of samples, followed by specialized analytical tests in the laboratory. Standardized, validated analytical test methods, for water and wastewater samples have been published.

Common physical tests of water include temperature, Specific conductance or electrical conductance (EC) or conductivity, solids concentrations (e.g., total suspended solids (TSS)) and turbidity. Water samples may be examined using analytical chemistry methods. Many published test methods are available for both organic and inorganic compounds. Frequently used parameters that are quantified are pH, BOD, chemical oxygen demand (COD), dissolved oxygen (DO), total hardness, nutrients (nitrogen and phosphorus compounds, e.g. nitrate and orthophosphates), metals (including copper, zinc, cadmium, lead and mercury), oil and grease, total petroleum hydrocarbons (TPH), surfactants and pesticides.

The use of a biomonitor or bioindicator is described as biological monitoring. This refers to the measurement of specific properties of an organism to obtain information on the surrounding physical and chemical environment. Biological testing involves the use of plant, animal or microbial indicators to monitor the health of an aquatic ecosystem. They are any biological species or group of species whose function, population, or status can reveal what degree of ecosystem or environmental integrity is present. One example of a group of bio-indicators are the copepods and other small water crustaceans that are present in many water bodies. Such organisms can be monitored for changes (biochemical, physiological, or behavioral) that may indicate a problem within their ecosystem.

The complexity of water quality as a subject is reflected in the many types of measurements of water quality indicators. Some measurements of water quality are most accurately made on-site, because water exists in equilibrium with its surroundings. Measurements commonly made on-site and in direct contact with the water source in question include temperature, pH, dissolved oxygen, conductivity, oxygen reduction potential (ORP), turbidity, and Secchi disk depth.

== Impacts ==
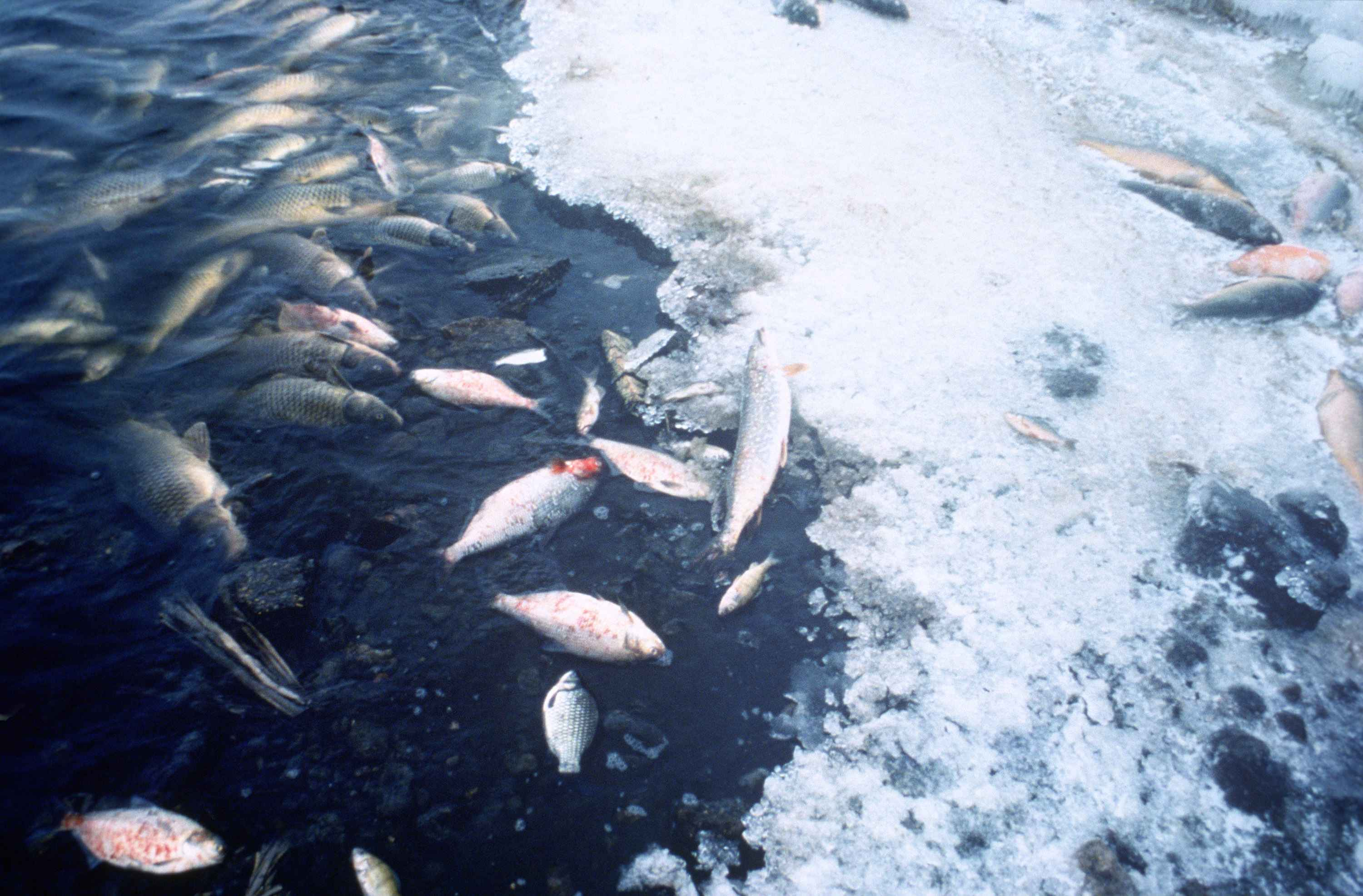
Oxygen depletion, resulting from nitrogen pollution and eutrophication, is a common cause of fish kills.

=== Ecosystems ===
Water pollution is a major global environmental problem because it can degrade all aquatic ecosystems, including freshwater, coastal, and ocean waters. The specific contaminants that lead to water pollution include a wide range of chemicals, pathogens, and physical changes such as elevated temperature. While many of the chemicals and substances that are regulated may be naturally occurring (calcium, sodium, iron, manganese, etc.) the concentration usually determines what is a natural component of water and what is a contaminant. High concentrations of naturally occurring substances can have negative impacts on aquatic flora and fauna. Oxygen-depleting substances may be natural materials such as plant matter (e.g. leaves and grass) as well as human-made chemicals. Other natural and anthropogenic substances may cause turbidity (cloudiness) which blocks light and disrupts plant growth, and clogs the gills of some fish species.

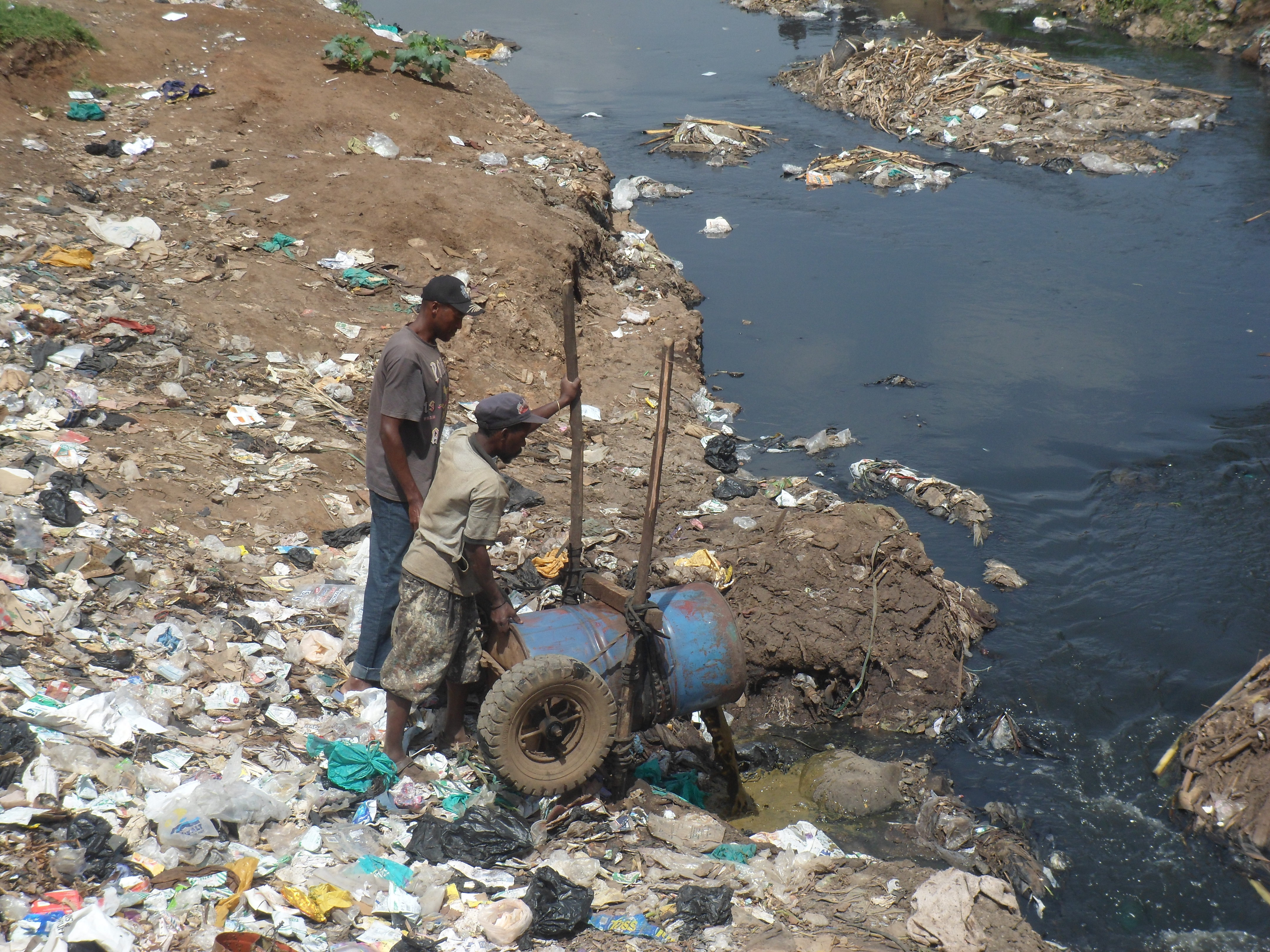
Fecal sludge collected from pit latrines is dumped into a river at the Korogocho slum in Nairobi, Kenya

=== Public health and waterborne diseases ===
Number of deaths from diarrheal diseases by risk factor for under 5s

A study published in 2017 stated that "polluted water spread gastrointestinal diseases and parasitic infections and killed 1.8 million people" (these are also referred to as waterborne diseases). Persistent exposure to pollutants through water are environmental health hazards, which can increase the likelihood for one to develop cancer or other diseases.

=== Eutrophication from nitrogen pollution ===
Nitrogen pollution can cause eutrophication, especially in lakes. Eutrophication is an increase in the concentration of chemical nutrients in an ecosystem to an extent that increases the primary productivity of the ecosystem. Subsequent negative environmental effects such as anoxia (oxygen depletion) and severe reductions in water quality may occur. This can harm fish and other animal populations.

Eutrophication is a general term describing a process in which nutrients accumulate in a body of water, resulting in an increased growth of organisms that may deplete the oxygen in the water; i.e. the process of too many plants growing on the surface of a river, lake, etc., often because chemicals that are used to help crops grow have been carried there by rain. Eutrophication may occur naturally or as a result of human actions. Manmade, or cultural, eutrophication occurs when sewage, industrial wastewater, fertilizer runoff, and other nutrient sources are released into the environment. Such nutrient pollution usually causes algal blooms and bacterial growth, resulting in the depletion of dissolved oxygen in water and causing substantial environmental degradation. Many policies have been introduced to combat eutrophication, including the United Nations Development Program (UNDP)'s sustainability development goals.

=== Ocean acidification ===
Ocean acidification is another impact of water pollution. Ocean acidification is the ongoing decrease in the pH value of the Earth's oceans, caused by the uptake of carbon dioxide (CO_{2}) from the atmosphere.

== Prevalence ==
Water pollution is a problem in developing countries as well as in developed countries.

=== By country ===
For example, water pollution in India and China is widespread. About 90 percent of the water in the cities of China is polluted.

== Control and reduction ==
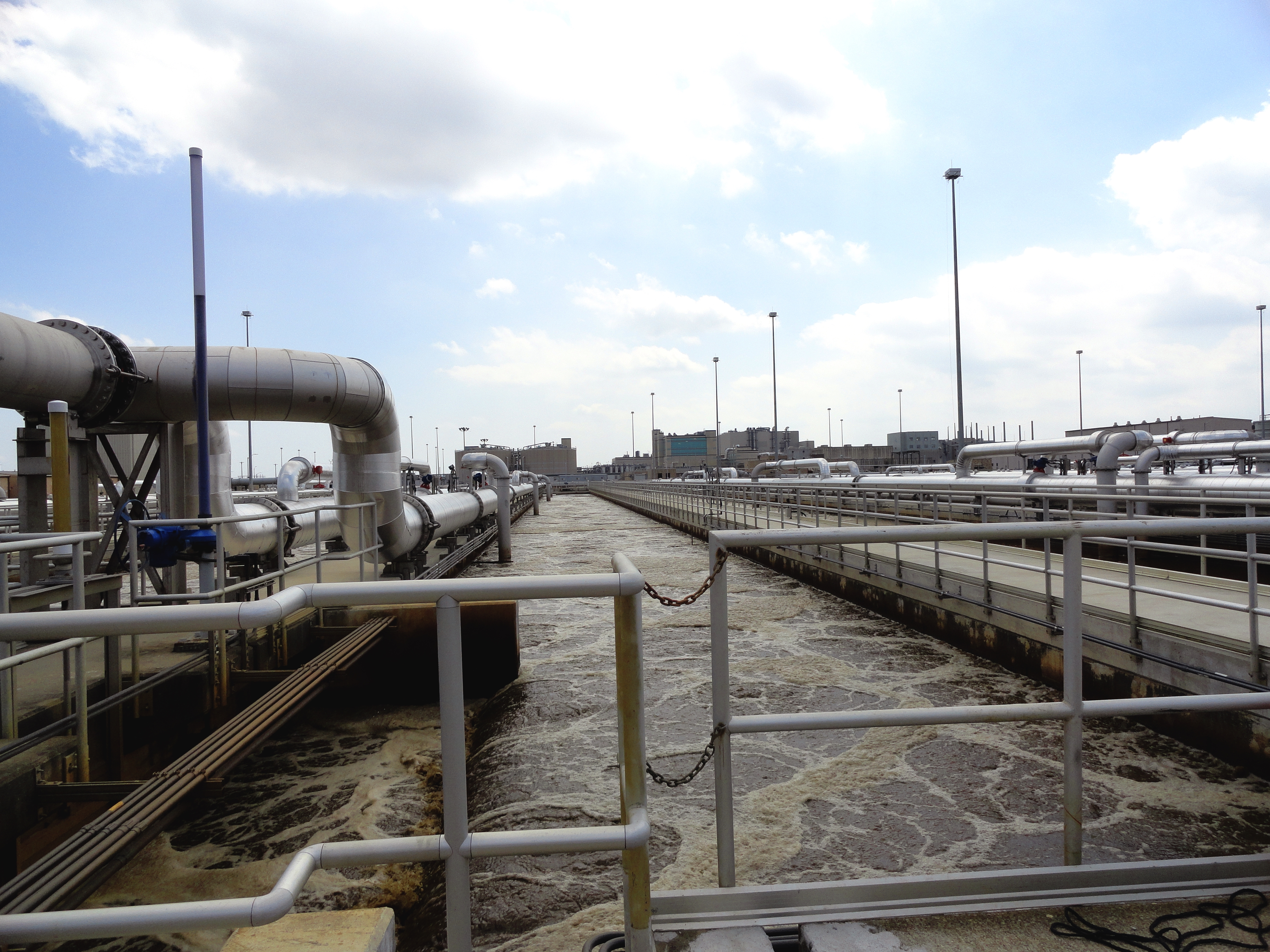
View of secondary treatment reactors (activated sludge process) at the Blue Plains Advanced Wastewater Treatment Plant, Washington, D.C., United States. Seen in the distance are the sludge digester building and thermal hydrolysis reactors.

=== Pollution control philosophy ===
Mandatory regulations are one aspect of environmental protection, but they are only part of the solution. Other important tools for controlling pollution include environmental education, economic instruments, market forces and stricter enforcement. Standards can be "precise" (for a defined quantifiable minimum or maximum value for a pollutant), or "imprecise" which would require the use of Best available technology (BAT) or Best practicable environmental option (BPEO). Market-based economic instruments for pollution control can include charges, subsidies, deposit or refund schemes, the creation of a market in pollution credits, and enforcement incentives.

Moving towards a holistic approach in chemical pollution control combines the following approaches: Integrated control measures, trans-boundary considerations, complementary and supplementary control measures, life-cycle considerations, the impacts of chemical mixtures.

Control of water pollution requires appropriate infrastructure and management plans. The infrastructure may include wastewater treatment plants, for example sewage treatment plants and industrial wastewater treatment plants. Agricultural wastewater treatment for farms, and erosion control at construction sites can also help prevent water pollution. Effective control of urban runoff includes reducing speed and quantity of flow.

Water pollution requires ongoing evaluation and revision of water resource policy at all levels (international down to individual aquifers and wells).

=== Sanitation and sewage treatment ===
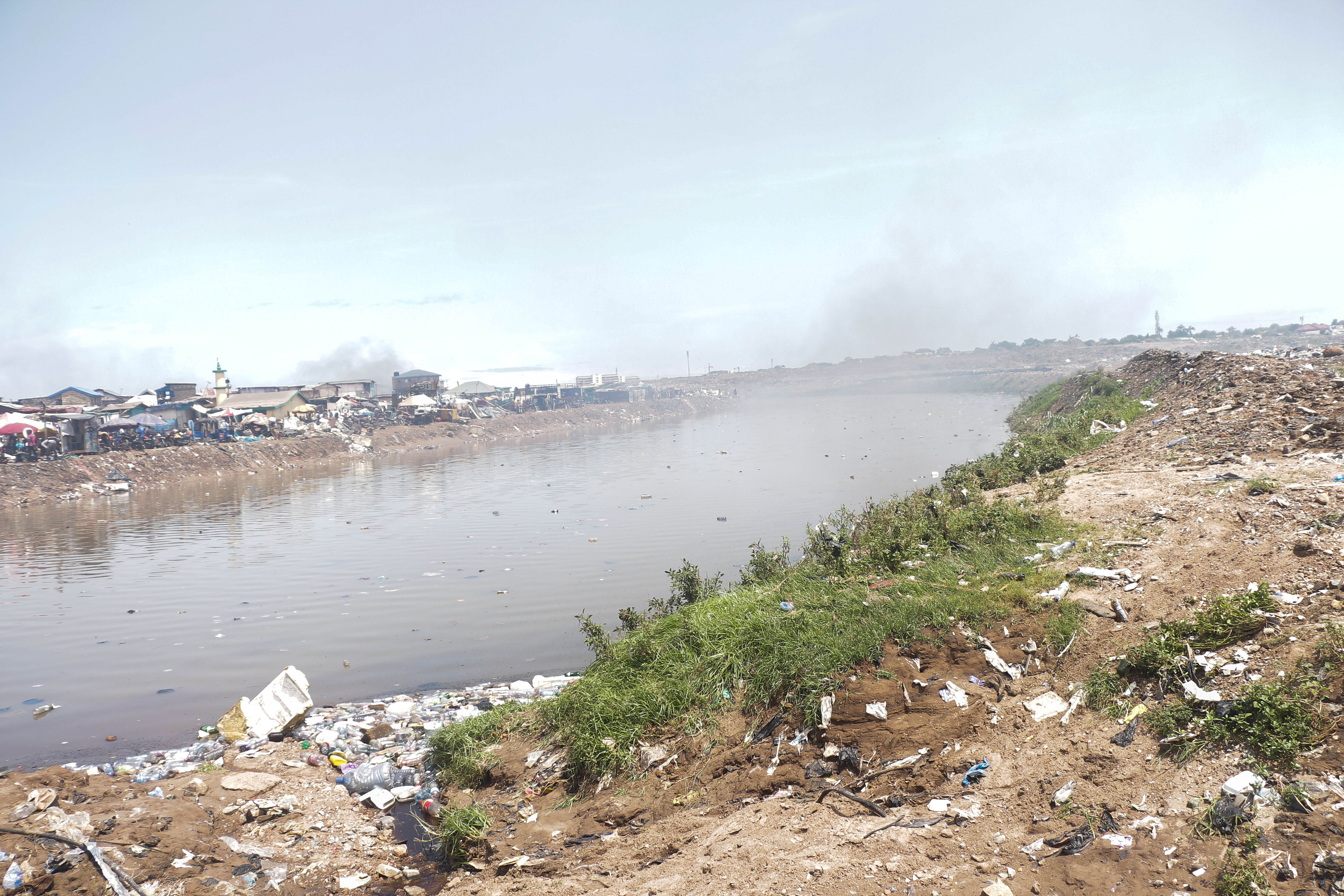
Plastic waste on the big drainage, and air pollution in the far end of the drainage in Ghana

Municipal wastewater can be treated by centralized sewage treatment plants, decentralized wastewater systems, nature-based solutions or in onsite sewage facilities and septic tanks. For example, waste stabilization ponds can be a low cost treatment option for sewage. UV light (sunlight) can be used to degrade some pollutants in waste stabilization ponds (sewage lagoons). The use of safely managed sanitation services would prevent water pollution caused by lack of access to sanitation.

Well-designed and operated systems (i.e., with secondary treatment stages or more advanced tertiary treatment) can remove 90 percent or more of the pollutant load in sewage. Some plants have additional systems to remove nutrients and pathogens. While such advanced treatment techniques will undoubtedly reduce the discharges of micropollutants, they can also result in large financial costs, as well as environmentally undesirable increases in energy consumption and greenhouse gas emissions.

Sewer overflows during storm events can be addressed by timely maintenance and upgrades of the sewerage system. In the US, cities with large combined systems have not pursued system-wide separation projects due to the high cost, but have implemented partial separation projects and green infrastructure approaches. In some cases municipalities have installed additional CSO storage facilities or expanded sewage treatment capacity.

=== Industrial wastewater treatment ===
Industrial wastewater treatment describes the processes used for treating wastewater that is produced by industries as an undesirable by-product. After treatment, the treated industrial wastewater (or effluent) may be reused or released to a sanitary sewer or to a surface water in the environment. Some industrial facilities generate wastewater that can be treated in sewage treatment plants. Most industrial processes, such as petroleum refineries, chemical and petrochemical plants have their own specialized facilities to treat their wastewaters so that the pollutant concentrations in the treated wastewater comply with the regulations regarding disposal of wastewaters into sewers or into rivers, lakes or oceans. This applies to industries that generate wastewater with high concentrations of organic matter (e.g. oil and grease), toxic pollutants (e.g. heavy metals, volatile organic compounds) or nutrients such as ammonia. Some industries install a pre-treatment system to remove some pollutants (e.g., toxic compounds), and then discharge the partially treated wastewater to the municipal sewer system.

=== Agricultural wastewater treatment ===
Agricultural wastewater treatment is a farm management agenda for controlling pollution from confined animal operations and from surface runoff that may be contaminated by chemicals or organisms in fertilizer, pesticides, animal slurry, crop residues or irrigation water. Agricultural wastewater treatment is required for continuous confined animal operations like milk and egg production. It may be performed in plants using mechanized treatment units similar to those used for industrial wastewater. Where land is available for ponds, settling basins and facultative lagoons may have lower operational costs for seasonal use conditions from breeding or harvest cycles. Animal slurries are usually treated by containment in anaerobic lagoons before disposal by spray or trickle application to grassland. Constructed wetlands are sometimes used to facilitate treatment of animal wastes.

=== Management of erosion and sediment control ===
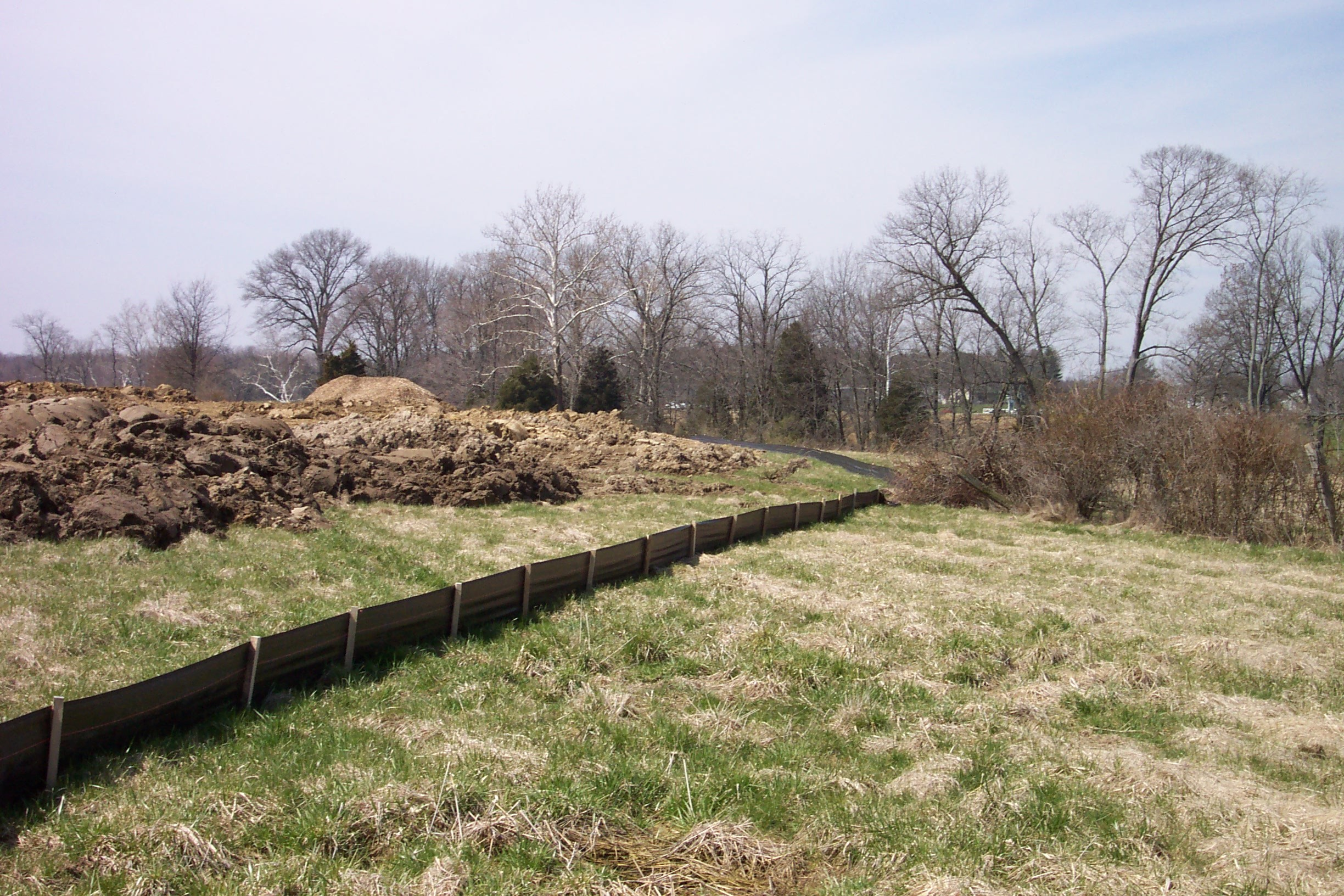
Silt fence installed on a construction site

Sediment from construction sites can be managed by installation of erosion controls, such as mulching and hydroseeding, and sediment controls, such as sediment basins and silt fences. Discharge of toxic chemicals such as motor fuels and concrete washout can be prevented by use of spill prevention and control plans, and specially designed containers (e.g. for concrete washout) and structures such as overflow controls and diversion berms.

Erosion caused by deforestation and changes in hydrology (soil loss due to water runoff) also results in loss of sediment and, potentially, water pollution.

=== Control of urban runoff (storm water) ===
Effective control of urban runoff involves reducing the velocity and flow of stormwater, as well as reducing pollutant discharges. Local governments use a variety of stormwater management techniques to reduce the effects of urban runoff. These techniques, called best management practices for water pollution (BMPs) in some countries, may focus on water quantity control, while others focus on improving water quality, and some perform both functions.

Pollution prevention practices include low impact development (LID) or green infrastructure techniques - known as Sustainable Drainage Systems (SuDS) in the UK, and Water-Sensitive Urban Design (WSUD) in Australia and the Middle East - such as the installation of green roofs and improved chemical handling (e.g. management of motor fuels & oil, fertilizers, pesticides and roadway deicers). Runoff mitigation systems include infiltration basins, bioretention systems, constructed wetlands, retention basins, and similar devices.

Share of water bodies with good water quality in 2020. A water body is classified as "good" quality if at least 80% of monitoring values meet target quality levels, see also SDG 6, Indicator 6.3.2.

=== Legislation ===
==== Philippines ====
In the Philippines, Republic Act 9275, otherwise known as the Philippine Clean Water Act of 2004, is the governing law on wastewater management. It states that it is the country's policy to protect, preserve and revive the quality of its fresh, brackish and marine waters, for which wastewater management plays a particular role.

==== United Kingdom ====
In 2024, The Royal Academy of Engineering released a study into the effects wastewater on public health in the United Kingdom. The study gained media attention, with comments from the UKs leading health professionals, including Sir Chris Whitty. Outlining 15 recommendations for various UK bodies to dramatically reduce public health risks by increasing the water quality in its waterways, such as rivers and lakes.

After the release of the report, The Guardian newspaper interviewed Whitty, who stated that improving water quality and sewage treatment should be a high level of importance and a "public health priority". He compared it to eradicating cholera in the 19th century in the country following improvements to the sewage treatment network. The study also identified that low water flows in rivers saw high concentration levels of sewage, as well as times of flooding or heavy rainfall. While heavy rainfall had always been associated with sewage overflows into streams and rivers, the British media went as far to warn parents of the dangers of paddling in shallow rivers during warm weather.

Whitty's comments came after the study revealed that the UK was experiencing a growth in the number of people that were using coastal and inland waters recreationally. This could be connected to a growing interest in activities such as open water swimming or other water sports. Despite this growth in recreation, poor water quality meant some were becoming unwell during events. Most notably, the 2024 Paris Olympics had to delay numerous swimming-focused events like the triathlon due to high levels of sewage in the River Seine.

==== United States ====
The Clean Water Act is the primary federal law in the United States governing water pollution in surface waters. The 1972 CWA amendments established a broad regulatory framework for improving water quality. The law defines procedures for pollution control and developing criteria and standards for pollutants in surface water. The law authorizes the Environmental Protection Agency to regulate surface water pollution in the United States, in partnership with state agencies. Prior to 1972 it was legal to discharge wastewater to surface waters without testing for or removing water pollutants. The CWA was amended in 1981 and 1987 to adjust the federal proportion of construction grant funding for local governments, regulate municipal storm sewer discharges and to later establish the Clean Water State Revolving Fund. The fund provides low-interest loans to improve municipal sewage treatment systems and finance other water quality improvements.

== See also ==
- Aquatic toxicology
- Environmental impact of pesticides § Water
- Human impacts on the environment
- Phytoremediation
- Pollution
- Trophic state index (water quality indicator for lakes)
- VOC contamination of groundwater
- Water resources management
- Water security
