= Nonpoint source pollution =

Pollution resulting from multiple sources

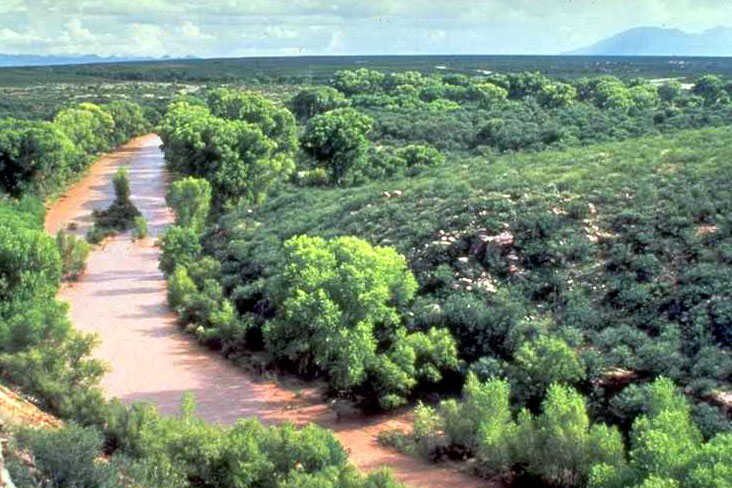
Muddy river polluted by sediment

Nonpoint source (NPS) pollution refers to diffuse contamination (or pollution) of water or air that does not originate from a single discrete source. This type of pollution is often the cumulative effect of small amounts of contaminants gathered from a large area. It is in contrast to point source pollution which results from a single source. Nonpoint source pollution generally results from land runoff, precipitation, atmospheric deposition, drainage, seepage, or hydrological modification (rainfall and snowmelt) where tracing pollution back to a single source is difficult. Nonpoint source water pollution affects a water body from sources such as polluted runoff from agricultural areas draining into a river, or wind-borne debris blowing out to sea. Nonpoint source air pollution affects air quality, from sources such as smokestacks or car tailpipes. Although these pollutants have originated from a point source, the long-range transport ability and multiple sources of the pollutant make it a nonpoint source of pollution; if the discharges were to occur to a body of water or into the atmosphere at a single location, the pollution would be single-point.

Nonpoint source water pollution may derive from many different sources with no specific solutions or changes to rectify the problem, making it difficult to regulate. Nonpoint source water pollution is difficult to control because it comes from the everyday activities of many different people, such as lawn fertilization, applying pesticides, road construction or building construction. Controlling nonpoint source pollution requires improving the management of urban and suburban areas, agricultural operations, forestry operations and marinas.

Types of nonpoint source water pollution include sediment, nutrients, toxic contaminants and chemicals and pathogens. Principal sources of nonpoint source water pollution include: urban and suburban areas, agricultural operations, atmospheric inputs, highway runoff, forestry and mining operations, marinas and boating activities. In urban areas, contaminated storm water washed off of parking lots, roads and highways, called urban runoff, is usually included under the category of non-point sources (it can become a point source if it is channeled into storm drain systems and discharged through pipes to local surface waters). In agriculture, the leaching out of nitrogen compounds from fertilized agricultural lands is a nonpoint source water pollution. Nutrient runoff in storm water from "sheet flow" over an agricultural field or a forest are also examples of non-point source pollution.

== Principal types (for water pollution) ==
=== Sediment ===
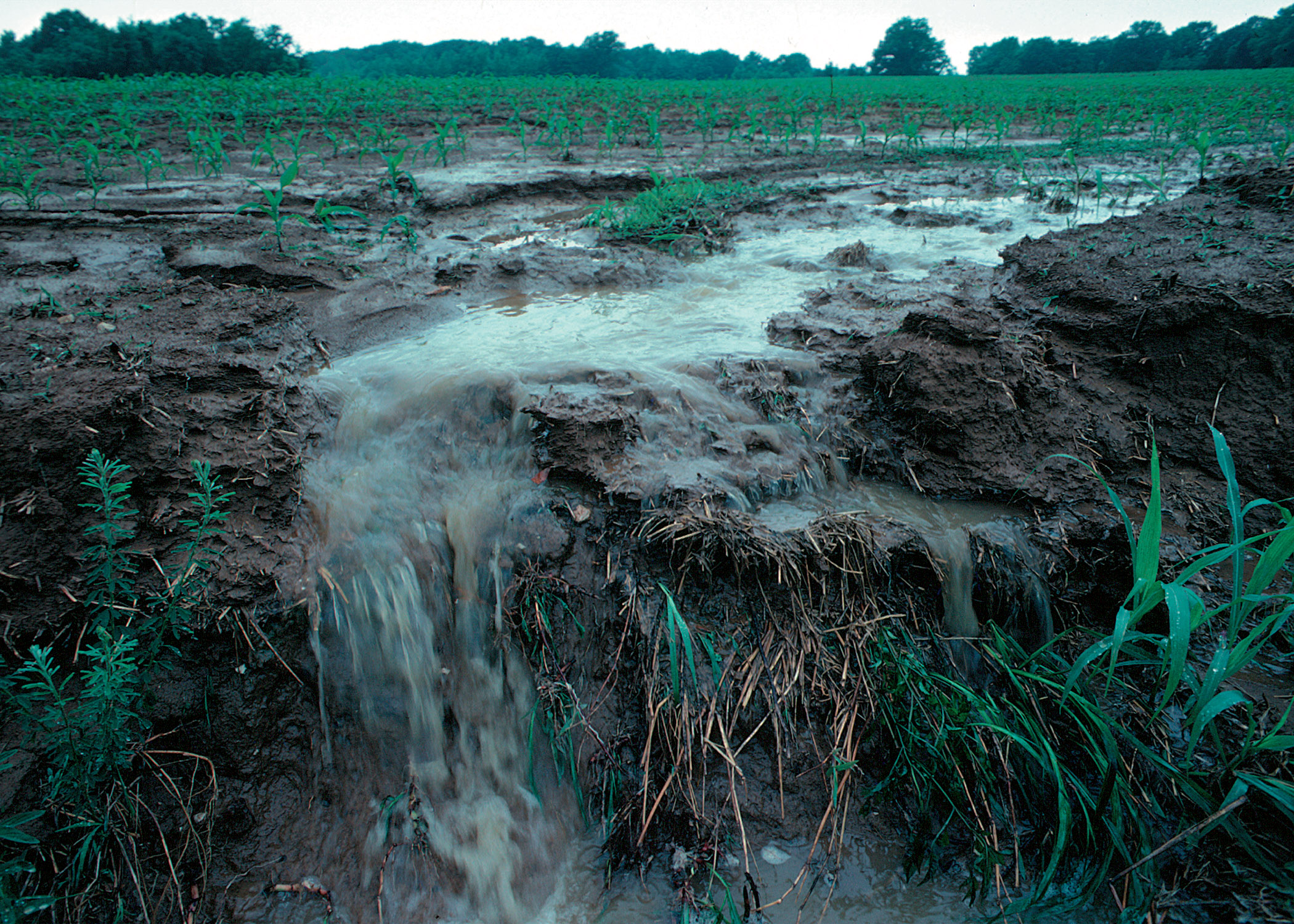
Runoff of soil and fertilizer during a rain storm

Characteristics of point and nonpoint sources of chemical inputs (modified from Novonty and Olem 1994)
Point sources
- Wastewater effluent (municipal and industrial)
- Runoff and leachate from waste disposal systems
- Runoff and infiltration from animal feedlots
- Runoff from mines, oil fields, unsewered industrial sites
- Overflows of combined storm and sanitary sewers
- Runoff from construction sites less than 20,000 m^{2} (220,000 ft²)
- Untreated sewage

Nonpoint sources

- Runoff from agriculture due to fertilizers and pesticides /irrigation
- Runoff from pasture and range
- Urban runoff from unsewered areas
- Septic tank leachate
- Runoff from construction sites >20,000 m^{2} (220,000 ft²)
- Runoff from abandoned mines
- Atmospheric deposition over a water surface
- Other land activities generating contaminants

Sediment (loose soil) includes silt (fine particles) and suspended solids (larger particles). Sediment may enter surface waters from eroding stream banks, and from surface runoff due to improper plant cover on urban and rural land. Sediment creates turbidity (cloudiness) in water bodies, reducing the amount of light reaching lower depths, which can inhibit growth of submerged aquatic plants and consequently affect species which are dependent on them, such as fish and shellfish. With an increased sediment load into a body of water, the oxygen can also be depleted or reduced to a level that is harmful to the species living in that area. High turbidity levels also inhibit drinking water purification systems. Sediments are also transported into the water column due to waves and wind. When sediments are eroded at a continuous rate, they will stay in the water column and the turbidity level will increase.

Sedimentation is a process by which sediment is transported to a body of water. The sediment will then be deposited into the water system or stay in the water column. When there are high rates of sedimentation, flooding can occur due to a build-up of too much sediment. When flooding occurs, waterfront properties can be damaged further by high amounts of sediment being present.

Sediment can also be discharged from multiple different sources. Sources include construction sites (although these are point sources, which can be managed with erosion controls and sediment controls), agricultural fields, stream banks, and highly disturbed areas.

=== Nutrients ===
Nonpoint source pollution is caused when precipitation (1) carries pollutants from the ground such as nitrogen (N) and phosphorus (P) pollutants which come from fertilizers used on farm lands (2) or urban areas (3). These nutrients can cause eutrophication (4).

Nutrients mainly refers to inorganic matter from runoff, landfills, livestock operations and crop lands. The two primary nutrients of concern are phosphorus and nitrogen.

Phosphorus is a nutrient that occurs in many forms that are bioavailable. It is notoriously over-abundant in human sewage sludge. It is a main ingredient in many fertilizers used for agriculture as well as on residential and commercial properties and may become a limiting nutrient in freshwater systems and some estuaries. Phosphorus is most often transported to water bodies via soil erosion because many forms of phosphorus tend to be adsorbed on to soil particles. Excess amounts of phosphorus in aquatic systems (particularly freshwater lakes, reservoirs, and ponds) leads to proliferation of microscopic algae called phytoplankton. The increase of organic matter supply due to the excessive growth of the phytoplankton is called eutrophication. A common symptom of eutrophication is algae blooms that can produce unsightly surface scums, shade out beneficial types of plants, produce taste-and-odor-causing compounds, and poison the water due to toxins produced by the algae. These toxins are a particular problem in systems used for drinking water because some toxins can cause human illness and removal of the toxins is difficult and expensive. Bacterial decomposition of algal blooms consumes dissolved oxygen in the water, generating hypoxia with detrimental consequences for fish and aquatic invertebrates.

Nitrogen is the other key ingredient in fertilizers, and it generally becomes a pollutant in saltwater or brackish estuarine systems where nitrogen is a limiting nutrient. Similar to phosphorus in fresh-waters, excess amounts of bioavailable nitrogen in marine systems lead to eutrophication and algae blooms. Hypoxia is an increasingly common result of eutrophication in marine systems and can impact large areas of estuaries, bays, and near shore coastal waters. Each summer, hypoxic conditions form in bottom waters where the Mississippi River enters the Gulf of Mexico. During recent summers, the aerial extent of this "dead zone" is comparable to the area of New Jersey and has major detrimental consequences for fisheries in the region.

Nitrogen is most often transported by water as nitrate (NO_{3}). The nitrogen is usually added to a watershed as organic-N or ammonia (NH_{3}), so nitrogen stays attached to the soil until oxidation converts it into nitrate. Since the nitrate is generally already incorporated into the soil, the water traveling through the soil (i.e., interflow and tile drainage) is the most likely to transport it, rather than surface runoff.

=== Toxic contaminants and chemicals ===
Toxic chemicals mainly include organic compounds and inorganic compounds. Inorganic compounds, including heavy metals like lead, mercury, zinc, and cadmium are resistant to breakdown. These contaminants can come from a variety of sources including human sewage sludge, mining operations, vehicle emissions, fossil fuel combustion, urban runoff, industrial operations and landfills.

Other toxic contaminants include organic compounds such as polychlorinated biphenyls (PCBs) and polycyclic aromatic hydrocarbons (PAHs), fire retardants, and many agrochemicals like DDT, other pesticides, and fertilizers. These compounds can have severe effects to the ecosystem and water-bodies and can threaten the health of both humans and aquatic species while being resistant to environmental breakdown, thus allowing them to persist in the environment. These compounds can also be present in the air and water environments, causing damage to the environment and risking harmful exposure to living species. These toxic chemicals could come from croplands, nurseries, orchards, building sites, gardens, lawns and landfills.

Acids and salts mainly are inorganic pollutants from irrigated lands, mining operations, urban runoff, industrial sites and landfills. Other inorganic toxic contaminants can come from foundries and other factory plants, sewage, mining, and coal-burning power stations.

=== Pathogens ===
Pathogens are bacteria and viruses that can be found in water and cause diseases in humans. Typically, pathogens cause disease when they are present in public drinking water supplies. Pathogens found in contaminated runoff may include:

- Cryptosporidium parvum
- Giardia lamblia
- Salmonella
- Norovirus and other viruses
- Parasitic worms (helminths).

Coliform bacteria and fecal matter may also be detected in runoff. These bacteria are a commonly used indicator of water pollution, but not an actual cause of disease.

Pathogens may contaminate runoff due to poorly managed livestock operations, faulty septic systems, improper handling of pet waste, the over application of human sewage sludge, contaminated storm sewers, and sanitary sewer overflows.

== Principal sources (for water pollution) ==
=== Urban and suburban areas ===
Urban and suburban areas are a main sources of nonpoint source pollution due to the amount of runoff that is produced due to the large amount of paved surfaces. Paved surfaces, such as asphalt and concrete are impervious to water penetrating them. Any water that is on contact with these surfaces will run off and be absorbed by the surrounding environment. These surfaces make it easier for stormwater to carry pollutants into the surrounding soil.

Construction sites tend to have disturbed soil that is easily eroded by precipitation like rain, snow, and hail. Additionally, discarded debris on the site can be carried away by runoff waters and enter the aquatic environment.

Contaminated stormwater washed off parking lots, roads and highways, and lawns (often containing fertilizers and pesticides) is called urban runoff. This runoff is often classified as a type of NPS pollution. Some people may also consider it a point source because many times it is channeled into municipal storm drain systems and discharged through pipes to nearby surface waters. However, not all urban runoff flows through storm drain systems before entering water bodies. Some may flow directly into water bodies, especially in developing and suburban areas. Also, unlike other types of point sources, such as industrial discharges, sewage treatment plants and other operations, pollution in urban runoff cannot be attributed to one activity or even group of activities. Therefore, because it is not caused by an easily identified and regulated activity, urban runoff pollution sources are also often treated as true nonpoint sources as municipalities work to abate them. An example of this is in Michigan, through a NPS (nonpoint source) program. This program helps stakeholders create watershed management plans to combat nonpoint source pollution.

Typically, in suburban areas, chemicals are used for lawn care. These chemicals can end up in runoff and enter the surrounding environment via storm drains in the city. Since the water in storm drains is not treated before flowing into surrounding water bodies, the chemicals enter the water directly.

Other significant sources of runoff include habitat modification and silviculture (forestry).

=== Agricultural operations ===
Nutrients (nitrogen and phosphorus) are typically applied to farmland as commercial fertilizer, animal manure, or spraying of municipal or industrial wastewater (effluent) or sludge. Nutrients may also enter runoff from crop residues, irrigation water, wildlife, and atmospheric deposition. Nutrient pollution such as nitrates can harm the aquatic environments by degrading water quality by lowering levels of oxygen, which can inturn induce algal blooms and eutrophication.

Other agrochemicals such as pesticides and fungicides can enter environments from agricultural lands through runoff and deposition as well. Pesticides such as DDT or atrazine can travel through waterways or stay suspended in air and carried by wind in a process known as "spray drift". Sediment (loose soil) washed off fields is a form of agricultural pollution. Farms with large livestock and poultry operations, such as factory farms, are often point source dischargers. These facilities are called "concentrated animal feeding operations" or "feedlots" in the US and are being subject to increasing government regulation.

Agricultural operations account for a large percentage of all nonpoint source pollution in the United States. When large tracts of land are plowed to grow crops, it exposes and loosens soil that was once buried. This makes the exposed soil more vulnerable to erosion during rainstorms. It also can increase the amount of fertilizer and pesticides carried into nearby bodies of water.

=== Atmospheric inputs ===
Atmospheric deposition is a source of inorganic and organic constituents because these constituents are transported from sources of air pollution to receptors on the ground. Typically, industrial facilities, like factories, emit air pollution via a smokestack. Although this is a point source, due to the distributional nature, long-range transport, and multiple sources of the pollution, it can be considered as nonpoint source in the depositional area. Atmospheric inputs that affect runoff quality may come from dry deposition between storm events and wet deposition during storm events. The effects of vehicular traffic on the wet and dry deposition that occurs on or near highways, roadways, and parking areas creates uncertainties in the magnitudes of various atmospheric sources in runoff. Existing networks that use protocols sufficient to quantify these concentrations and loads do not measure many of the constituents of interest and these networks are too sparse to provide good deposition estimates at a local scale

=== Highway runoff ===
Highway runoff accounts for a small but widespread percentage of all nonpoint source pollution. Harned (1988) estimated that runoff loads were composed of atmospheric fallout (9%), vehicle deposition (25%) and highway maintenance materials (67%) he also estimated that about 9 percent of these loads were reentrained in the atmosphere.

=== Forestry and mining operations ===
Forestry and mining operations can have significant inputs to nonpoint source pollution.

==== Forestry ====
Forestry operations reduce the number of trees in a given area, thus reducing the oxygen levels in that area as well. This action, coupled with the heavy machinery (harvesters, etc.) rolling over the soil increases the risk of erosion.

==== Mining ====
Active mining operations are considered point sources, however runoff from abandoned mining operations contribute to nonpoint source pollution. In strip mining operations, the top of the mountain is removed to expose the desired ore. If this area is not properly reclaimed once the mining has finished, soil erosion can occur. Additionally, there can be chemical reactions with the air and newly exposed rock to create acidic runoff. Water that seeps out of abandoned subsurface mines can also be highly acidic. This can seep into the nearest body of water and change the pH in the aquatic environment.

=== Marinas and boating activities ===
Chemicals used for boat maintenance, like paint, solvents, and oils find their way into water through runoff. Additionally, spilling fuels or leaking fuels directly into the water from boats contribute to nonpoint source pollution. Nutrient and bacteria levels are increased by poorly maintained sanitary waste receptacles on the boat and pump-out stations.

== Control (for water pollution) ==
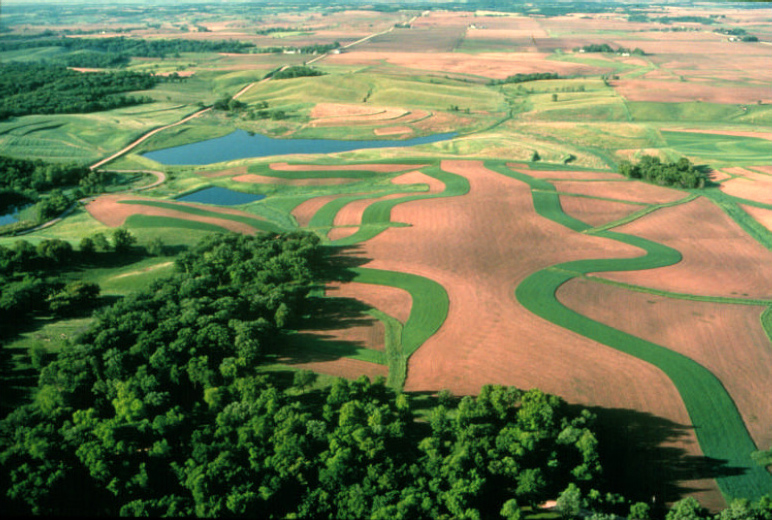
Contour buffer strips used to retain soil and reduce erosion

=== Urban and suburban areas ===
To control nonpoint source pollution, many different approaches can be undertaken in both urban and suburban areas. Buffer strips provide a barrier of grass in between impervious paving material like parking lots and roads, and the closest body of water. This allows the soil to absorb any pollution before it enters the local aquatic system. Retention ponds can be built in drainage areas to create an aquatic buffer between runoff pollution and the aquatic environment. Runoff and storm water drain into the retention pond allowing for the contaminants to settle out and become trapped in the pond. The use of porous pavement allows for rain and storm water to drain into the ground beneath the pavement, reducing the amount of runoff that drains directly into the water body. Restoration methods such as constructing wetlands are also used to slow runoff as well as absorb contamination.

Construction sites typically implement simple measures to reduce pollution and runoff. Firstly, sediment or silt fences are erected around construction sites to reduce the amount of sediment and large material draining into the nearby water body. Secondly, laying grass or straw along the border of construction sites also work to reduce nonpoint source pollution.

In areas served by single-home septic systems, local government regulations can force septic system maintenance to ensure compliance with water quality standards. In Washington (state), a novel approach was developed through a creation of a "shellfish protection district" when either a commercial or recreational shellfish bed is downgraded because of ongoing nonpoint source pollution. The shellfish protection district is a geographic area designated by a county to protect water quality and tideland resources, and provides a mechanism to generate local funds for water quality services to control nonpoint sources of pollution. At least two shellfish protection districts in south Puget Sound have instituted septic system operation and maintenance requirements with program fees tied directly to property taxes.

=== Agricultural operations ===
To control sediment and runoff, farmers may utilize erosion controls to reduce runoff flows and retain soil on their fields. Common techniques include contour plowing, crop mulching, crop rotation, planting perennial crops, or installing riparian buffers. Conservation tillage is a concept used to reduce runoff. The farmer leaves crop residues from previous plantings on and in the ground to help reduce splash and sheet erosion.

Nutrients are typically applied to farmland as commercial fertilizer; animal manure; or spraying of municipal or industrial wastewater (effluent) or sludge. Nutrients may also enter runoff from crop residues, irrigation water, wildlife, and atmospheric deposition. Farmers can develop and implement nutrient management plans to reduce excess application of nutrients.

To minimize pesticide impacts, farmers may use Integrated Pest Management (IPM) techniques (which can include biological pest control) to maintain control over pests, reduce reliance on chemical pesticides, and protect water quality.

=== Forestry operations ===
With a well-planned placement of both logging trails, also called skid trails, can reduce the amount of sediment generated. By planning the trails location as far away from the logging activity as possible as well as contouring the trails with the land, it can reduce the amount of loose sediment in the runoff. Additionally, by replanting trees on the land after logging, it provides a structure for the soil to regain stability as well as replaces the logged environment.

=== Marinas ===
Installing shut off valves on fuel pumps at a marina dock can help reduce the amount of spillover into the water. Additionally, pump-out stations that are easily accessible to boaters in a marina can provide a clean place in which to dispose of sanitary waste without dumping it directly into the water. Finally, something as simple as having trash containers around a marina can prevent larger objects entering the water.

== Country examples ==
=== United States ===
Nonpoint source pollution is the leading cause of water pollution in the United States today, with polluted runoff from agriculture and hydromodification the primary sources.

==== Regulation of Nonpoint Source Pollution in the United States ====
The definition of a nonpoint source is addressed under the U.S. Clean Water Act as interpreted by the U.S. Environmental Protection Agency (EPA). The law does not provide for direct federal regulation of nonpoint sources, but state and local governments may do so pursuant to state laws. For example, many states have taken the steps to implement their own management programs for places such as their coastlines, all of which have to be approved by the National Oceanic and Atmospheric Administration and the EPA. The goals of these programs and those alike are to create foundations that encourage statewide pollution reduction by growing and improving systems that already exist. Programs within these state and local governments look to best management practices (BMPs) in order to accomplish their goals of finding the least costly method to reduce the greatest amount of pollution. BMPs can be implemented for both agricultural and urban runoff, and can also be either structural or nonstructural methods. Federal agencies, including EPA and the Natural Resources Conservation Service, have approved and provided a list of commonly used BMPs for the many different categories of nonpoint source pollution.

==== U.S. Clean Water Act provisions for states ====
Congress authorized the CWA section 319 grant program in 1987. Grants are provided to states, territories, and tribes in order to encourage implementation and further development in policy. The law requires all states to operate NPS management programs. EPA requires regular program updates in order to effectively manage the ever-changing nature of their waters, and to ensure effective use of the 319 grant funds and resources.

The Coastal Zone Act Reauthorization Amendments (CZARA) of 1990 created a program under the Coastal Zone Management Act that mandates development of nonpoint source pollution management measures in states with coastal waters. CZARA requires states with coastlines to implement management measures to remediate water pollution, and to make sure that the product of these measures is implementation as opposed to adoption.

== See also ==
- Agricultural nutrient runoff
- stochastic empirical loading and dilution model
- Trophic state index (water quality indicator)
- Surface-water hydrology
- Water quality
- Water quality modelling
