= Riparian buffer =

Vegetated area near a stream, usually forested

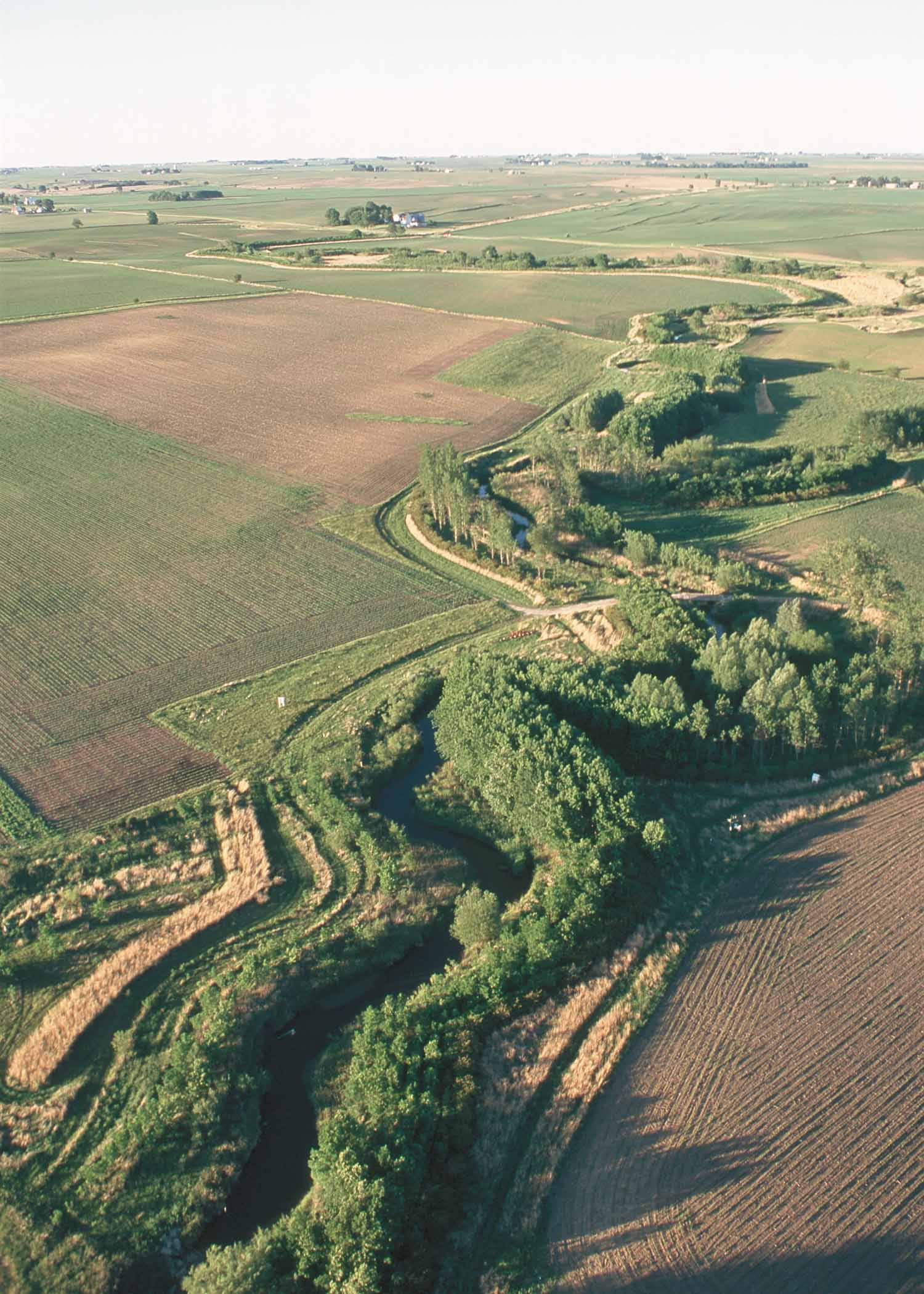
A riparian buffer of vegetation lining a farm creek in Story County, Iowa

A riparian buffer or stream buffer is a vegetated area (a "buffer strip") near a stream, usually forested, which helps shade and partially protect the stream from the impact of adjacent land uses. It plays a key role in increasing water quality in associated streams, rivers, and lakes, thus providing environmental benefits. With the decline of many aquatic ecosystems due to agriculture and forestry operations, riparian buffers have become a very common conservation practice aimed at increasing water quality and reducing pollution.

== Benefits ==
Riparian buffers act to intercept sediment, nutrients, pesticides, and other materials in surface runoff and reduce nutrients and other pollutants in shallow subsurface water flow. They also serve to provide habitat and wildlife corridors in primarily agricultural areas. They can also be key in reducing erosion by providing stream bank stabilization. Large scale results have demonstrated that the expansion of riparian buffers through the deployment of plantations systems can effectively reduce nitrogen emissions to water and soil loss by wind erosion, while simultaneously providing substantial environmental co-benefits, having limited negative effects on current agricultural production.

=== Water quality benefits ===
Riparian buffers intercept sediment and nutrients. They counteract eutrophication in downstream lakes and ponds which can be detrimental to aquatic habitats because of large fish kills that occur upon large-scale eutrophication. Riparian buffers keep chemicals, like pesticides, that can be harmful to aquatic life out of the water. Some pesticides can be especially harmful if they bioaccumulate in the organism, with the chemicals reaching harmful levels once they are ready for human consumption. Riparian buffers also stabilise the bank surrounding the water body which is important since erosion can be a major problem in agricultural regions when cut (eroded) banks can take land out of production. Erosion can also lead to sedimentation and siltation of downstream lakes, ponds, and reservoirs. Siltation can greatly reduce the life span of reservoirs and the dams that create the reservoirs.

=== Habitat benefits ===
Riparian buffers can act as crucial habitat for a large number of species, especially those who have lost habitat due to agricultural land being put into production. The habitat provided by the buffers also double as corridors for species that have had their habitat fragmented by various land uses. By adding this vegetated area of land near a water source, it increases biodiversity by allowing species an area to re-establish after being displaced due to non-conservation land use. With this re-establishment, the number of native species and biodiversity in general can be increased. The large trees in the first zone of the riparian buffer provide shade and therefore cooling for the water, increasing productivity and increasing habitat quality for aquatic species. When branches and stumps (large woody debris) fall into the stream from the riparian zone, more stream habitat features are created. Carbon is added as an energy source for biota in the stream.

=== Economic benefits ===
Buffers increase land value and allow for the production of profitable alternative crops. Vegetation such as black walnut and hazelnut, which can be profitably harvested, can be incorporated into the riparian buffer. Lease fees for hunting can also be increased as the larger habitat means that the land will be more sought after for hunting purposes. Designing buffer zones based on their hydrological function instead of a traditionally used fixed width method, can be economically beneficial in forestry practices.

== Design ==
Ground level view of riparian buffer between Munson Pond (off camera left) and an agricultural operation (off camera right), in Kelowna, British Columbia

A riparian buffer is usually split into three different zones, each having its own specific purpose for filtering runoff and interacting with the adjacent aquatic system. Buffer design is a key element in the effectiveness of the buffer. It is generally recommended that native species be chosen to plant in these three zones, with the general width of the buffer being 50 feet (15 m) on each side of the stream.

Zone 1
This zone should function mainly to shade the water source and act as a bank stabilizer. The zone should include large native tree species that grow fast and can quickly act to perform these tasks. Although this is usually the smallest of the three zones and absorbs the fewest contaminants, most of the contaminants have been eliminated by Zone 2 and Zone 3.

Zone 2
Usually made up of native shrubs, this zone provides a habitat for wildlife, including nesting areas for bird species. This zone also acts to slow and absorb contaminants that Zone 3 has missed. The zone is an important transition between grassland and forest.

Zone 3
This zone is important as the first line of defense against contaminants. It consists mostly of native grasses and serves primarily to slow water runoff and begin to absorb contaminants before they reach the other zones. Although these grass strips should be one of the widest zones, they are also the easiest to install.

Streambed Zone
The streambed zone of the riparian area is linked closely to Zone 1. Zone 1 provides fallen limbs, trees, and tree roots that in turn slow water flow, reducing erosional processes associated with increased water flow and flooding. This woody debris also increases habitat and cover for various aquatic species.

The US National Agroforestry Center has developed a filter strip design tool called AgBufferBuilder, which is a GIS-based computer program for designing vegetative filter strips around agricultural fields that utilizes terrain analysis to account for spatially non-uniform runoff.

=== Hydrologically adapted buffers ===
An alternative to the fixed width design is to adapt the buffer width according to local hydrological conditions. The amount of groundwater running into a stream is not always constant but can be concentrated in certain hotspots following topography. These groundwater discharge hotspots are connected to many riparian buffer functions such as: controlling stream water temperature, soil pH and acidity of the stream water and nutrient cycling and retention in the riparian zone. Groundwater discharge hotspots are also more rich in plant species compared to riparian zones without groundwater discharge. These discharge zones can extend further into the landscape than fixed riparian buffers widths but are disproportionately important to the buffer's functioning. To create buffers that take hydrology and ground water levels into account, soil wetness maps can be created from digital elevation models. These maps can identify areas where riparian buffers should be wider than a fixed-width buffer.

== Forest management ==
Logging is sometimes recommended as a management practice in riparian buffers, usually to provide economic incentive. However, some studies have shown that logging can harm wildlife populations, especially birds. A study by the University of Minnesota found that there was a correlation between the harvesting of timber in riparian buffers and a decline in bird populations. Therefore, logging is generally discouraged as an environmental practice, and left to be done in designated logging areas.

== Conservation incentives ==
The Conservation Reserve Program (CRP), a farming assistance program in the United States, provides many incentives to landowners to encourage them to install riparian buffers around water systems that have a high chance of non-point water pollution and are highly erodible. For example, the Nebraska system of Riparian Buffer Payments offers payments for the cost of setup, a sign up bonus, and annual rental payments.

These incentives are offered to agriculturists to compensate them for their economic loss of taking this land out of production. If the land is highly erodible and produces little economic gain, it can sometimes be more economic to take advantage of these CRP programs.

== Effectiveness ==
Riparian buffers have undergone much scrutiny about their effectiveness, resulting in thorough testing and monitoring. A study done by the University of Georgia, conducted over a nine-year period, monitored the amounts of fertilizers that reached the watershed from the source of the application. It found that these buffers removed at least 60% of the nitrogen in the runoff, and at least 65% of the phosphorus from the fertilizer application. The same study showed that the effectiveness of the Zone 3 was much greater than that of both Zone 1 and 2 at removing contaminants. But another study in 2017 did not find efficiency (or a very limiting capacity) for reducing glyphosate and AMPA leaching to streams; spontaneous herbaceous vegetation RBS is as efficient as Salix plantations and measures of glyphosate in runoff after a year, suggest an unexpected persistence and even a capacity of RBS to potentially favor glyphosate infiltration up to 70 cm depth in the soil.

== Long-term sustainability ==
After the initial installation of the riparian buffer, relatively little maintenance is needed to keep the buffer in good condition. Once the trees and grasses mature, they regenerate naturally and make a more effective buffer. The sustainability of the riparian buffer makes it extremely attractive to landowners since they do relatively little work and still receive payments. Riparian buffers have the potential to be the most effective way to protect aquatic biodiversity and water quality and manage water resources in developing countries that lack the funds to install water treatment and supply systems in midsize and small towns.

Riparian buffers can also be left after a forest harvest rather than being planted. The remaining trees are often vulnerable to windthrow without the protection of the surrounding forest stand. For these buffers to remain functional it is important that the vegetation is resilient and can withstand storms. Leaving a buffer with structural diversity, like in a multi-layered forest with trees at different heights leads to a more stable riparian zone with less windthrow and thus also more stable stream banks.

== Species selection ==
Species selection based on an area in Nebraska, as an example:

In Zone 1
Cottonwood, Bur Oak, Hackberry, Swamp White Oak, Siberian Elm, Honeylocust, Silver Maple, Black Walnut, and Northern Red Oak.

In Zone 2
Manchurian apricot, Silver Buffaloberry, Caragana, Black Cherry, Chokecherry, Sandcherry, Peking Cotoneaster, Midwest Crabapple, Golden Currant, Elderberry, Washington Hawthorn, American Hazel, Amur Honeysuckle, Common Lilac, Amur Maple, American Plum, and Skunkbush Sumac.

In Zone 3
Western Wheatgrass, Big Bluestem, Sand Bluestem, Sideoats Grama, Blue Grama, Hairy Grama, Buffalo Grass, Sand Lovegrass, Switchgrass, Little Bluestem, Indiangrass, Prairie Cordgrass, Prairie Dropseed, Tall Dropseed, Needleandthread, Green Needlegrass.

== See also ==
- Agricultural wastewater treatment
- Agroforestry
- Ecoscaping
- Erosion control
- Nonpoint source pollution
- Riparian zone
