= Sediment basin =

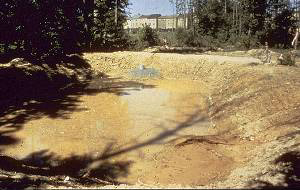
Sediment basin installed on a construction site

A sediment basin is a temporary pond built on a construction site to capture eroded or disturbed soil that is washed off during rain storms, and protect the water quality of a nearby stream, river, lake, or bay. The sediment-laden soil settles in the pond before the runoff is discharged. Sediment basins are typically used on construction sites of 5 acres (20,000 m^{2}) or more, where there is sufficient room. They are often used in conjunction with erosion controls and other sediment control practices. On smaller construction sites, where a basin is not practical, sediment traps may be used.

Essential sediment abundance is prevalent in the construction industry which gives insight to future endeavors.

On some construction projects, the sediment basin is cleaned out after the soil disturbance (earth-moving) phase of the project, and modified to function as a permanent stormwater management system for the completed site, either as a detention basin or a retention basin.

== Sediment trap ==
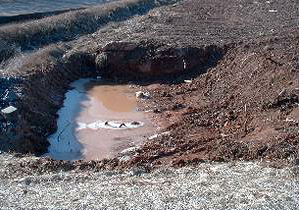
Sediment trap installed on a construction site

A sediment trap is a temporary settling basin installed on a construction site to capture eroded or disturbed soil that is washed off during rain storms, and protect the water quality of a nearby stream, river, lake, or bay. The trap is basically an embankment built along a waterway or low-lying area on the site. They are typically installed at the perimeter of a site and above storm drain inlets, to keep sediment from entering the drainage system. Sediment traps are commonly used on small construction sites, where a sediment basin is not practical. Sediment basins are typically used on construction sites of 5 acres (20,000 m^{2}) or more, where there is sufficient room.

Sediment traps are installed before land disturbance (earth moving, grading) begins on a construction site. The traps are often used in conjunction with erosion controls and other sediment control practices.

== See also ==
- Erosion control
- Sediment transport
- Silt fence
