= Soil erosion =

Displacement of soil by water, wind, and lifeforms

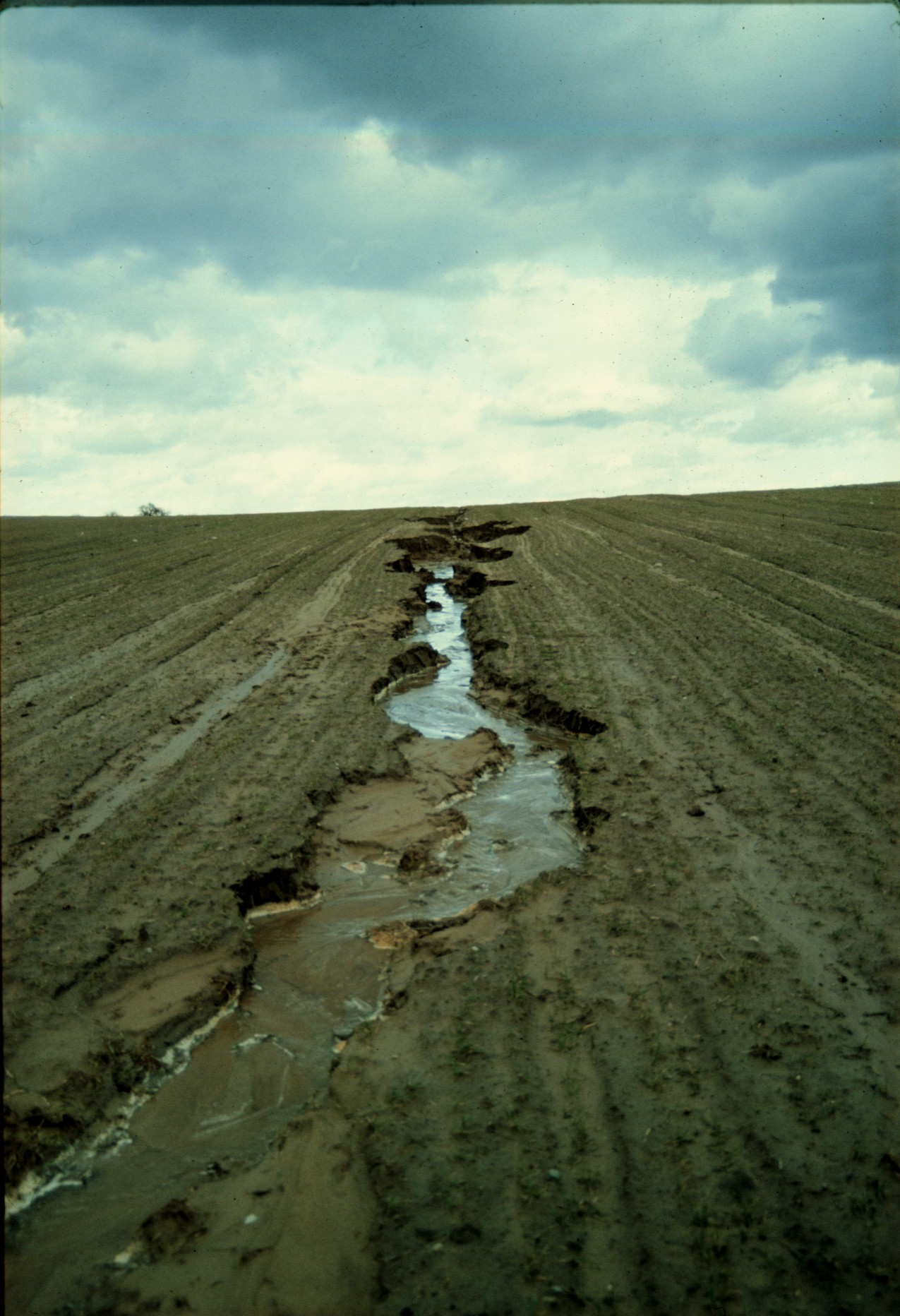
An actively eroding rill on an intensively-farmed field in eastern Germany

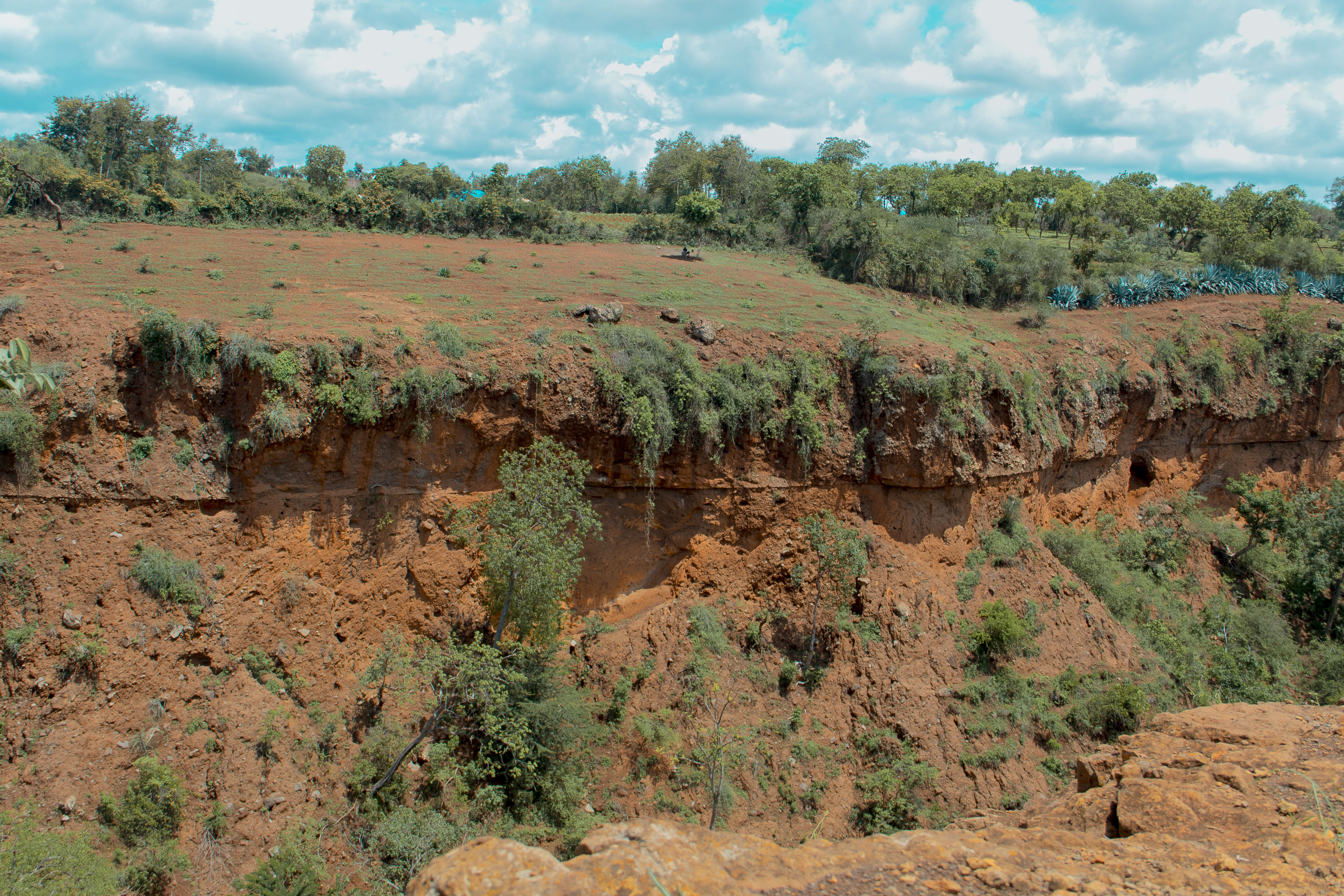
Soil erosion

Soil erosion is the denudation or wearing away of the upper layer of soil. It is a form of soil degradation. This natural process is caused by the dynamic activity of erosive agents, that is, water (e.g. landslide, flooding), ice (e.g. glaciers), snow (e.g. avalanches, snow gliding), air (e.g. wind), plants (e.g. tree uprooting), and animals (including humans). In accordance with these agents, erosion is sometimes divided into water erosion, glacial erosion, snow erosion, wind (aeolian) erosion, zoogenic erosion and anthropogenic erosion such as tillage erosion. Soil erosion may be a slow process that continues relatively unnoticed, or it may occur at an alarming rate causing a serious loss of topsoil. The loss of soil from farmland may be reflected in reduced cropland area and production potential, lower surface water quality and damaged drainage networks. Soil erosion could also cause sinkholes and soil pipes that can further develop into rills and gullies.

Human activities have increased by ca. 28 times the rate at which erosion is naturally occurring world-wide. Excessive (or accelerated) erosion causes both "on-site" and "off-site" problems. On-site impacts include decreases in agricultural productivity and (on natural landscapes) ecological collapse, both because of loss of the nutrient-rich upper soil layers. In some cases, the eventual result is desertification. Off-site effects include sedimentation of waterways and eutrophication of water bodies, as well as sediment-related damage to roads and houses. Water and wind erosion are the two primary causes of land degradation; combined, they are responsible for about 84% of the global extent of degraded land, making excessive erosion one of the most significant environmental problems worldwide.

Intensive agriculture, deforestation, roads, acid rains, anthropogenic climate change and urban sprawl are amongst the most significant human activities in regard to their effect on stimulating erosion. However, there are many prevention and remediation practices that can curtail or limit erosion of vulnerable soils.

== Physical processes ==
=== Rainfall and surface runoff ===
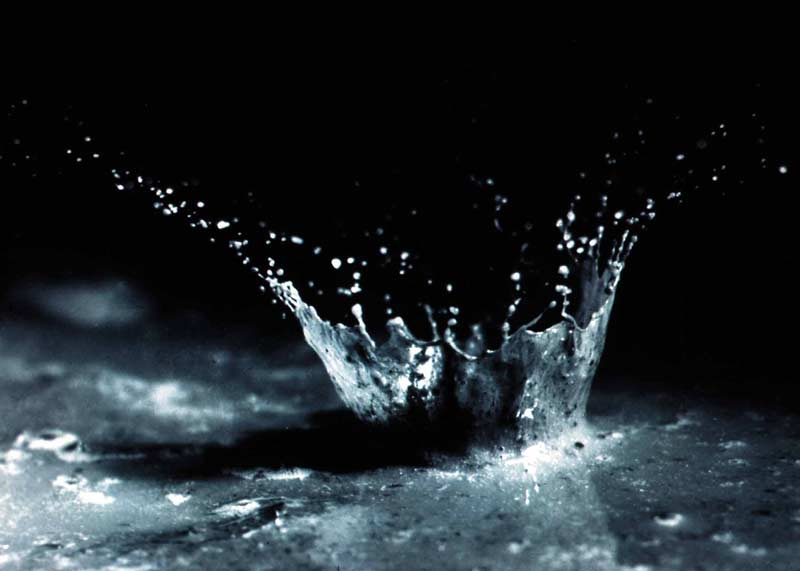
Soil and water being splashed by the impact of a single raindrop

If the soil is saturated, or if the rainfall rate is greater than the rate at which water can infiltrate into the soil, surface runoff occurs. If the runoff has sufficient flow energy, it will transport loosened soil particles (sediment) down the slope. Rainfall, and the surface runoff which may result from rainfall, produce four main types of soil erosion: splash erosion, sheet erosion, rill erosion, and gully erosion. Splash erosion is generally seen as the first and least severe stage in the soil erosion process, which is followed by sheet erosion, then rill erosion and finally gully erosion (the most severe of the four).

In splash erosion, the impact of a falling raindrop creates a small crater in the soil, ejecting soil particles. The distance the ejected soil particles travel can be as much as 0.6 m (two feet) vertically and 1.5 m (five feet) horizontally on level ground and in the absence of wind.

Sheet erosion is the transport of loosened soil particles by overland flow.

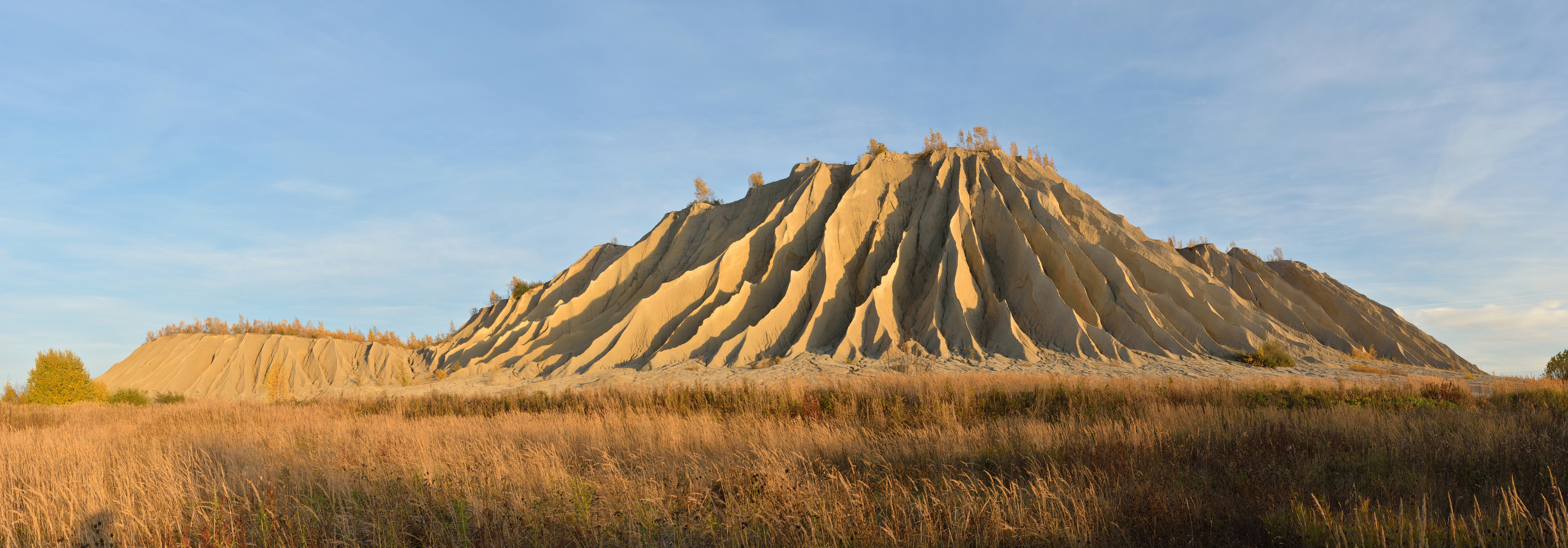
A spoil tip covered in rills and gullies due to erosion processes caused by rainfall: Rummu, Estonia

Rill erosion refers to the development of small, ephemeral concentrated flow paths which function as both sediment sources and sediment delivery systems for erosion on hillslopes. Generally, where water erosion rates on disturbed upland areas are greatest, rills are active. Flow depths in rills are typically of the order of a few centimeters (about an inch) or less and along-channel slopes may be quite steep. This means that rills exhibit hydraulic physics very different from water flowing through the deeper wider channels of streams and rivers.

Gully erosion occurs when runoff water accumulates and rapidly flows in narrow channels during or immediately after heavy rains or melting snow, removing soil to a considerable depth. Another cause of gully erosion is grazing, which often results in ground compaction. Because the soil is exposed, it loses the ability to absorb excess water, and erosion can develop in susceptible areas.

=== Rivers and streams ===
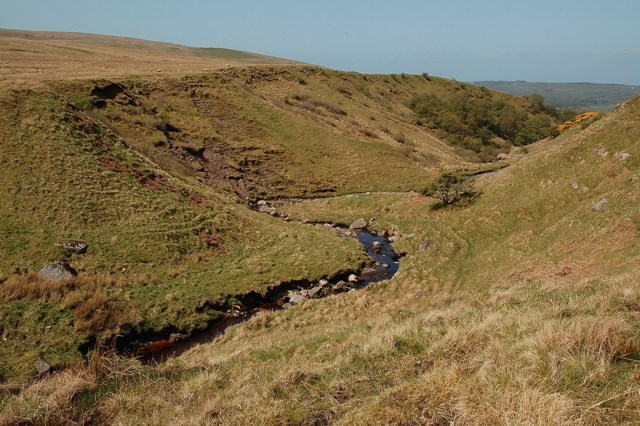
Dobbingstone Burn, Scotland—This photo illustrates two different types of erosion affecting the same place. Valley erosion is occurring due to the flow of the stream, and the boulders and stones (and much of the soil) that are lying on the edges are glacial till that was left behind as ice age glaciers flowed over the terrain.

Valley or stream erosion occurs with continued water flow along a linear feature. The erosion is both downward, deepening the valley, and headward, extending the valley into the hillside, creating head cuts and steep banks. In the earliest stage of stream erosion, the erosive activity is dominantly vertical, the valleys have a typical V cross-section and the stream gradient is relatively steep. When some base level is reached, the erosive activity switches to lateral erosion, which widens the valley floor and creates a narrow floodplain. The stream gradient becomes nearly flat, and lateral deposition of sediments becomes important as the stream meanders across the valley floor. In all stages of stream erosion, by far the most erosion occurs during times of flood, when more and faster-moving water is available to carry a larger sediment load. In such processes, it is not the water alone that erodes: suspended abrasive particles, pebbles and boulders can also act erosively as they traverse a surface, in a process known as traction.

Bank erosion is the wearing away of the banks of a stream or river. This is distinguished from changes on the bed of the watercourse, which is referred to as scour. Erosion and changes in the form of river banks may be measured by inserting metal rods into the bank and marking the position of the bank surface along the rods at different times.

Thermal erosion is the result of melting and weakening permafrost due to moving water. It can occur both along rivers and at the coast. Rapid river channel migration observed in the Lena River of Siberia is due to thermal erosion, as these portions of the banks are composed of permafrost-cemented non-cohesive materials. Much of this erosion occurs as the weakened banks fail in large slumps. Thermal erosion also affects the Arctic coast, where wave action and near-shore temperatures combine to undercut permafrost bluffs along the shoreline and cause them to fail. Annual erosion rates along a 100-kilometre (62-mile) segment of the Beaufort Sea shoreline averaged 5.6 metres (18 feet) per year from 1955 to 2002.

=== Floods ===
At extremely high flows, kolks, or vortices are formed by large volumes of rapidly rushing water. Kolks cause extreme local erosion, plucking bedrock and creating pothole-type geographical features called rock-cut basins. Examples can be seen in the flood regions result from glacial Lake Missoula, which created the channeled scablands in the Columbia Basin region of eastern Washington.

=== Wind erosion ===
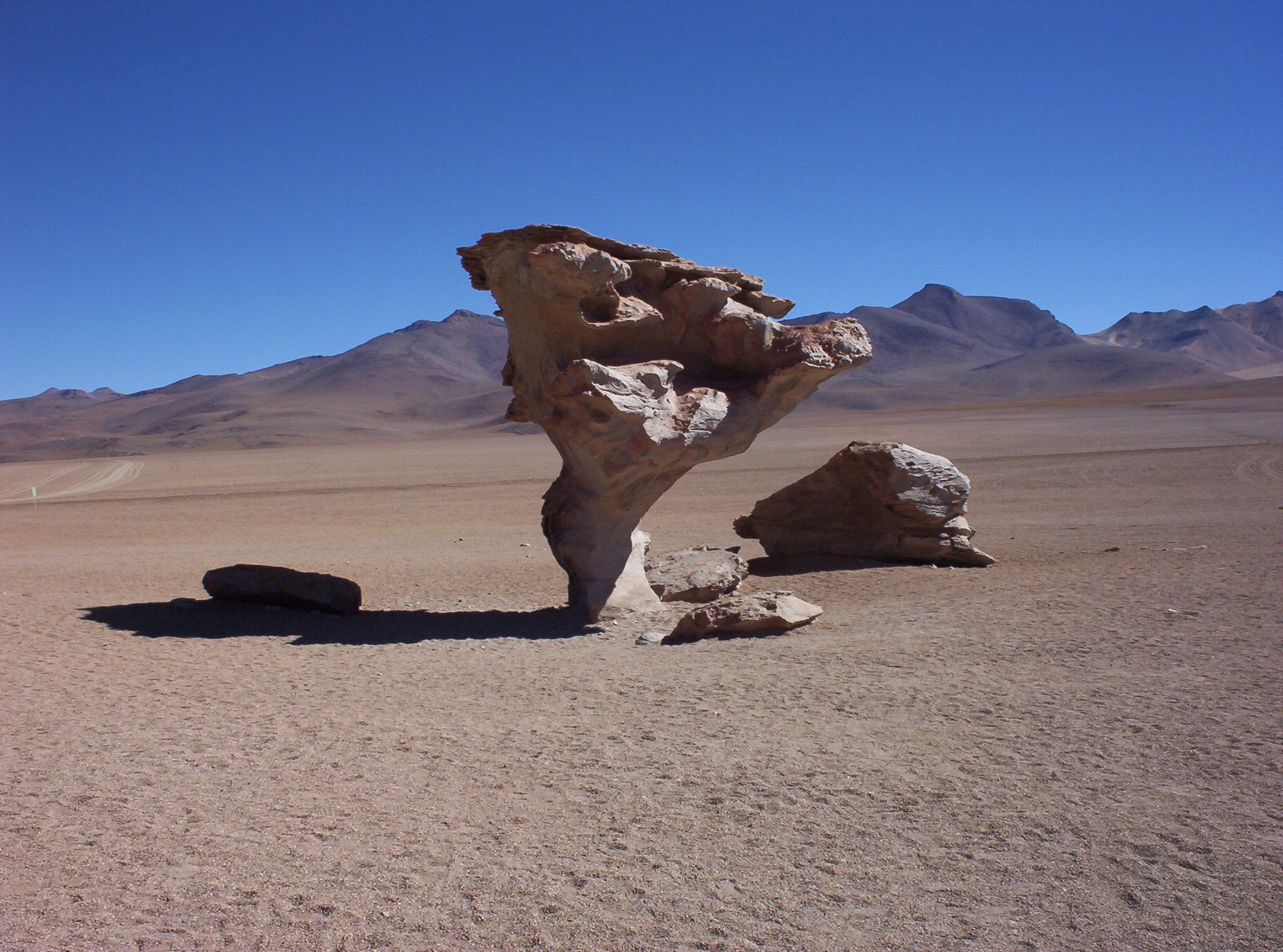
Árbol de Piedra, a rock formation in the Altiplano, Bolivia, sculpted by wind erosion

Wind erosion is a major geomorphological force, especially in arid and semi-arid regions. It is also a major source of land degradation, evaporation, desertification, harmful airborne dust, and crop damage—especially after being increased far above natural rates by human activities such as deforestation, urbanization, and agriculture.

Wind erosion is of two primary varieties: deflation, where the wind picks up and carries away loose particles; and abrasion, where surfaces are worn down as they are struck by airborne particles carried by wind. Deflation is divided into three categories: (1) surface creep, where larger, heavier particles slide or roll along the ground; (2) saltation, where particles are lifted a short height into the air, and bounce and saltate across the surface of the soil; and (3) suspension, where very small and light particles are lifted into the air by the wind, and are often carried for long distances (e.g. Saharan dust). Saltation is responsible for the majority (50–70%) of wind erosion, followed by suspension (30–40%), and then surface creep (5–25%). Silty soils (e.g. loess) tend to be the most affected by wind erosion; silt particles are relatively easily detached and carried away.

Wind erosion is much more severe in arid areas and during times of drought. For example, in the Great Plains, it is estimated that soil loss due to wind erosion can be as much as 6100 times greater in drought years than in wet years.

=== Mass movement ===
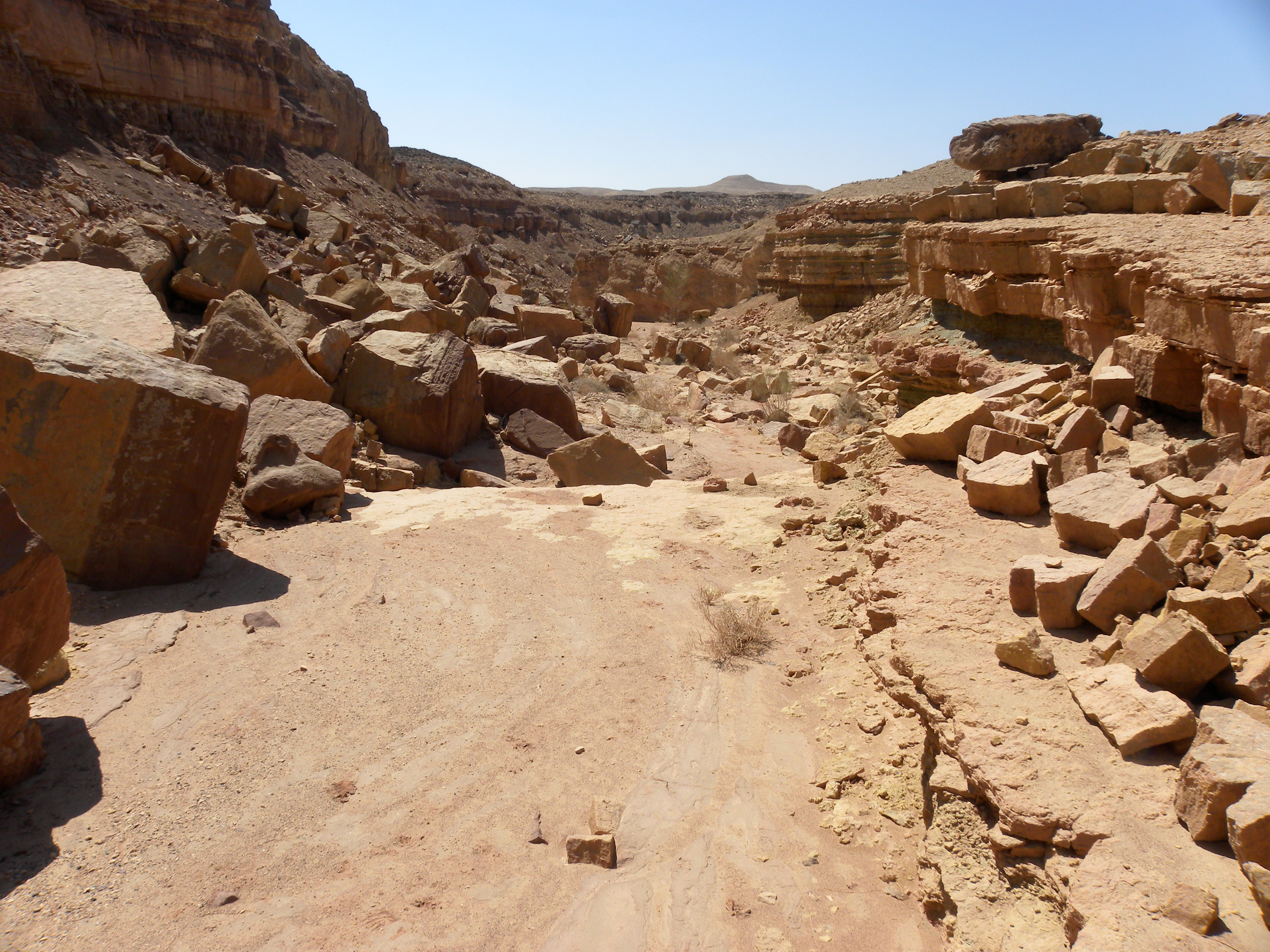
Wadi in Makhtesh Ramon, Israel, showing gravity collapse erosion on its banks

Mass movement is the downward and outward movement of rock and sediments on a sloped surface, mainly due to the force of gravity.

Mass movement is an important part of the erosional process, and is often the first stage in the breakdown and transport of weathered materials in mountainous areas. It moves material from higher elevations to lower elevations where other eroding agents such as streams and glaciers can then pick up the material and move it to even lower elevations. Mass-movement processes are always occurring continuously on all slopes; some mass-movement processes act very slowly; others occur very suddenly, often with disastrous results. Any perceptible downslope movement of rock or sediment is often referred to in general terms as a landslide. However, landslides can be classified in a much more detailed way that reflects the mechanisms responsible for the movement and the velocity at which the movement occurs. One of the visible topographical manifestations of a very slow form of such activity is a scree slope.

Slumping happens on steep hillsides, occurring along distinct fracture zones, often within materials like clay that, once released, may move quite rapidly downhill. They will often show a spoon-shaped isostatic depression, in which the material has begun to slide downhill. In some cases, the slump is caused by water beneath the slope weakening it. In many cases it is simply the result of poor engineering along highways where it is a regular occurrence.

Surface creep is the slow movement of soil and rock debris by gravity which is usually not perceptible except through extended observation. However, the term can also describe the rolling of dislodged soil particles 0.5 to 1.0 mm (0.02 to 0.04 in) in diameter by wind along the soil surface.

=== Tillage erosion ===
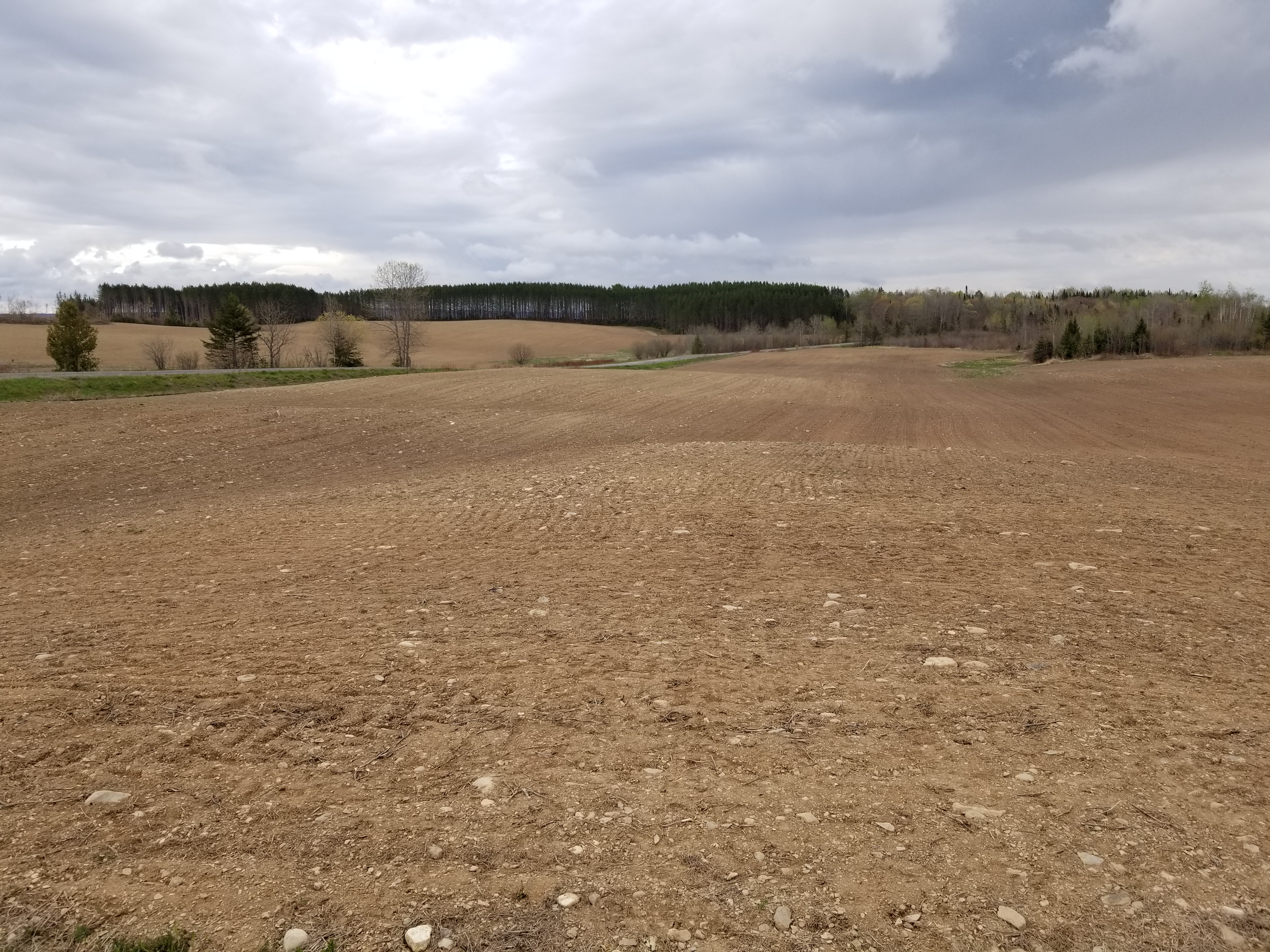
Eroded hilltops due to tillage erosion

Tillage erosion occurs in cultivated fields due to the movement of soil by tillage. There is growing evidence that tillage erosion is a major soil erosion process in agricultural land, surpassing water and wind erosion in many fields all around the world, especially on sloping and hilly lands. Eroded hilltops are actually caused by tillage erosion as water erosion mainly causes soil losses in the midslope and lowerslope segments of a slope, not the hilltops. Tillage erosion results in soil degradation, which can lead to significant reduction in crop yield and, therefore, economic losses for the farm.

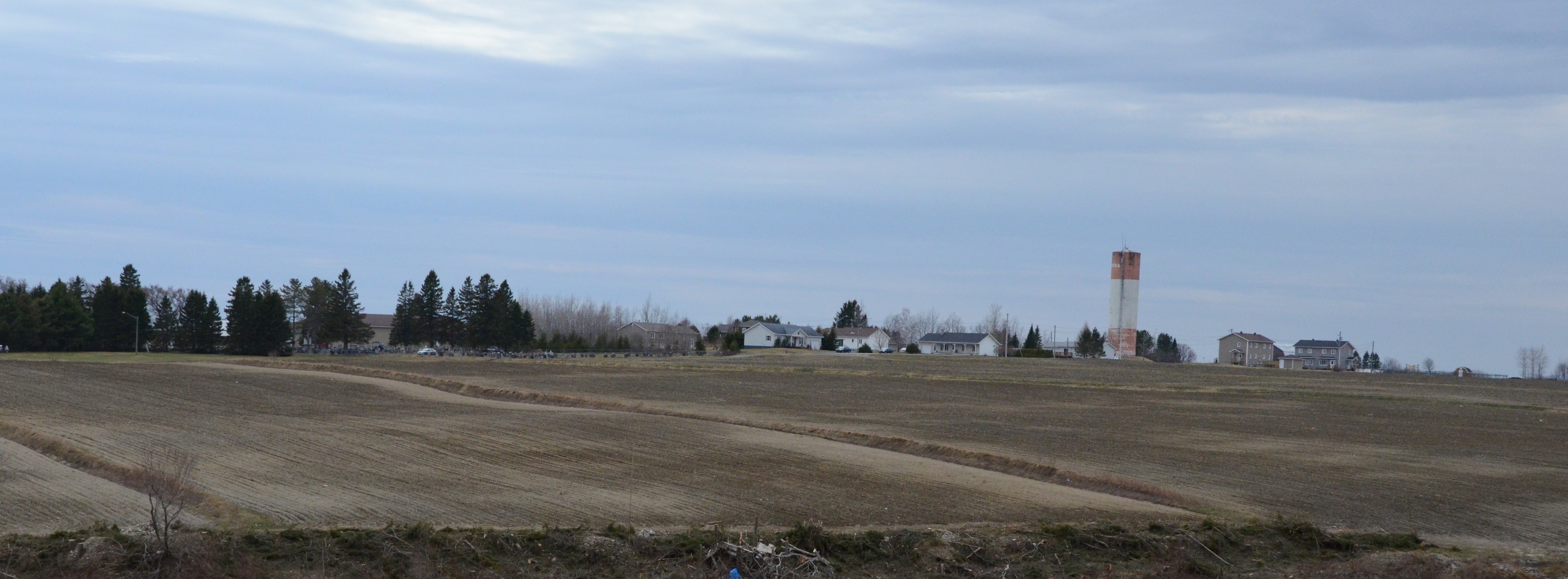
Tillage erosion in field with diversion terraces

== Factors affecting soil erosion ==
=== Climate ===
The amount and intensity of precipitation is the main climatic factor governing soil erosion by water. The relationship is particularly strong if heavy rainfall occurs at times when, or in locations where, the soil's surface is not well protected by vegetation. This might be during periods when agricultural activities leave the soil bare, or in semi-arid regions where vegetation is naturally sparse. Wind erosion requires strong winds, particularly during times of drought when vegetation is sparse and soil is dry (and so is more erodible). Other climatic factors such as average temperature and temperature range may also affect erosion, via their effects on vegetation and soil properties. In general, given similar vegetation and ecosystems, areas with more precipitation (especially high-intensity rainfall), more wind, or more storms are expected to have more erosion.

In some areas of the world (e.g. the Midwestern United States and the Amazon Rainforest), rainfall intensity is the primary determinant of erosivity, with higher intensity rainfall generally resulting in more soil erosion by water. The size and velocity of rain drops is also an important factor. Larger and higher-velocity rain drops have greater kinetic energy, and thus their impact will displace soil particles by larger distances than smaller, slower-moving rain drops.

In other regions of the world (e.g. western Europe), runoff and erosion result from relatively low intensities of stratiform rainfall falling onto previously saturated soil. In such situations, rainfall amount rather than intensity is the main factor determining the severity of soil erosion by water.

=== Soil structure and composition ===
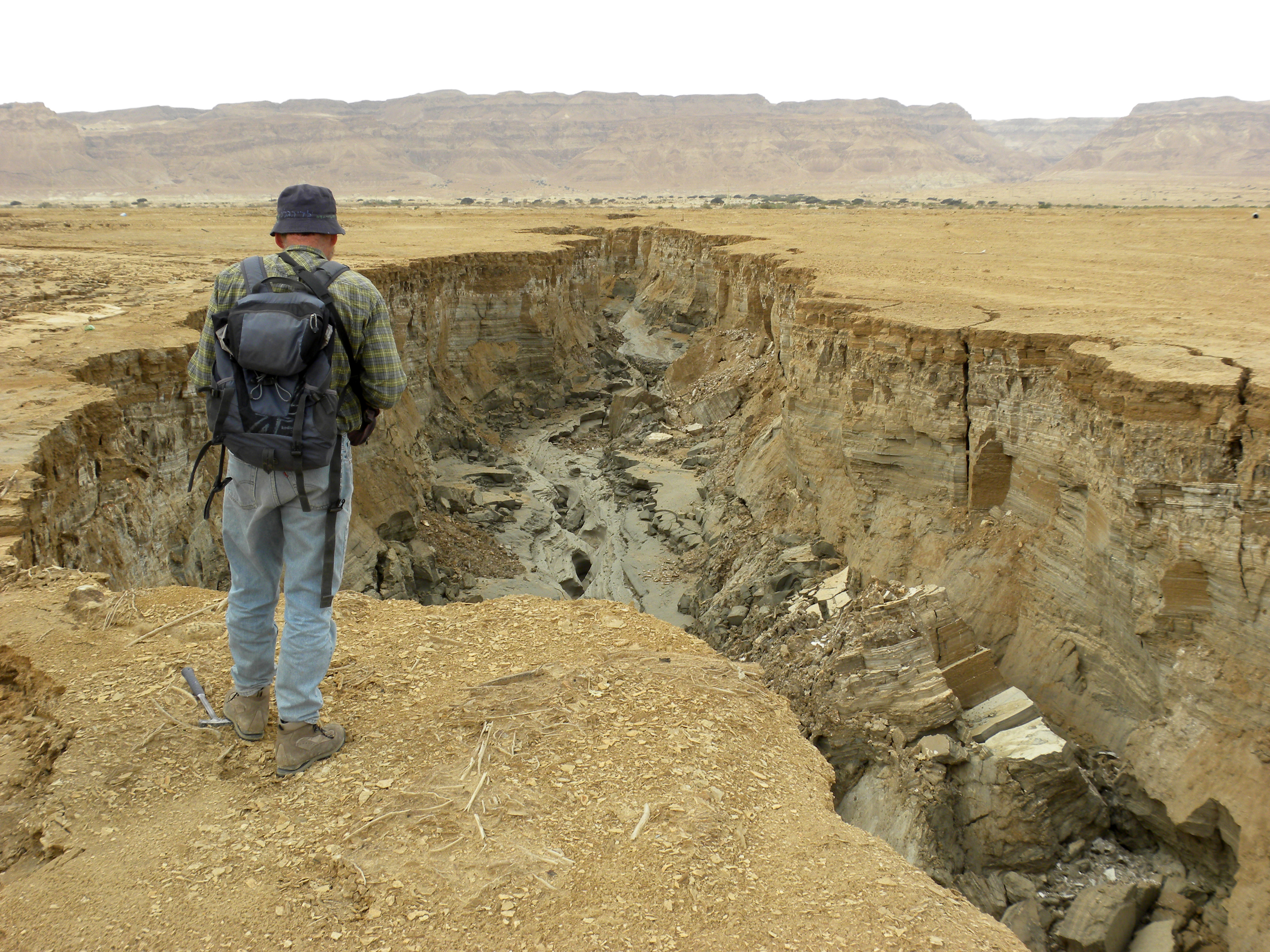
Erosional gully in unconsolidated Dead Sea (Israel) sediments along the southwestern shore. This gully was excavated by floods from the Judean Mountains in less than a year.

The texture, moisture, and compaction of soil are all major factors in determining the erosivity of rainfall. Sediments containing more clay minerals tend to be more resistant to erosion than those with sand or silt, because the clay helps bind soil particles together. Soil containing high levels of organic matter are often more resistant to erosion, because the organic materials coagulate soil colloids and create a stronger, more stable soil structure. The amount of water present in the soil before the precipitation also plays an important role, because it sets limits on the amount of water that can be absorbed by the soil (and hence prevented from flowing on the surface as erosive runoff). Wet, saturated soils will not be able to absorb as much rainwater, leading to higher levels of surface runoff and thus higher erosivity for a given volume of rainfall. Soil compaction also affects the permeability of the soil to water, and hence the amount of water that flows away as runoff. More compacted soils will have a larger amount of surface runoff than less compacted soils.

=== Vegetative cover ===
Vegetation acts as an interface between the atmosphere and the soil. It increases the permeability of the soil to rainwater, thus decreasing runoff. It shelters the soil from winds, which results in decreased wind erosion, as well as advantageous changes in microclimate. The roots of the plants bind the soil together, and interweave with other roots, forming a more solid mass that is less susceptible to both water and wind erosion. The removal of vegetation increases the rate of surface erosion.

=== Topography ===
The topography of the land determines the velocity at which surface runoff will flow, which in turn determines the erosivity of the runoff. Longer, steeper slopes (especially those without adequate vegetative cover) are more susceptible to very high rates of erosion during heavy rains than shorter, less steep slopes. Steeper terrain is also more prone to mudslides, landslides, and other forms of gravitational erosion processes.

== Human activities that aid soil erosion ==
=== Agricultural practices ===
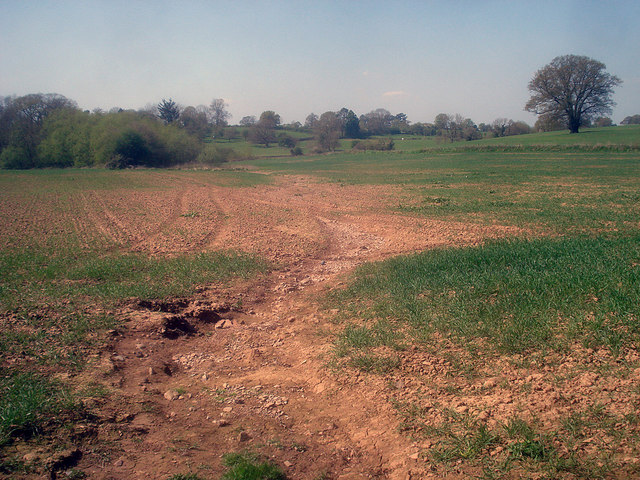
Tilled farmland such as this is very susceptible to erosion from rainfall, due to the destruction of vegetative cover and the loosening of the soil during plowing.

Unsustainable agricultural practices increase rates of erosion by one to two orders of magnitude over the natural rate and far exceed replacement by soil production. The tillage of agricultural lands, which breaks up soil into finer particles, is one of the primary factors. The problem has been exacerbated in modern times, due to mechanized agricultural equipment that allows for deep plowing, which severely increases the amount of soil that is available for transport by water erosion. Others include monocropping, farming on steep slopes, pesticide and chemical fertilizer usage (which kill organisms that bind soil together), row-cropping, and the use of surface irrigation. A complex overall situation with respect to defining nutrient losses from soils, could arise as a result of the size selective nature of soil erosion events. Loss of total phosphorus, for instance, in the finer eroded fraction is greater relative to the whole soil. Extrapolating this evidence to predict subsequent behaviour within receiving aquatic systems, the reason is that this more easily transported material may support a lower solution P concentration compared to coarser sized fractions. Tillage also increases wind erosion rates, by dehydrating the soil and breaking it up into smaller particles that can be picked up by the wind. Exacerbating this is the fact that most of the trees are generally removed from agricultural fields, allowing winds to have long, open runs to travel over at higher speeds. Heavy grazing reduces vegetative cover and causes severe soil compaction, both of which increase erosion rates.

=== Deforestation ===
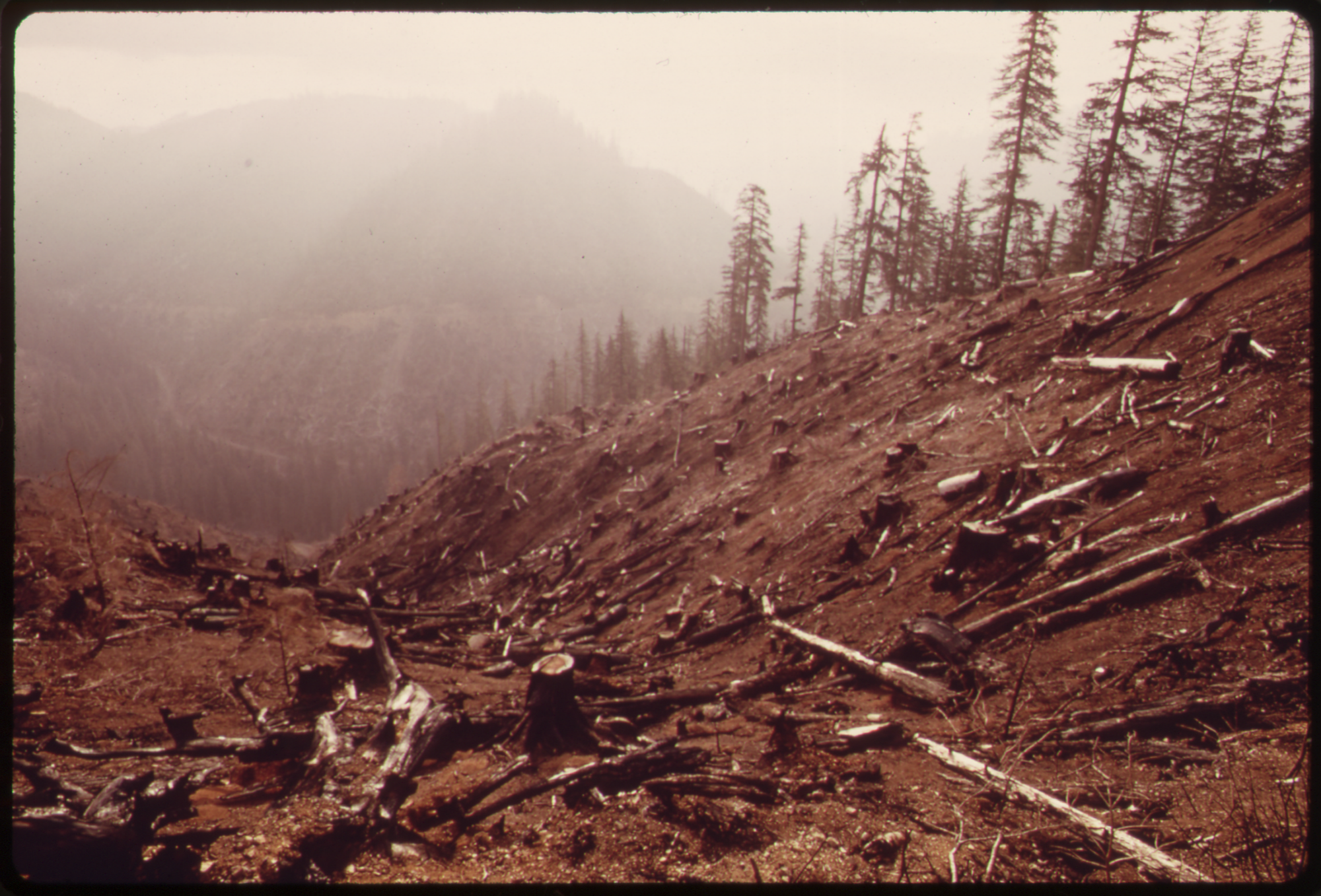
In this clearcut, almost all of the vegetation has been stripped from the surface of steep slopes, in an area with very heavy rains. Severe erosion occurs in cases such as this, causing stream sedimentation and the loss of nutrient-rich topsoil.

In an undisturbed forest, the mineral soil is protected by a layer of leaf litter and humus that covers the forest floor. These two layers form a protective mat over the soil that absorbs the impact of rain drops. They are porous and highly permeable to rainfall, and allow rainwater to slow percolate into the soil below, instead of flowing over the surface as runoff. The roots of trees and forest plants and the mycelia of forest fungi also play a major role in binding soil particles together, preventing them from being washed away. The vegetative cover acts to reduce the velocity of the raindrops that strike the foliage and stems before hitting the ground, reducing their kinetic energy. However it is the forest floor, more than the canopy, that prevents surface erosion. The terminal velocity of rain drops is reached in about 8 metres (26 feet). Because forest canopies are usually higher than this, rain drops can often regain terminal velocity even after striking the canopy. However, the intact forest floor, with its layers of leaf litter and organic matter (see humus form), is still able to absorb the impact of the rainfall.

Deforestation causes increased erosion rates due to exposure of mineral soil by removing the humus and litter layers from the soil surface, removing the vegetative cover that binds soil together, and causing heavy soil compaction from logging equipment. Once trees have been removed by fire or logging, infiltration rates become high and erosion low to the degree the forest floor remains intact. Severe fires can lead to significant further erosion if followed by heavy rainfall.

Globally one of the largest contributors to erosive soil loss is the slash-and-burn treatment of tropical forests. For example, on the Madagascar high central plateau, comprising approximately ten percent of that country's land area, virtually the entire landscape is sterile of vegetation, with gully erosive furrows typically in excess of 50 metres (160 ft) deep and 1 kilometre (0.6 miles) wide. Shifting cultivation (also called swidden cultivation) is a traditional farming system which sometimes incorporates the slash and burn method in some regions of the world. This degrades the soil and causes the soil to become less and less fertile. However, there is a debate about what is the worst practice in the tropics: slash-and-burn sustainable agriculture, with fast recovery of the secondary forest after a few years of soft subsistence agriculture, or permanent pastures and cash crops after conventional logging, with soil degradation (e.g. lateritization and soil compaction, respectively) preventing any hope of forest and soil regeneration? It has been shown in Brazil that along a complete cycle of slash-and-burn cultivation (including forest regrowth) runoff and soil loss decrease exponentially from the burned phase of shifting to the early stages of secondary forest, exhibiting patterns similar to those of a forested area after just 4–5 years of regeneration. Another Brazilian study showed that a fallow period of 15 years after a crop cycle of slash-and-burn agriculture can restore the original soil conditions.

=== Roads and human impact ===
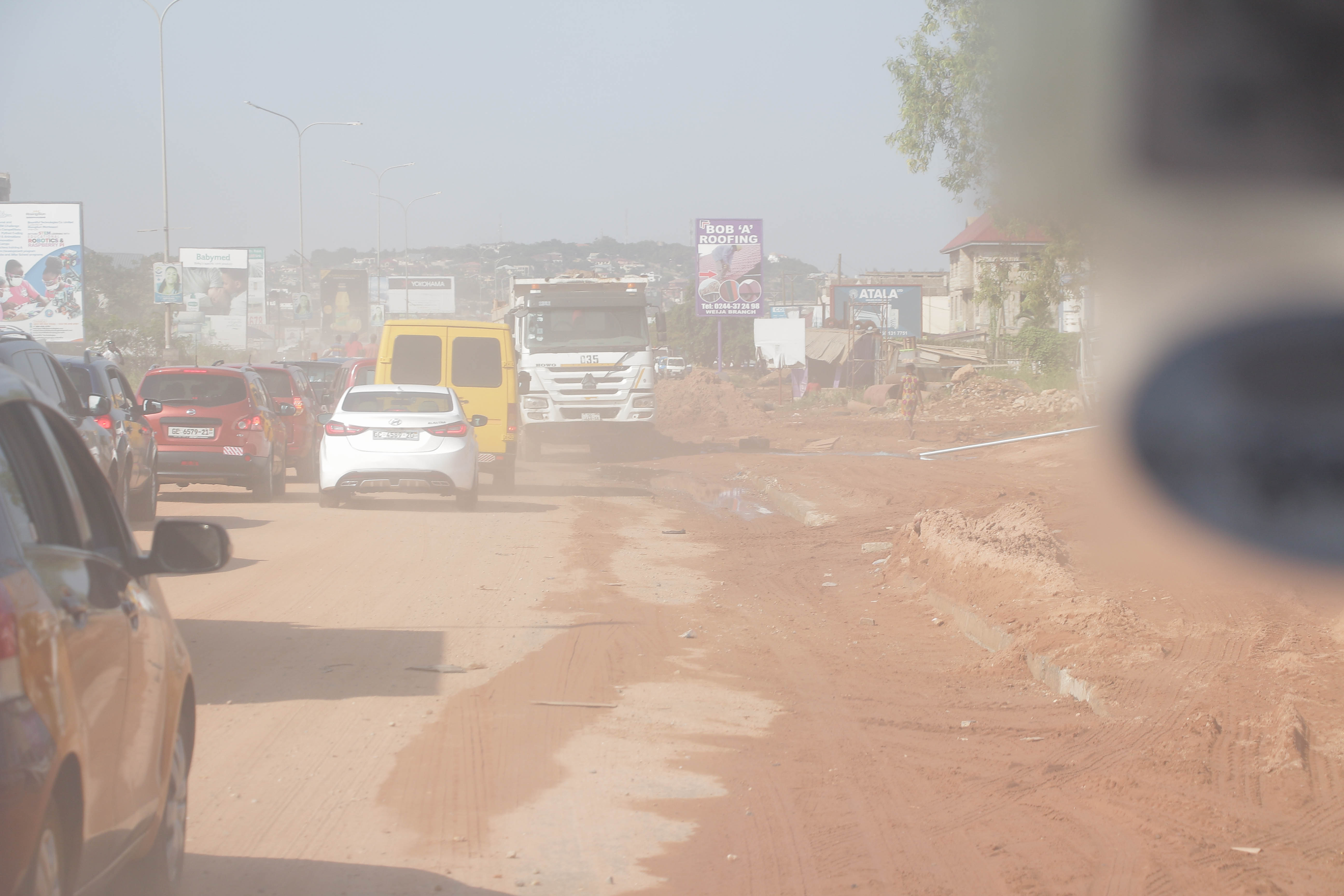
Erosion polluted the Kasoa highway after downpour in Ghana.

Human Impact has major effects on erosion processes, first by denuding the land of vegetative cover, altering drainage patterns, and compacting the soil during construction, and next by covering the land in an impermeable layer of asphalt or concrete that increases the amount of surface runoff and increases surface wind speeds. Much of the sediment carried in runoff from urban areas (especially roads) is highly contaminated with fuel, oil, and other chemicals. This increased runoff, in addition to eroding and degrading the land that it flows over, also causes major disruption to surrounding watersheds by altering the volume and rate of water that flows through them, and filling them with chemically polluted sedimentation. The increased flow of water through local waterways also causes a large increase in the rate of bank erosion.

=== Climate change ===
The warmer atmospheric temperatures observed over the past decades are expected to lead to a more vigorous hydrological cycle, including more extreme rainfall events. The rise in sea levels that has occurred as a result of climate change has also greatly increased coastal erosion rates.

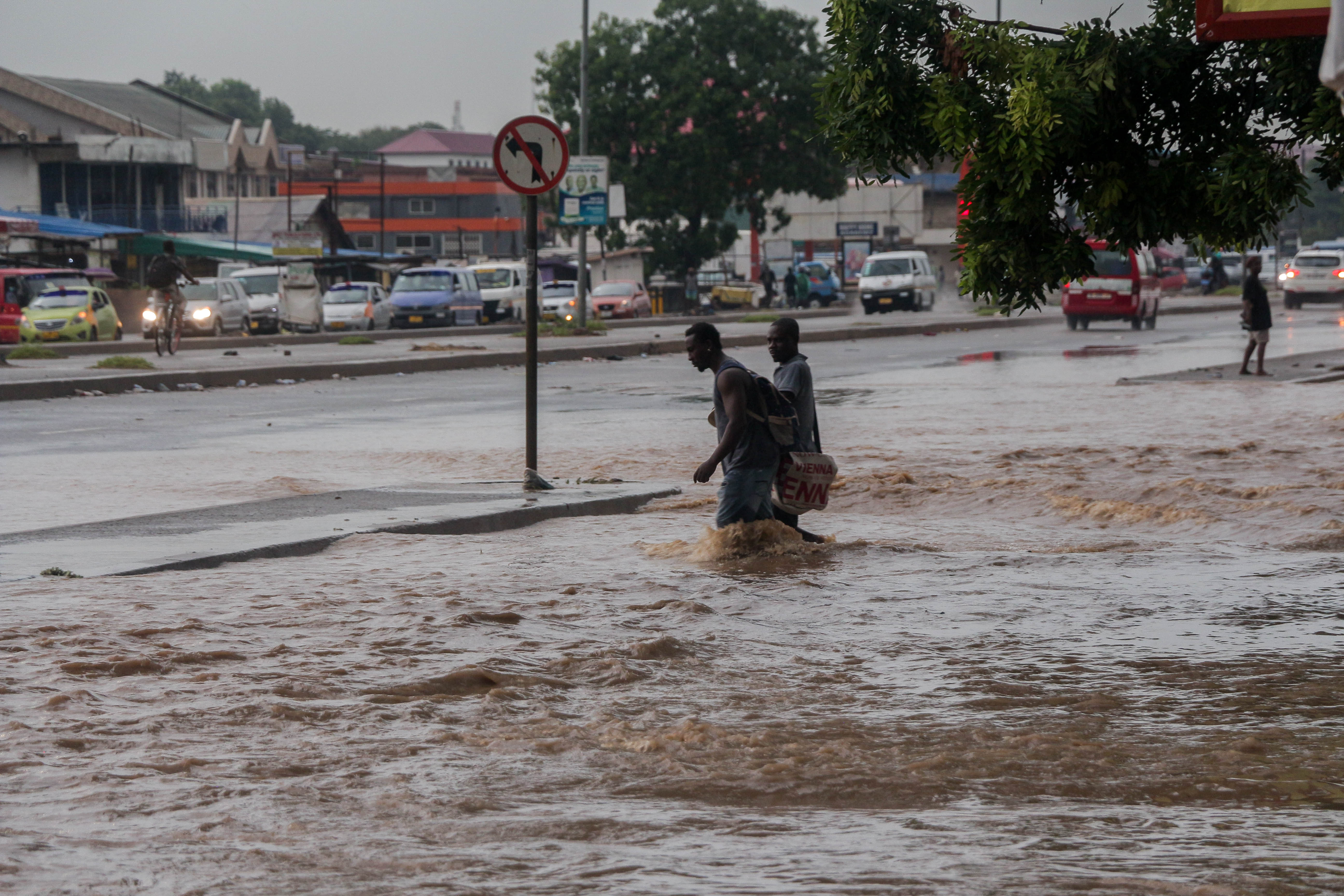
Most part of Accra mostly flooded during rainy season, causing environmental crisis in Ghana

Studies on soil erosion suggest that increased rainfall amounts and intensities will lead to greater rates of soil erosion. Thus, if rainfall amounts and intensities increase in many parts of the world as expected, erosion will also increase, unless amelioration measures are taken. Soil erosion rates are expected to change in response to changes in climate for a variety of reasons. The most direct is the change in the erosive power of rainfall. Other reasons include: a) changes in plant canopy caused by shifts in plant biomass production associated with moisture regime; b) changes in litter cover on the ground caused by changes in both plant residue decomposition rates driven by temperature and moisture dependent soil microbial activity as well as plant biomass production rates; c) changes in soil moisture due to shifting precipitation regimes and evapotranspiration rates, which changes infiltration and runoff ratios; d) soil erodibility changes due to decrease in soil organic matter concentrations in soils that lead to a soil structure that is more susceptible to erosion and increased runoff due to increased soil surface sealing and crusting; e) a shift of winter precipitation from non-erosive snow to erosive rainfall due to increasing winter temperatures; f) melting of permafrost, which induces an erodible soil state from a previously non-erodible one; and g) shifts in land use made necessary to accommodate new climatic regimes.

Studies by Pruski and Nearing indicated that, other factors such as land use unconsidered, it is reasonable to expect approximately a 1.7% change in soil erosion for each 1% change in total precipitation under climate change. Studies performed at the onset of the 21st century predicted increases of rainfall erosivity over the 21st century by 17% in the United States, by 18% in Europe, and globally 30 to 66%.

== Global environmental effects ==
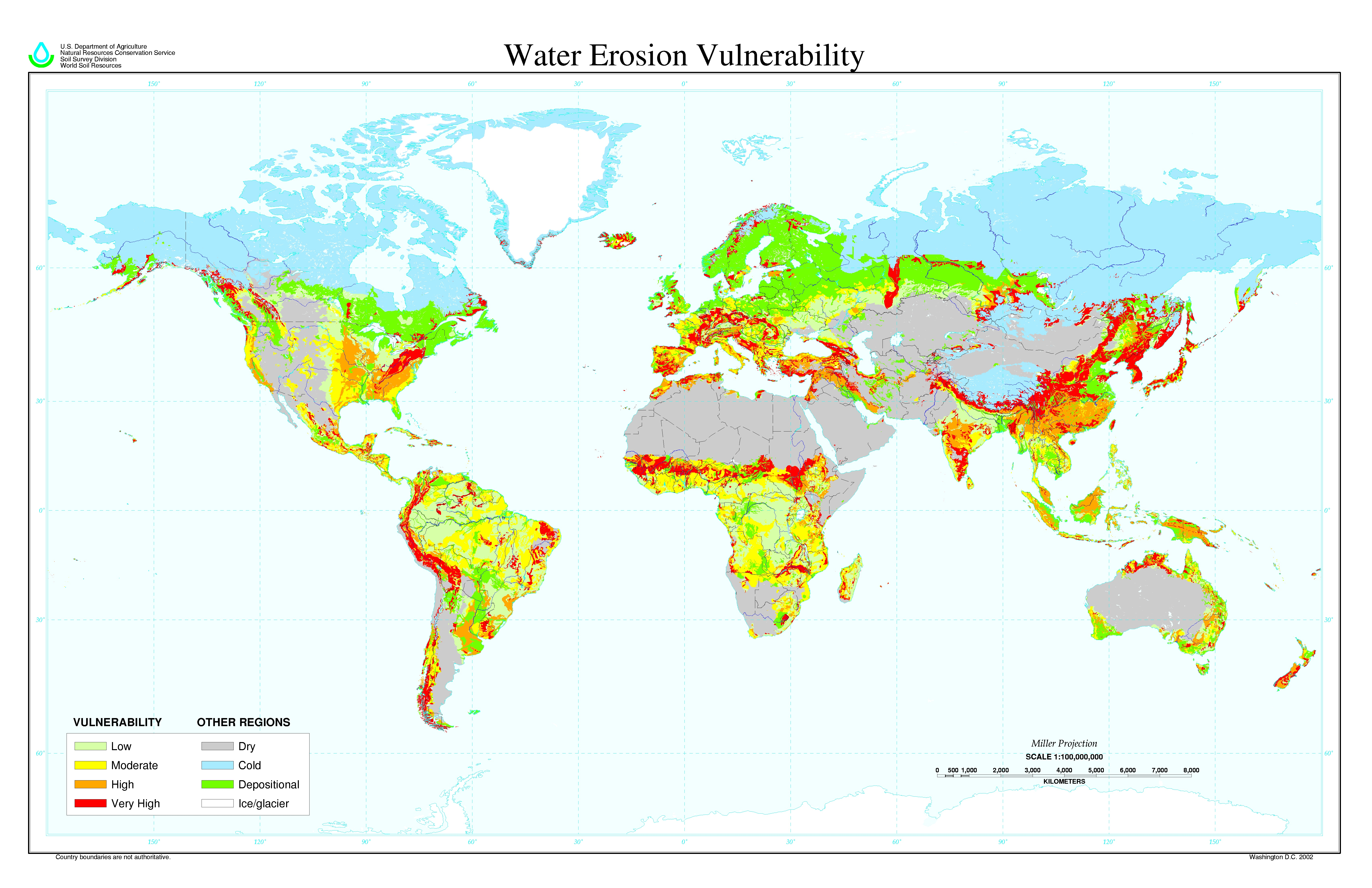
World map indicating areas that are vulnerable to high rates of water erosion

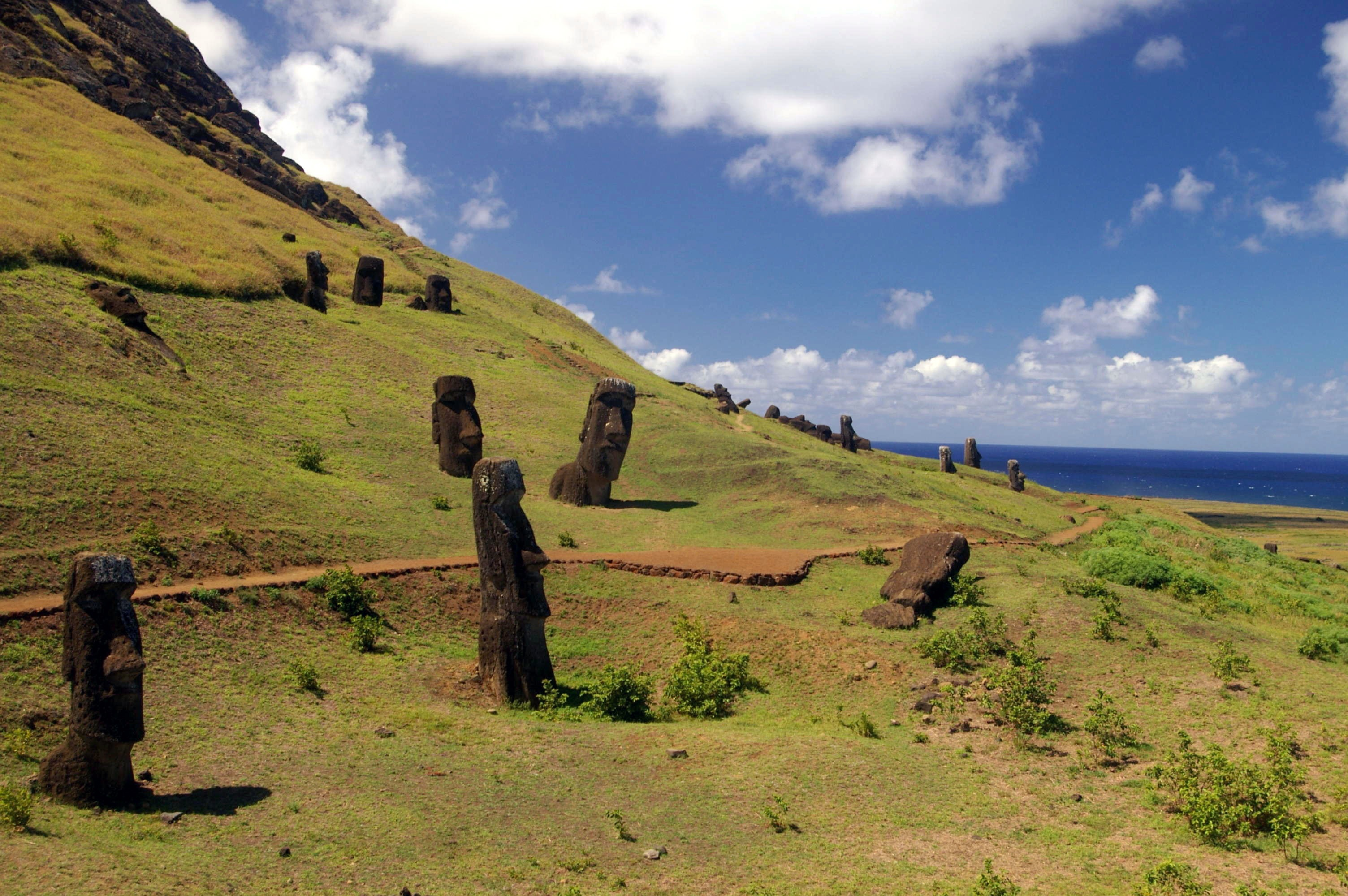
During the 17th and 18th centuries, Easter Island experienced severe erosion due to deforestation and unsustainable agricultural practices. The resulting loss of topsoil ultimately led to ecological collapse, causing mass starvation and the complete disintegration of the Easter Island civilization of Rapa Nui people.

Due to the severity of its ecological effects, and the scale on which it is occurring, erosion constitutes one of the most significant global environmental problems we face today.

=== Land degradation ===
Water and wind erosion are now the two primary causes of land degradation; combined, they are responsible for 84% of degraded acreage.

Each year, about 75 billion tons of soil is eroded from the land, a rate that is about 13–40 times as fast as the natural rate of erosion. Approximately 40% of the world's agricultural land is seriously degraded. According to the United Nations, an area of fertile soil the size of Ukraine is lost every year because of drought, deforestation and climate change. In Africa, if current trends of soil degradation continue, the continent might be able to feed just 25% of its population by 2025, according to UNU's Ghana-based Institute for Natural Resources in Africa.

Recent modeling developments have quantified rainfall erosivity at global scale using high temporal resolution (<30 min) and high fidelity rainfall recordings. An extensive global data collection effort produced the Global Rainfall Erosivity Database (GloREDa) which includes rainfall erosivity for 3,625 stations and covers 63 countries. This first ever Global Rainfall Erosivity Database was used to develop a global erosivity map at 30 arc-seconds(~1 km) based on sophisticated geostatistical process. According to a new study published in Nature Communications, almost 36 billion tons of soil is lost every year due to water, and deforestation and other changes in land use make the problem worse. The study investigates global soil erosion dynamics by means of high-resolution spatially distributed modelling (c. 250 × 250 m cell size). The geo-statistical approach allows, for the first time, the thorough incorporation into a global soil erosion model of land use and changes in land use, the extent, types, spatial distribution of global croplands and the effects of different regional cropping systems.

The loss of soil fertility due to erosion is further problematic because the response is often to apply chemical fertilizers, which leads to further water and soil pollution, rather than to allow the land to regenerate.

=== Sedimentation of aquatic ecosystems ===
Soil erosion (especially from agricultural activity) is considered to be the leading global cause of diffuse water pollution, due to the effects of the excess sediments flowing into the world's waterways. The sediments themselves act as pollutants, as well as being carriers for other pollutants, such as attached pesticide molecules or heavy metals.

The effect of increased sediments loads on aquatic ecosystems can be catastrophic. Silt can smother the spawning beds of fish, by filling in the space between gravel on the stream bed. It also reduces their food supply, and causes major respiratory issues for them as sediment enters their gills. The biodiversity of aquatic plant and algal life is reduced, and invertebrates are also unable to survive and reproduce. While the sedimentation event itself might be relatively short-lived, the ecological disruption caused by the mass die-off often persists long into the future.

Until measures taken in the 1980s for soil erosion control, one of the most serious and long-running water erosion problems worldwide was in the People's Republic of China, on the middle reaches of the Yellow River and the upper reaches of the Yangtze River. From the Yellow River, over 1.6 billion tons of sediment flows into the ocean each year, originating primarily from water erosion in the Loess Plateau region of the northwest.

=== Airborne dust pollution ===
Soil particles picked up during wind erosion of soil are a major source of air pollution, in the form of airborne particulates called dust. These airborne soil particles are often contaminated with toxic chemicals such as pesticides or petroleum fuels, posing ecological and public health hazards when they later land, or are inhaled/ingested.

Dust from erosion acts to suppress rainfall and changes the sky color from blue to white, which leads to an increase in red sunsets. Dust events have been linked to a decline in the health of coral reefs across the Caribbean and Florida, primarily since the 1970s. Similar dust plumes originate in the Gobi desert, which combined with pollutants, spread large distances downwind, or eastward, into North America.

== Monitoring, measuring and modelling soil erosion ==
Monitoring and modeling of erosion processes can help people better understand the causes of soil erosion, make predictions of erosion under a range of possible conditions, and plan the implementation of preventative and restorative strategies for erosion. However, the complexity of erosion processes and the number of scientific disciplines that must be considered to understand and model them (e.g. climatology, hydrology, geology, soil science, agriculture, chemistry, physics, etc.) makes accurate modelling challenging. Erosion models are also non-linear, which makes them difficult to work with numerically, and makes it difficult or impossible to scale up to making predictions about large areas from data collected by sampling smaller plots.

The most commonly used model for predicting soil loss from water erosion is the Universal Soil Loss Equation (USLE). This was developed in the 1960s and 1970s. It estimates the average annual soil loss A on a plot-sized area as:

A = RKLSCP

where R is the rainfall erosivity factor, K is the soil erodibility factor, L and S are topographic factors representing length and slope, respectively, C is the cover and management factor and P is the support practices factor.

Despite the USLE's plot-scale spatial basis, the model has often been used to estimate soil erosion on much larger areas, such as watersheds, continents, and globally. One major problem is that the USLE cannot simulate gully erosion, and so erosion from gullies is ignored in any USLE-based assessment of erosion. Yet erosion from gullies can be a substantial proportion (10–80%) of total erosion on cultivated and grazed land.

During the 50 years since the introduction of the USLE, many other soil erosion models have been developed. But because of the complexity of soil erosion and its constituent processes, all erosion models can only roughly approximate actual erosion rates when validated i.e. when model predictions are compared with real-world measurements of erosion. Thus new soil erosion models continue to be developed. Some of these remain USLE-based, e.g. the G2 model. Other soil erosion models have largely (e.g. the Water Erosion Prediction Project model) or wholly (e.g. RHEM, the Rangeland Hydrology and Erosion Model) abandoned usage of USLE elements. Global studies continue to be based on the USLE.

On a smaller scale (e.g. for individual channels, dams, or spillways), there are erosion rate models available based on the critical shear stress of erosion as well as the erodibility of the soil. These can be measured using geotechnical engineering methods such as the hole erosion test or the jet erosion test.

== Prevention and remediation ==
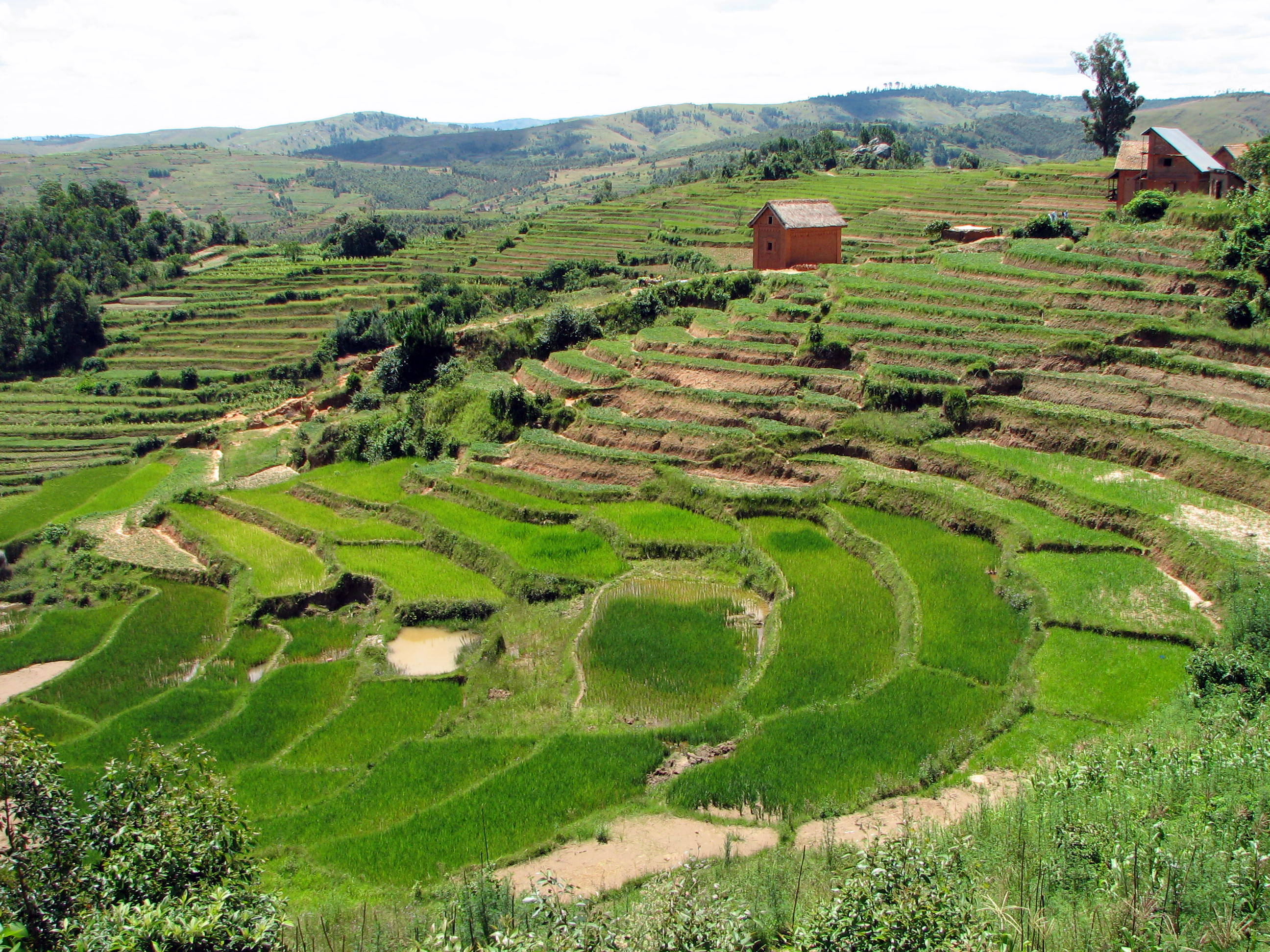
Terracing is an ancient technique that can significantly slow the rate of water erosion on cultivated slopes.

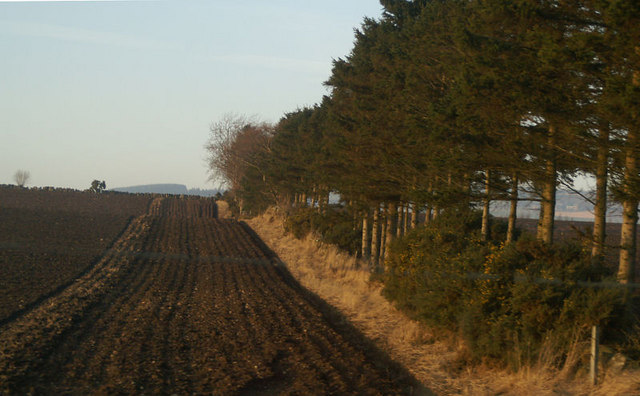
A windbreak (the row of trees) planted next to an agricultural field, acting as a shield against strong winds. This reduces the effects of wind erosion, and provides many other benefits.

The most effective known method for erosion prevention is to increase vegetative cover on the land, which helps prevent both wind and water erosion.

Terracing is an extremely effective means of erosion control, which has been practiced for thousands of years by people all over the world.

Windbreaks (also called shelterbelts) are rows of trees and shrubs that are planted along the edges of agricultural fields, to shield the fields against winds. In addition to significantly reducing wind erosion, windbreaks provide many other benefits such as improved microclimates for crops (which are sheltered from the dehydrating and otherwise damaging effects of wind), habitat for beneficial bird species, carbon sequestration, and aesthetic improvements to the agricultural landscape.

Traditional planting methods, such as mixed-cropping (instead of monocropping) and crop rotation, have also been shown to significantly reduce erosion rates.

Crop residues play a role in the mitigation of erosion by conservation tillage methods, because they reduce the impact of raindrops breaking up the soil particles.

There is a higher potential for erosion when producing potatoes than when growing cereals, or oilseed crops. Forages have a fibrous root system, which helps combat erosion by anchoring the plants to the top layer of the soil, and covering the entirety of the field, as it is a non-row crop. In tropical coastal systems, properties of mangroves have been examined as a potential means to reduce soil erosion. Their complex root structures are known to help reduce wave damage from storms and flood impacts while binding and building soils. These roots can slow down water flow, leading to the deposition of sediments and reduced erosion rates. However, in order to maintain sediment balance, adequate mangrove forest width needs to be present.

Agroforestry, the mixing of agricultural crops with trees, is an efficient mean of mitigating soil erosion, in particular in tropical climates with heavy rains, but also everywhere land has been severely degraded by intensive agriculture activities (e.g. ravine lands). Trees act as shelters against wind (thus mitigating wind erosion) and rain (thus mitigating splash erosion and surface runoff).

== See also ==
- Badlands
- Biorhexistasy
- Bridge scour
- Cellular confinement
- Coastal sediment supply
- Food security
- Geomorphology
- Groundwater sapping
- Highly erodible land
- Ice jacking
- Lessivage
- Riparian zone
- Sediment transport
- Soil horizon
- Soil type
- Sphericity
- Tillage erosion
- Vegetation and slope stability
- Vetiver System
