= Tillage erosion =

Form of soil erosion

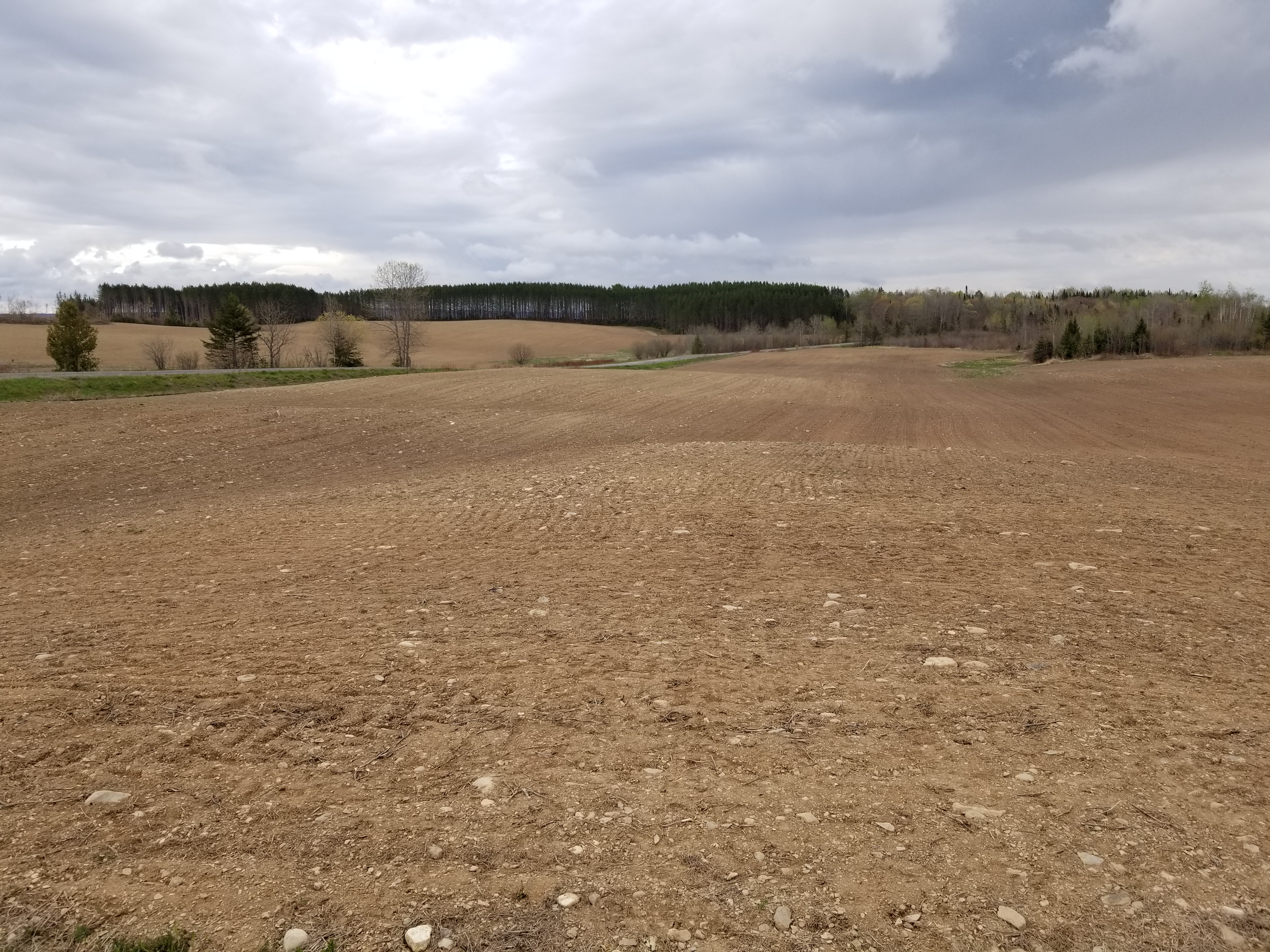
Eroded hilltops due to tillage erosion

Tillage erosion is a form of soil erosion occurring in cultivated fields due to the movement of soil by tillage. There is growing evidence that tillage erosion is a major soil erosion process in agricultural lands, surpassing water and wind erosion in many fields all around the world, especially on sloping and hilly lands. A signature spatial pattern of soil erosion shown in many water erosion handbooks and pamphlets, the eroded hilltops, is actually caused by tillage erosion as water erosion mainly causes soil losses in the midslope and lowerslope segments of a slope, not the hilltops. Tillage erosion results in soil degradation, which can lead to significant reduction in crop yield and, therefore, economic losses for the farm.

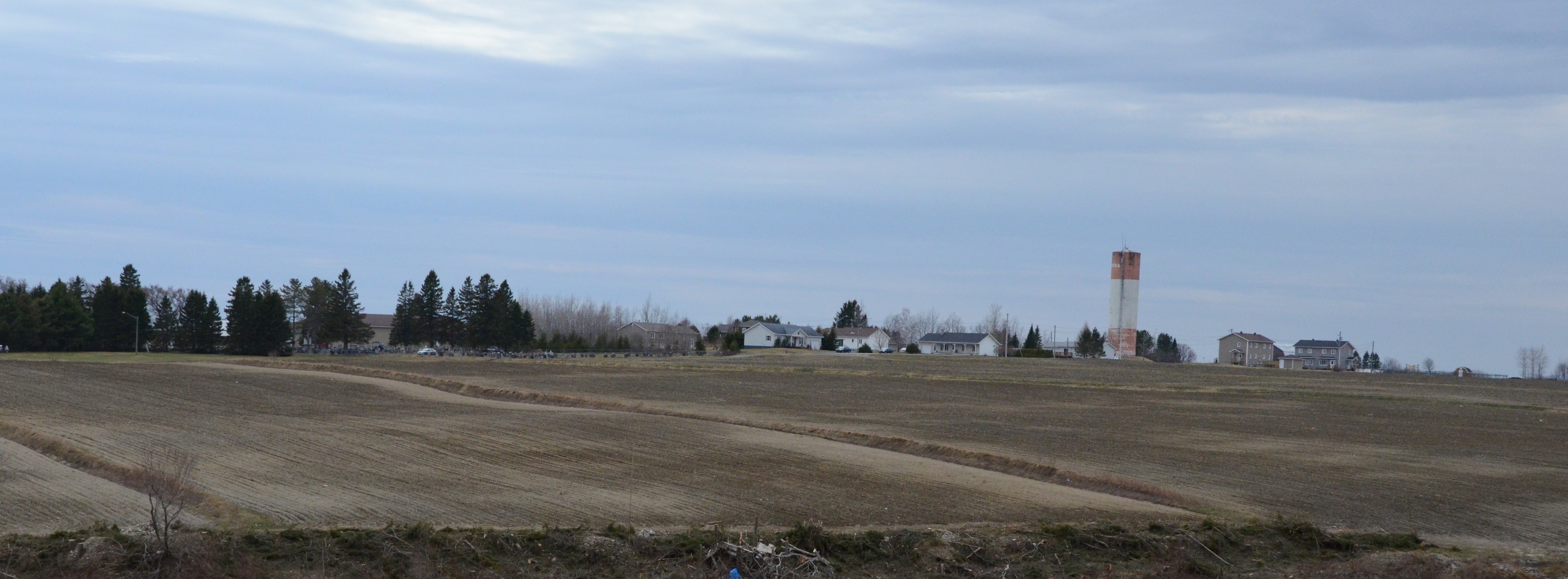
Tillage erosion in field with diversion terraces

== Physical process ==
Conceptually, the process of tillage erosion (E_{Ti}) can be described as a function of tillage erosivity (ET) and landscape erodibility (EL):

E_{Ti} = f(ET, EL)

Tillage erosivity (ET) is defined as the propensity of a tillage operation, or a sequence of operations, to erode soil and is affected by the design and operation of the tillage implement (e.g., the size, arrangement and shape of tillage tools, tillage speed and depth). Landscape erodibility (EL) is defined as the propensity of a landscape to be eroded by tillage and is affected by the landscape topography (e.g., slope gradient and slope curvature) and soil properties (e.g., texture, structure, bulk density and soil moisture content).

Tillage erosion occurs as a result of changes in tillage translocation (soil movement by tillage) across the field. Tillage translocation is expressed as a linear function of slope gradient (θ) and slope curvature (φ):

T_{M} = α + β θ + γ φ

where T_{M} is tillage translocation; α is the tillage translocation on flat soil surface; β and γ are coefficients which describe the additional translocation resulting from slope gradient and slope curvature, respectively. Tillage erosion, which is the net tillage translocation, is then calculated as:

T_{M}^{Net} = ΔT_{M} = β Δθ + γ Δφ

For a unit area A in a cultivated field, tillage erosion rate for a tillage operation can be calculated as:

E_{Ti} = (T_{M}^{out} – T_{M}^{in}) / A = [β (θ^{out} - θ^{in}) + γ (φ^{out} - φ^{in})] / A

where E_{Ti} is tillage erosion rate for the tillage operation; T_{M}^{out} is the outgoing tillage translocation or the amount of soil moving out from A; and T_{M}^{in} is the incoming tillage translocation or the amount of soil moving into A; θ^{out} is the outgoing slope gradient along the tillage direction, θ^{in} is the incoming slope gradient along the tillage direction; φ^{out} is the outgoing slope curvature along the tillage direction, φ^{in} is the incoming slope curvature along the tillage direction.

== Spatial patterns ==
Typical spatial patterns of tillage erosion observed in cultivated field are either local topography related: soil loss from hilltops (convexities) and soil accumulation in depressions (concavities); or field boundary related: soil loss from the downside of a field boundary and soil accumulation in the upper-side of a field boundary. Local topography related tillage erosion is most pronounced in hummocky landscapes with eroded hilltops that often exhibit a light soil color due to the loss of organic-rich topsoil, a phenomenon often mistakenly assumed to be the result of water erosion. Field boundary related tillage erosion is determined by not only topography but also tillage directions and it is responsible for the forming of tillage banks and terraces.

== Measurement ==
Tillage erosion can be measured via the measurement of tillage translocation or the measurement of soil loss and accumulation. Tillage translocation is normally measured with a tracer that is incorporated into the soil in plots. The distributions of the tracer before and after tillage are used to calculate tillage translocation. Two types of tracers, point tracers, and bulk tracers are being used. Whereas point tracers are easy to implement, bulk tracers can provide more information regarding the dispersion of the soil during the translocation process. Soil loss and accumulation by tillage erosion can be estimated from changes in surface elevation. For example, elevation of a tilled field can be compared to an adjacent reference object that has not been eroded such as a fence line or hedgerow. Decreases in surface elevation indicate soil losses while increases in elevation are evidence of soil accumulations. Elevation change can also be determined by taking repeated measurements of the soil surface elevations with high accuracy topographic survey techniques such as RTK GPS, total station and close range photogrammetry. Another way to estimate soil loss and accumulation is to measure the changes in soil properties, such as soil organic matter content. However, soil organic matter can be affected by many factors so it is not a very reliable method. Since the 1980s, radioisotopes such as Cs-137 and Pb-210 have been used to provide much more accurate soil erosion estimates.

== Modeling ==
=== Hillslope model (one-dimensional) ===
- The Tillage Erosion Risk Indicator (TillERI) is a simplified tillage erosion model used to estimate the risk of tillage erosion in agricultural lands at the national scale in Canada. It is one of the erosion indicators as part of the Agri-Environmental indicators developed under the National Agri-Environmental Health Analysis and Reporting Program (NAHARP). Input data include hillslope length, slope gradient of the eroding segment, and the erosivity of the tillage operations (β value). Output data from the model include tillage erosion rate at the erosion segment and the risk level for tillage erosion for that hillslope.
- The Tillage Erosion Prediction (TEP) model is designed to calculate net soil movement for individual hillslope segments across a field transect for individual tillage operations. Input data include hillslope segment elevation, slope gradient, and segment length as well as the erosivity of the tillage operations (β value). Output data from the model include tillage erosion rate and elevation change.
- The Tillage Translocation Model (TillTM) is used to simulate the tillage translocation process and to predict tillage-induced soil mass and soil constituent redistribution along a transect. It takes into account both the vertical and horizontal mixing of soil during the tillage translocation process.

=== Field scale model (two-dimensional) ===
- The Water and Tillage Erosion Model (WaTEM) is a model designed to calculate both water and tillage erosion rate at each grid node in Digital Elevation Model (DEM). The tillage erosion component of WaTEM simulates the soil redistribution in DEM using a diffusion-type equation and assumes that all soil translocation occurs in the direction of steepest slope, irrespective of the pattern of tillage.
- The Soil Redistribution by Tillage (SORET) model is of the spatial distribution type and can perform 3D simulations of soil redistribution in DEMs on the field scale. It can predict soil redistribution arising from different patterns of tillage in a given landscape via computer simulation of a single tillage operation, and is also able to forecast the long-term effects of repeated operations. It takes into account the tillage pattern (directions) and can calculate tillage translocation in the directions parallel and perpendicular to the direction of tillage.
- The Tillage Erosion Model (TillEM) calculates point-tillage-erosion rates on grid nodes of a DEM along the lines both parallel and perpendicular to the direction of tillage, representing forward and lateral tillage translocation, which is very similar to the SORET model. The difference is that the TillEM takes into account the effects of slope curvature variations (γ value) on tillage translocation.
- The Directional Tillage Erosion Model (DirTillEM) is an upgraded version of TillEM. The DirTillEM calculates the incoming and outgoing soil in each of the four directions for each cell in a DEM and determines the tillage erosion for that cell by summing up all incoming and outgoing soil. This calculation structure allows the DirTillEM to treat each cell independently so that it can simulate tillage erosion under complicated tillage patterns (e.g., circular pattern) or irregular field boundaries.
- The Cellular Automata model for Tillage Translocation (CATT) simulates soil redistribution in a field caused by tillage via a Cellular Automata Model which sequentially calculates the local interactions between a cell and its neighbours due to tillage translocation.

== Effects ==
=== Soil degradation ===
Tillage erosion causes loss of fertile top soil from the eroding portion of the field. As the top soil layer is getting thinner, subsequent tillage operations will bring up sublayer soil and mix it into the tillage layer. This vertical mixing results in soil degradation in the eroding portion of the field. Moreover, the degraded soil in the eroding portion of the field will be horizontally mixed into adjacent areas through tillage translocation. Over time, with the vertical and horizontal mixing, tillage translocation will cause the spread the subsoil from the eroding portion to over the entire field, including areas of tillage accumulation.

=== Loss of crop productivity ===
Subsoil often has undesirable soil properties for crop growth (e.g., less organic carbon, poor structure). When subsoil is mixed into the tillage layer due to tillage erosion, crop productivity will be negatively impacted. The loss due to such crop productivity loss is enormous given that the damage is long lasting and it takes great effort to restore the soil quality to its original level.

=== Environmental impact and greenhouse gas emissions ===
As soil is degraded due to tillage erosion, it can lead to some environmental issues such as increased nutrient losses and GHG emissions. For carbon sequestration in particular, although degraded soil in the eroding portion may reduce carbon sequestration, the burial of top soil in the soil accumulation regions create a large sink for carbon sequestration.

=== Landform evolution and creation of topographic features ===
Tillage erosion is a dominant process for landform evolution in many agricultural fields. It flattens convexities and concavities and creates tillage walls and banks along field boundaries With a consistent pattern, it can even create topographic features in flat fields. For example, when a one way throw tillage equipment (e.g., mouldboard plough) is used in a circular pattern over many years, it can create a “>--<” pattern ditch in the middle of the field.

=== Linkages and interactions with other erosion processes ===
Cultivated fields are subject to not only tillage erosion but also water and wind erosion. There are linkages and interactions between these erosion processes. Linkages and interactions refer to the additive and non-additive effects, respectively, between different erosion processes. Total soil erosion may be increased or decreased due to positive and negative linkages, respectively, between different erosion processes. Interactions occur when one erosion process changes the erodibility of the landscape for another erosion process, or when one process works as a delivery mechanism for another erosion process. For example, soil degradation caused by tillage erosion likely will increase the erodibility of the soil to water and wind erosion. Another example is the interactions between tillage and water erosion around water eroded channels, especially ephemeral gullies. Tillage is often used to eliminate these channels and ephemeral gullies, in which tillage translocation essentially serves as a delivery mechanism to transport soil to areas most susceptible to water erosion.

== Mitigation ==
Tillage erosion can be mitigated by reducing the intensity of tillage. This includes reducing the frequency of tillage, the speed and depth of tillage, and the size of the tillage implement. However, conservation tillage equipment designed to reduce water erosion may not be able to reduce tillage erosion and field operations traditionally not considered tillage operations may cause significant amount of tillage erosion (e.g., harvesting for potato). Contour tillage will reduce the variation of tillage speed and depth, resulting in reduced changes in tillage translocation across the field. This will also lead to lower tillage erosion. In addition, downslope movement of soil can be compensated by using a reversible moldboard plough to throw the furrow upslope. Physically moving soil from accumulation areas (e.g., depressions) to the eroding portion of the field (e.g., hilltops), a practice termed soil landscape restoration, can mitigate the impact of tillage erosion by restoring soil productivity at the eroding portion of the field.
