= Levee breach =

Situation where a levee containing water is breached

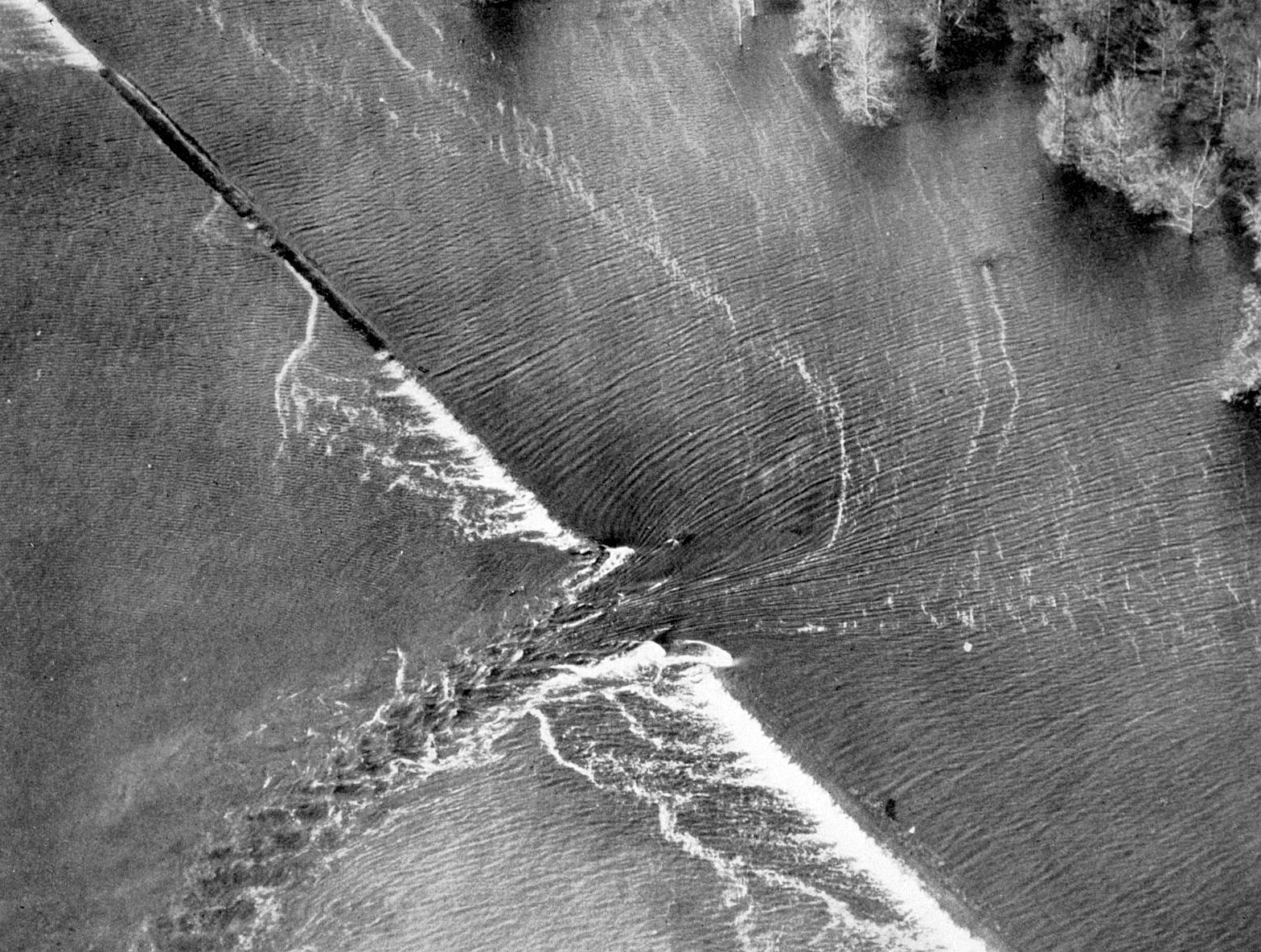
A levee failure during the Great Mississippi Flood of 1927.

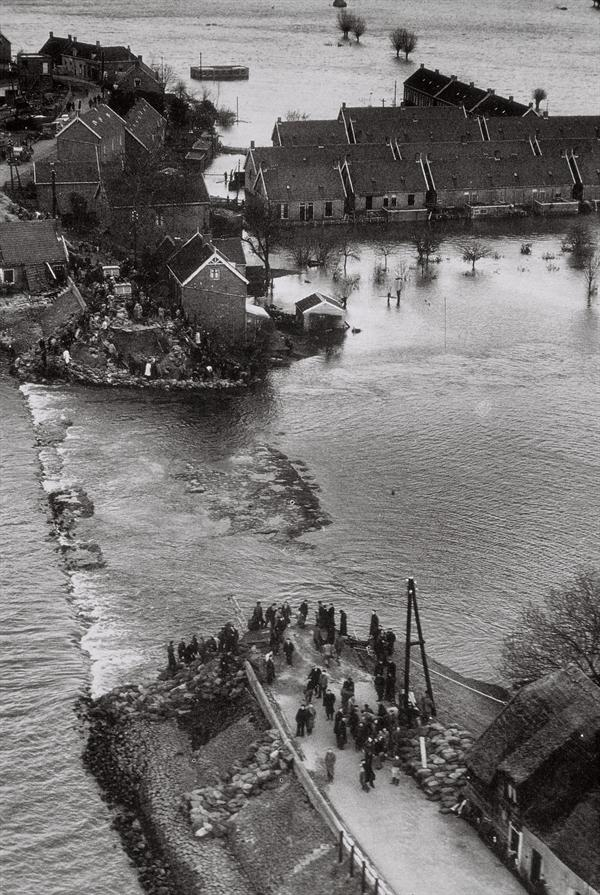
A breach in a dike during the North Sea flood of 1953.

A levee breach or levee failure (also known as dyke breach or dyke failure) is a situation where a levee (or dyke) fails or is intentionally breached, causing the previously contained water to flood the land behind the levee.

== Causes ==
Man-made levees can fail in a number of ways. The most frequent (and dangerous) form of levee failure is a breach. A levee breach is when part of the levee actually breaks away, leaving a large opening for water to flood the land protected by the levee.

=== Foundation failure ===
A breach can be a sudden or gradual failure that is caused either by surface erosion or by a subsurface failure of the levee. Levee breaches are often accompanied by levee boils, or sand boils. The underseepage resurfaces on the landside, in the form of a volcano-like cone of sand. Boils signal a condition of incipient instability which may lead to erosion of the levee toe or foundation or result in sinking of the levee into the liquefied foundation below. Some engineers think that boils lead to a form of internal erosion called piping which undermines the levee, but others consider them a symptom of generalized instability of the foundation.

=== Erosion and damage ===
Surface erosion of the surface of a levee is usually caused by the action of wind and water (waves but also normal flow). Erosion can be worsened by pre-existing or new damage to a levee. Areas with no surface protection are more prone to erosion. A levee grazed by certain types of animals, like sheep, can show trails used by the animals where grass does not grow.

Trees in levees are a special risk. A tree can become unstable after the soil of the levee has become saturated with water. When the tree falls the root system will likely take a chunk of the saturated soil out of the levee. This shallow hole can quickly erode and result in a breach. If the tree falls in the water and floats away it can damage the levee further downstream. Floating trees near levees should be quickly removed by the agency responsible for the maintenance of the levee.

Other forms of damage can be caused by ships or other (large) floating objects or from objects in the levee, like traffic signs or fences that are damaged or completely removed by wind or water. Barbed wire fences can collect large amounts of floating plant material, resulting in a large amount of drag from the water. Whole fences can be dragged away by the water.

=== Overtopping ===
Sometimes levees are said to fail when water overtops the crest of the levee. Levee overtopping can be caused when flood waters simply exceed the lowest crest of the levee system or if high winds begin to generate significant swells (a storm surge) in the ocean or river water to bring waves crashing over the levee. Overtopping can lead to significant landside erosion of the levee or even be the mechanism for complete breach. Often levees are armored or reinforced with rocks or concrete to prevent erosion and failure.

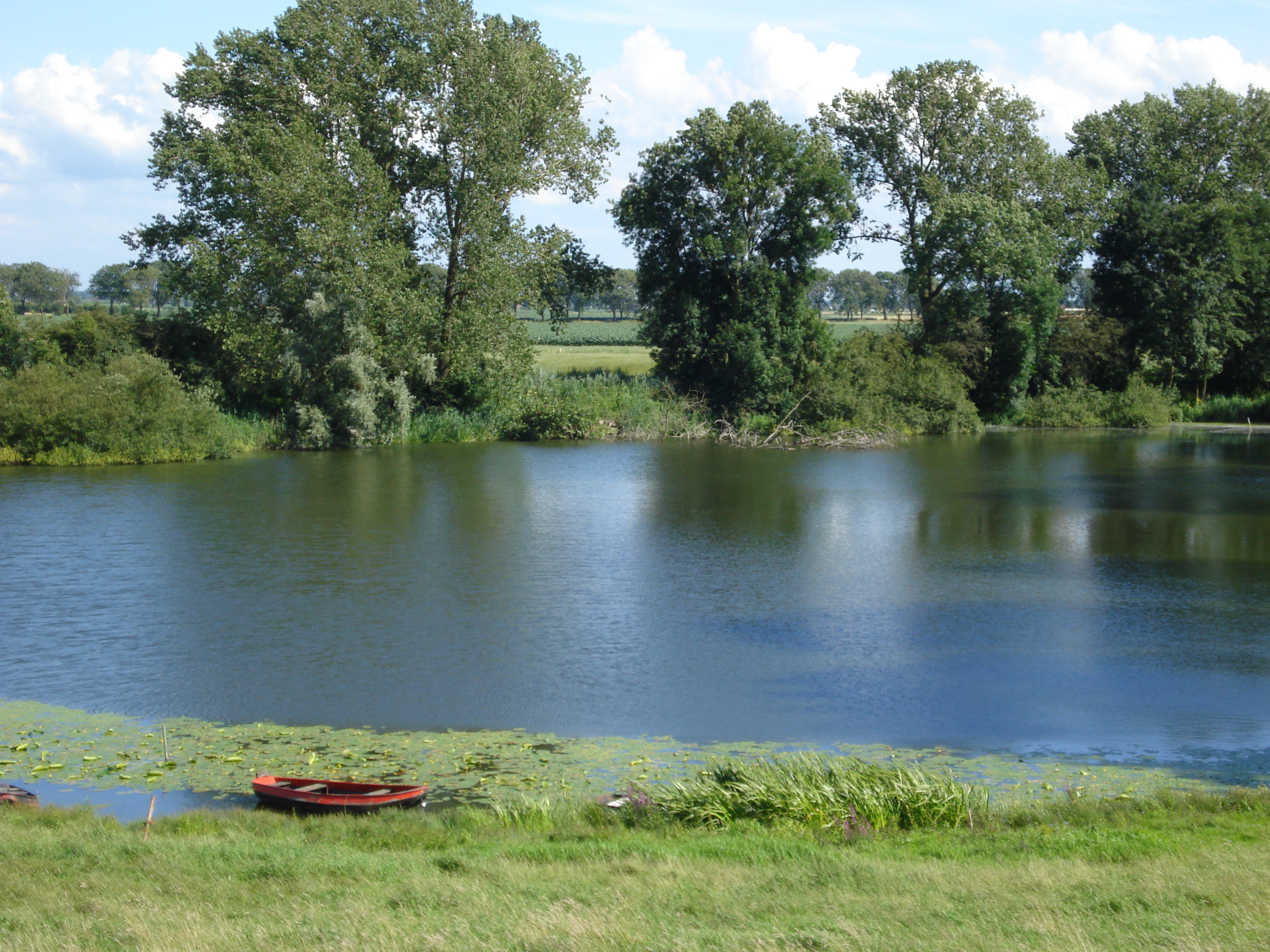
A kolk lake in the Netherlands

== Kolk lakes ==
After a levee breach a kolk lake can often be seen. This is a crater-like depression just behind the breach where soil and other material has been violently scoured out by the rushing water. After a breach, a kolk lake can sometimes remain after the water level recedes.

== Intentional breaches ==
In some cases levees are breached intentionally. This can be done to protect other areas, to drain flooded areas, or to give back land to nature. In most cases an intentional breach is not without discussion since valuable land is given up.

During the Great Mississippi Flood of 1927 a levee was blown up with dynamite to prevent the flooding of New Orleans. Again during record-breaking flooding in 2011, the US Army Corps of Engineers blew up a section of a Mississippi River levee with dynamite to open the New Madrid Floodway. The floodway was used for farming and had about 200 residents at the time. The levee at Bird's Point was designed to be removed if necessary so that Mississippi water levels would be lowered, taking pressure off levees for miles upstream in more populated areas such as Cairo, Illinois, and New Madrid, Missouri.

Taking land from the cycle of flooding by putting a dike around it prevents it from being raised by silt left behind after a flood. At the same time the drained soil consolidates and peat decomposes leading to land subsidence. In this way the difference between the water level on one side and land level on the other side of the dike grows.

In some areas reclaimed land is given back to nature by breaching and removing dikes to allow flooding to occur (again). This restores the natural environment in the area. This happened in the Glory River in Iraq.

== Examples ==
=== New Orleans ===
The words levee and levee breach were brought heavily into the public consciousness after the levee failures in metro New Orleans on August 29, 2005, when Hurricane Katrina passed east of the city. Levees breached in over 50 different places submerging 80 percent of the city. Most levees failed due to water overtopping them but some failed when water passed underneath the levee foundations causing the levee wall to shift and resulting in catastrophic sudden breaching. The sudden breaching released water at a high velocity that moved houses off their foundations and tossed cars into trees. This happened in the Lower Ninth Ward when the Industrial Canal breached and also in the Lakeview neighborhood when the 17th Street Canal breached. At least 1,464 people perished. In New Orleans, the United States Army Corps of Engineers is the Federal agency responsible for levee design and construction as defined in the Flood Control Act of 1965 and subject to local participation requirements, some of which were later waived. Fault has been aimed at the Corps of Engineers, their local contractors, and local levee boards.

=== North Sea ===
The St. Elizabeth's flood of 1421 was caused by a surge of seawater being forced upriver during a storm, overflowing the river dikes and submerging approximately 300 square kilometres (100 sq mi) of land in the Netherlands. Estimates of people having died range from 2,000 to 10,000. Parts of the submerged lands have still not been reclaimed resulting in the Biesbosch wetlands.

During the North Sea flood of 1953, in the night of 31 January – 1 February 1953, many dikes in the provinces of Zeeland, South Holland and North Brabant in the Netherlands were unable to withstand the combination of spring tide and a northwesterly storm. The resulting flood killed 1,835 people. A further 307 people were killed by dike breaches in the United Kingdom, in the counties of Lincolnshire, Norfolk, Suffolk and Essex. In the Netherlands this flood was a main reason for the construction of the Delta Works, probably the most innovative and extensive levee system in the world.

=== Other breaches ===
- 1421 – The St. Elizabeth's flood of 1421 in the Netherlands was caused when dikes were breached in a number of places during a heavy storm near the North Sea coast and the lower lying polder land was flooded. A number of villages were swallowed by the flood and were lost, causing between 2,000 and 10,000 casualties.
- 1570 – The All Saints' Flood caused dike breaches on the west coast of the Netherlands. The total number of dead, including in foreign countries, must have been above 20,000, but exact data is not available. Tens of thousands of people became homeless. Livestock was lost in huge numbers. Winter stocks of food and fodder were destroyed.
- 1651 – During the St. Peter's Flood the city of Amsterdam was flooded after several breaches of the dikes, the coasts of Netherlands and Northern Germany were heavily battered.
- 1686 – The St. Martin's flood flooded large parts of the province of Groningen in the Netherlands. 1558 people, 1387 horses and 7861 cows died. 631 houses were swept away and 616 houses damaged.
- 1703 – The Great Storm of 1703 caused havoc between Wales and Friesland, it was the most severe storm or natural disaster ever recorded in the southern part of Great Britain. Several dikes were breached in the Netherlands. Between 8,000 and 15,000 lives were lost overall.
- 1717 – The Christmas flood of 1717 was the result of a northwesterly storm, which hit the coast area of the Netherlands, Germany and Scandinavia on Christmas night of 1717. In total, approximately 14,000 people drowned. It was the last large flood in the north of the Netherlands.
- 1809 – When De Biesbosch in the Netherlands froze, ice dams caused a rapid rise in waterlevels in the Meuse, Waal and Merwede, which resulted in dike breaches.
- 1820 – The Alblasserwaard in the Netherlands flooded after a dike breach
- 1825 – Parts of Groningen, Friesland and Overijssel in the Netherlands were flooded after dike breaches
- 1855 – Large parts of the central Netherlands were flooded after the Lower Rhine was dammed by ice and dikes were breached
- 1916 – A storm surge on the Zuiderzee coincided with a large volume of water flowing down the Rhine and Meuse rivers causing dozens of dike breaches
- 1927 – The Great Mississippi Flood of 1927 occurred when the Mississippi River breached levees and flooded 27,000 square miles (70,000 km^{2}), killing 246 people in seven states and displacing 700,000 people.
- September 1928: Storm surge from the Okeechobee Hurricane breaches levees surrounding Lake Okeechobee, killing an estimated 2500 people.
- 1938 Yellow River flood, voluntary destruction during the Second Sino-Japanese War, around 500,000 deaths.
- 3 October 1944 – Inundation of Walcheren, deliberate military flooding by the Allies using air-dropped bombs
- 17 April 1945 – Inundation of the Wieringermeer, military flooding, to cover the retreat of the German army
- Dec 24, 1955 – Just after midnight, a levee on the west bank of the Feather River collapsed just south of Yuba City, Ca., resulting in the drowning of 38 residents.
- Jan 3, 1976 – A dike failed on the Vliet, a tributary of the Rupel in Belgium. The village of Ruisbroek was flooded to a depth of 3m and over 2000 people had to be evacuated. This disaster prompted the drafting of Belgium's Sigma Plan as a counterpart to the Dutch Delta Plan.
- Feb 20, 1986 – A levee on the south bank of the Yuba River collapsed at the northern Sacramento Valley community of Linda, California in Yuba County, inundating more than 4,000 homes and displacing more than 24,000 residents.
- Jan 31, 1995 – 250,000 people were evacuated from central parts of the Netherlands after river dikes had become dangerously unstable. The dikes were not breached after intensive works to stabilize the embankments, aided by military engineers.
- Jan 2, 1997 – A levee on the east bank of the Feather River collapsed at the northern Sacramento Valley community of Arboga, California in Yuba County, killing three people. More than 100,000 people in Yuba and Sutter counties were evacuated.
- 26 Aug 2003 – A dike near Wilnis in the Netherlands failed and flooded that town due to the dike not having enough weight to withstand the water pressure of the canal after a long drought. 1,500 inhabitants were evacuated with no loss of life.
- 3 June 2004 – Jones Tract, an inland island that is protected by a series of levees located in the Sacramento-San Joaquin Delta, failed.
- January 5, 2008 – A levee in Fernley, Nevada burst, flooding portions of the town and forcing the evacuations of 3,500 residents.
- September 14, 2008 – a levee in Munster, Indiana broke on the Little Calumet River resulting in flooding in most of Munster.
- August 8, 2009 – Levees fail in Southern Taiwan due to Typhoon Morakot causing widespread flooding in many regions.
- February 26, 2010 – Levees were submerged by wind and a huge tide in Vendée, in Western France because of the Xynthia storm.
- April 26, 2011 – A levee on the Black River in Poplar Bluff, Missouri failed, sending water rushing into rural Butler County, Missouri.
