= Internal erosion =

Catastrophic channeling in earth dams caused by water flow

Internal erosion is the formation of voids within a soil caused by the removal of material by seepage. It is the second most common cause of failure in levees and one of the leading causes of failures in earth dams, responsible for about half of embankment dam failures.

Internal erosion occurs when the hydraulic forces exerted by water seeping through the pores and cracks of the material in the dam and/or foundation are sufficient to detach particles and transport them out of the dam structure. Internal erosion is especially dangerous because there may be no external evidence, or only subtle evidence, that it is taking place. Usually a sand boil can be found, but the boil might be hidden under water. A dam may breach within a few hours after evidence of internal erosion becomes obvious.

Piping is a related phenomenon and is defined as the progressive development of internal erosion by seepage, appearing downstream as a hole discharging water. Piping is induced by regressive erosion of particles from downstream and along the upstream line towards an outside environment until a continuous pipe is formed.

== Internal erosion and the piping process ==
According to the International Commission on Large Dams (ICOLD), there are four general failure modes for internal erosion of embankment dams and their foundations:

- Through the embankment
- Through the foundation
- Embankment-into-foundation
- Associated with through-penetrating structures

The process of internal erosion occurs across four phases: initiation of erosion, progression to form a pipe, surface instability, and, lastly, initiation of a breach. Internal erosion is also classified in four types, dependent on failure path, how the erosion initiates and progresses, and its location:

- Concentrated leak: seeping water erodes and enlarges a crack until a breach occurs. The crack may not progress to the exit (albeit failure is still possible), but eventually the continued erosion forms a pipe or a sinkhole.
- Backward erosion: initiated at the exit point of the seepage path, this type of erosion occurs when the hydraulic gradient is sufficiently high to cause particle detachment and transport; a pipe forms backwards from the exit point until breach.
- Suffusion: occurs in soils with a wide range of particle sizes. Finer soil particles are eroded through the voids between coarser particles. Soils susceptible to suffusion are termed internally unstable. Suffusion can only occur if the volume occupied by the finer particles is lower than the available void space between the coarse particles.
- Soil contact erosion: a phenomenon called sheet flow occurs at interfaces between coarse and fine soils. Water seeps along the interface between the two soils, eroding the particles from the finer layer into the coarser layer.

=== Concentrated leak ===
Concentrated leaks occur when cracks form in the soil. The cracks must be below reservoir level, and water pressure needs to be present to maintain the open pipe. It is possible for water flow to cause the sides of the pipe to swell, closing it and thus limiting erosion. Additionally, if the soil lacks sufficient cohesion to maintain a crack, the crack will collapse and concentrated leak erosion will not progress to a breach. Cracks that allow concentrated leaks can arise due to many factors, including:

- Cross-valley arching resulting in vertical stresses on the sides of the dam
- Core arching on the shoulders of the embankment
- Differential settlement (above 0.2% differential, a crack forming is almost certain)
- Small scale irregularities during core treatment (e.g. due to poor compaction)
- Cracks and gaps adjacent to spillways or abutment walls or around conduits
- Various environmental factors like desiccation, settlement during earthquakes, freezing, animal burrows, vegetation/roots.

Longitudinal cracks arise from the spreading of the embankment, while transverse openings, which are much more common, are due to vertical settlement of the dam. The critical hydraulic shear stress τ_{c} required for the initiation of concentrated leak erosion can be estimated using laboratory testing, such as the hole erosion test (HET) or the jet erosion test (JET).

=== Backward erosion ===
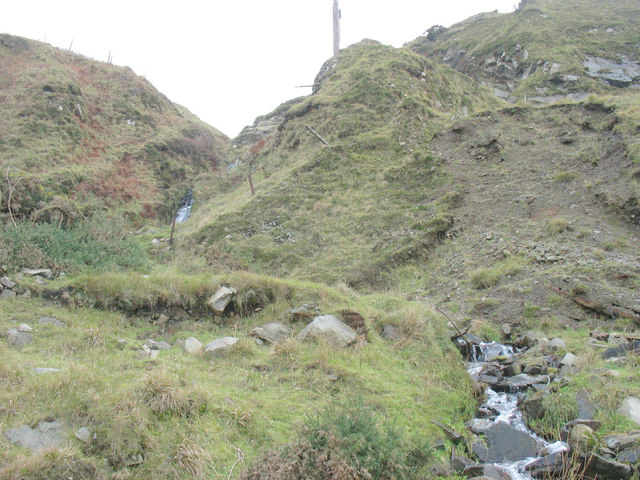
This hanging valley has been created by the rapid backward erosion of the boulder clay cliffs.

Backward erosion often occurs in non-plastic soils such as fine sands. It can occur in sandy foundations, within the dam or levee, or in cofferdams under high flood pressures during construction, causing unraveling at the downstream face. It also occurs in landslide and flood-prone regions where slopes have been disturbed.

Backward erosion is most often exhibited by the presence of sand boils at the downstream side of dams. Experiments from Sellmeijer and co-workers have shown that backwards erosion initiates in a slot through the strata that overlays the eroding soil (e.g. through excavations or drainage ditches) and then progress in many, smaller pipes (less than 2mm in height) rather than a single one. The stability of the pipes is dependent on the head, and once this is larger than a critical value (0.3-0.5 of flow path length), the channel extends upstream. Beyond this, at any head greater than the critical value, erosion progresses until eventually, the pipes break through to the upstream reservoir, at which point a breach occurs. In order for backward erosion to occur, the dam or levee body must form and maintain a ‘roof’ for the pipe.

=== Suffusion ===
Suffusion occurs when water flows through widely-graded or gap-graded, cohesionless soils. The finer particles are transported by seepage, and the coarse particles carry most of the effective stress. Suffusion can only occur provided the fine soil particles are small enough to pass between the coarse particles and do not fill the voids in the coarser soil. Water flow velocity must also be sufficient to transport those fine particles.

Suffusion leads to increased permeability in the embankment core, greater seepage velocities and possibly hydraulic fractures. It can also lead to settlement if it occurs in the dam foundation. Soils subject to suffusion also tend to be affected by segregation. The Kenney-Lau approach is a renowned method for the analysis of suffusion, which uses the particle size distribution to assess the internal stability of a soil, which directly affects the likelihood of suffusion occurring.

=== Soil contact erosion ===
Soil contact erosion occurs when sheet flow (water flow parallel to an interface) erodes fine soil in contact with coarse soil. Contact erosion is largely dependent on the flow velocity, which must be sufficient to detach and transport the finer particles, as well as the finer soil particles being able to pass through the pores in the coarse layer. When contact erosion is initiated, a cavity is formed, leading to a reduction of stress. The roof of the cavity then collapses; the collapsed material is transported away resulting in a larger cavity. The process continues until the formation of a sinkhole. It is possible for a cavity to not collapse; this will lead to backward erosion occurring.

Soil contact erosion can occur between any granular layer and a finer soil such as in silt-gravel, and often results in a loss of stability, increases in pore pressure and clogging of the permeable layer. Experimental results show that close to the geometrical limit, the point at which the fine particles can just pass between the coarse particles(the filter criterion), erosion initiation and failure are much more likely.

== Prevention using filters ==
It is possible to interrupt the process of internal erosion with the use of filters. Filters trap eroded particles while still allowing seepage, and are normally coarser and more permeable than the filtered soil. The type of filter required and its location is dependent on which zones of the dam are most susceptible to internal erosion. Per regulation, filters need to satisfy five conditions:

- Retention: the filter must limit or interrupt the transport of eroded soil particles.
- Self-filtration: also defined as stability, the filter must be internally stable.
- No cohesion: the filter must not have the ability to maintain cracks or the ability to cement.
- Drainage: the filter must be sufficiently permeable to allow water pressure to dissipate.
- Strength: the filter must be capable of transferring stresses within the dam without being crushed.
