= Hole erosion test =

Geotechnical engineering method used to quantify resistance of soil to erosion

The hole erosion test (HET) is a method used in geotechnical engineering to quantify the resistance of a soil to erosion, and is specifically relevant to the topic of internal erosion in embankment dams. The test can be performed in a laboratory on a remolded soil sample, and provides estimates of both the critical shear stress for erosion of the soil sample as well as a numerical measure of soil erodibility. In the design and engineering of embankment dams, the critical shear stress provided by this test indicates the maximum shear stress that a fluid (such as water) can apply to a soil before a concentrated leak forms and erosion begins. The numerical measure of soil erodibility can be used to predict how quickly this erosion will progress, and it can be found as an input in various computer simulations for dam failure.

== Procedure ==
The standard hole erosion test consists of first compacting the soil sample in a standard mold. Then, a small hole (typically 6 mm) is drilled lengthwise through the soil. Next, the downstream hydraulic head is set to a standard value, and the initial upstream hydraulic head is chosen using trial-and-error. As the liquid (typically water) flows through the hole, the soil should erode and the hole will expand. The flow rate should be measured throughout the procedure. Directly after the test, the diameter of the hole should be measured.

The hydraulic shear stress along the surface of the hole at time t can be calculated as:

$\tau = \rho g \frac{\Delta h}{L} \frac{\Phi_t}{4}$

where ρ is the density of the liquid, g is the gravitational acceleration, Δh is the difference in hydraulic head across the sample, L is the length of the sample, and Φ_{t} is the diameter of the hole at time t.

While the diameter of the hole is not directly measured throughout the test, it can be estimated using the measured flow rate as well as an estimated friction factor. From the change in diameter of the hole over time, the rate of erosion can thus be plotted against applied hydraulic shear stress and fit to the following equation:

$E_r = k_d(\tau - \tau_c)$

where E_{r} is the rate of erosion over time, k_{d} is the soil erodibility, and τ_{c} is the critical shear stress for erosion.

== Modified hole erosion test (HET-P) ==
One criticism of the standard hole erosion test is that the use of the hydraulic head rather than the total head implies that the change in velocity head is negligible, which may not be a valid assumption given the sometimes high velocities downstream of the hole. The difference in hydraulic head used to calculate the shear stress also does not factor in the energy dissipated due to flow recirculation and expansion losses downstream of the test specimen. Furthermore, estimating the diameter of the hole throughout the test using an assumed friction factor has been reported as problematic.

The modified hole erosion test (HET-P) seeks to rectify these issues with the addition of a pitot-static tube. This allows for the direct measurement of total hydraulic head, thus accounting for the total energy loss between the upstream and downstream ends of the soil sample. While the diameter of the hole is still not measured directly throughout the test, the pitot-static tube provides an independent estimate of the mean flow velocity, which can then be used to calculate the diameter of the hole more directly using the continuity equation.

The modified hole erosion test results in significantly smaller values for the critical shear stress - this is makes the results of the test more consistent with other tests, such as the Rotating Cylinder Test or the Jet Erosion Test.
