= Sand boil =

Cone formed by the ejection of sand on a surface from a central point

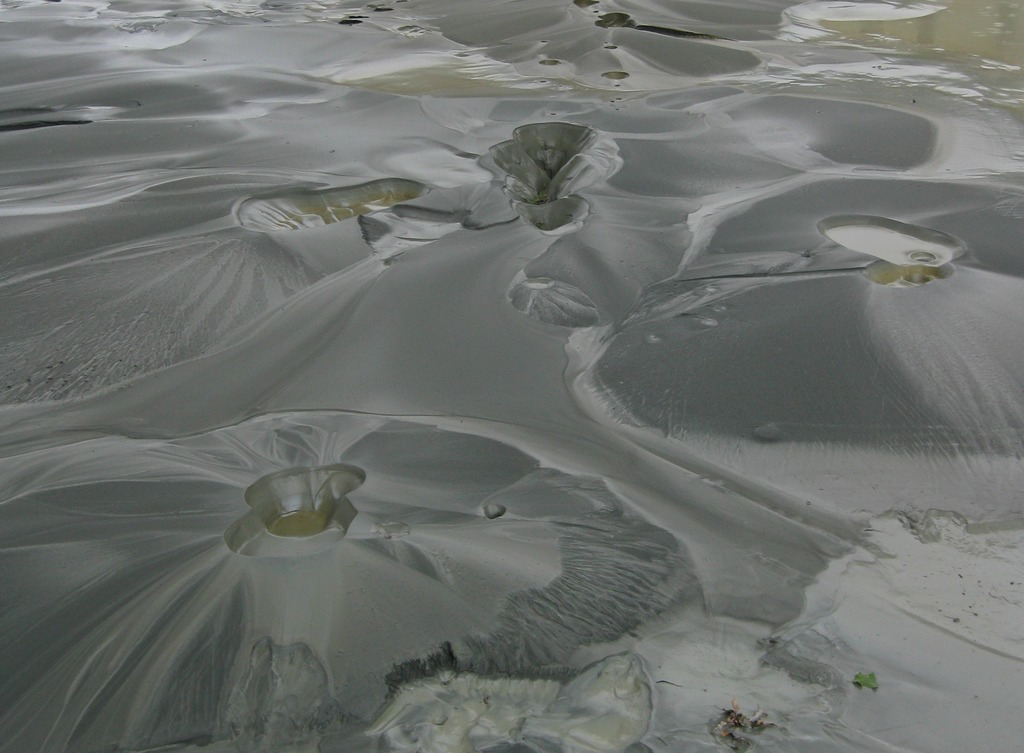
Sand boils that erupted during the 2011 Canterbury earthquake.

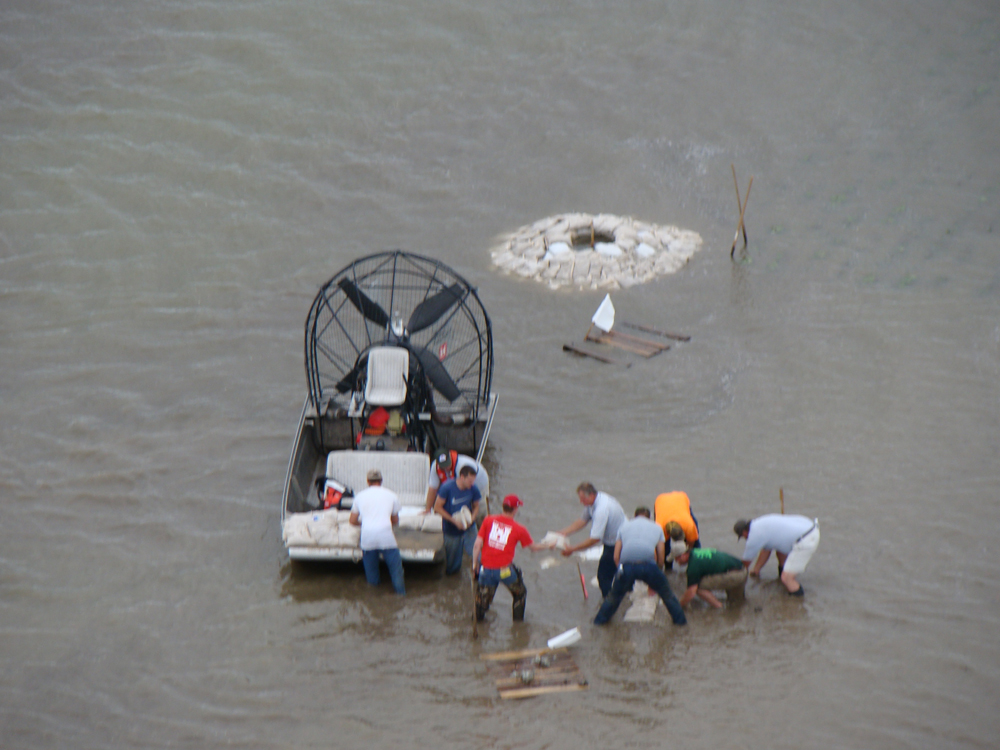
Attempts to plug a sand boil with sandbags during the 2011 Missouri River floods. Many of the attempts were unsuccessful.

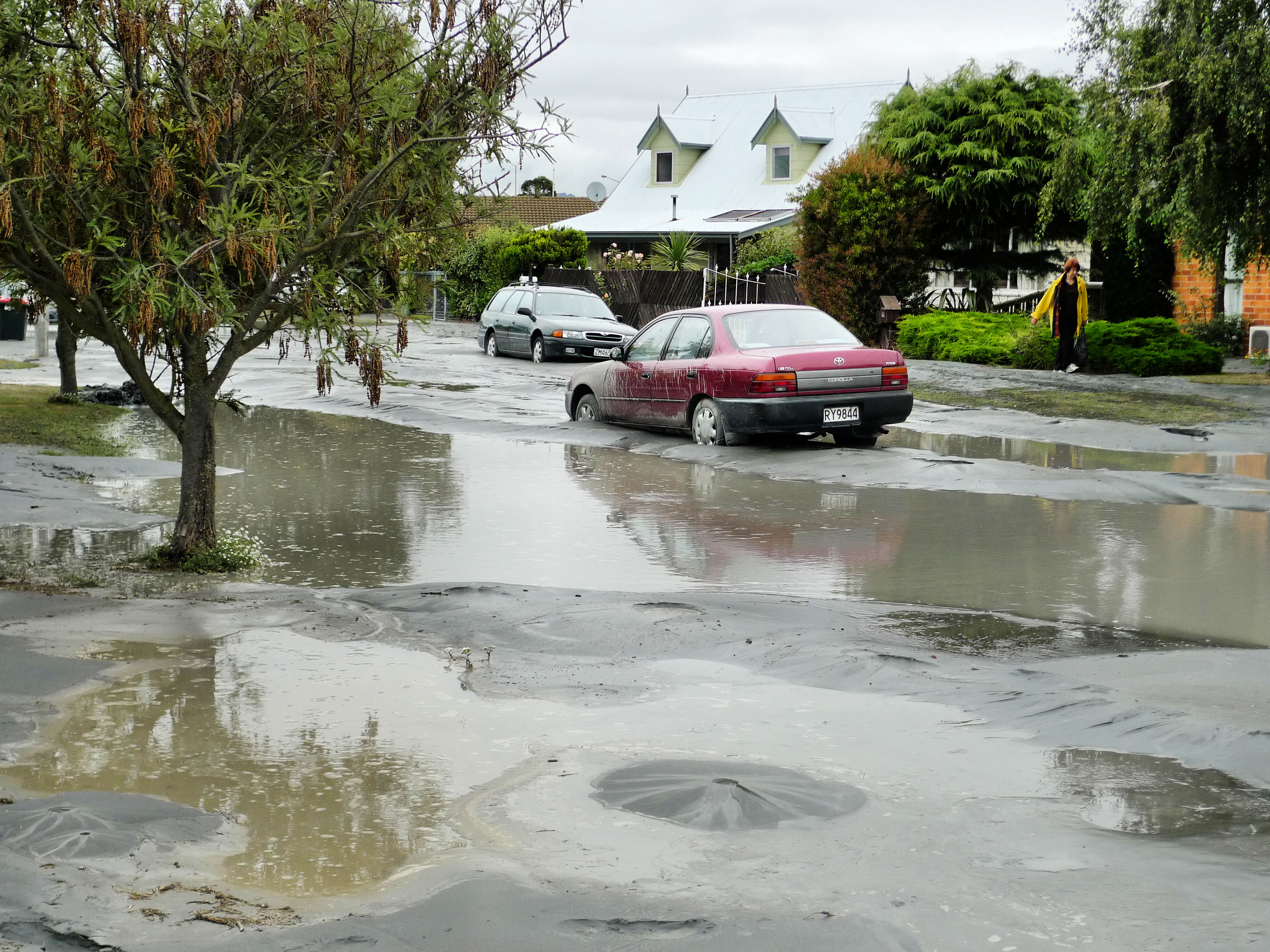
Sand boils and a silt-covered street after the 2011 Canterbury earthquake.

Sand or mud boils occur when water under pressure wells up through a bed of sand or dirt. The water looks like it is boiling up from the bed, hence the name. While many boils are temporary and form in response to natural phenomena such as earthquakes, the Tully Valley in central New York has consistently experienced mud boils since the late 1890s.

== Terminology ==
A number of terms are used to label the geological phenomenon, including sand boil, mud boil, sand volcano, mud volcano, sand blow, mud pot, sand springs, and hydrodynamic blowouts.

== Sand volcano ==
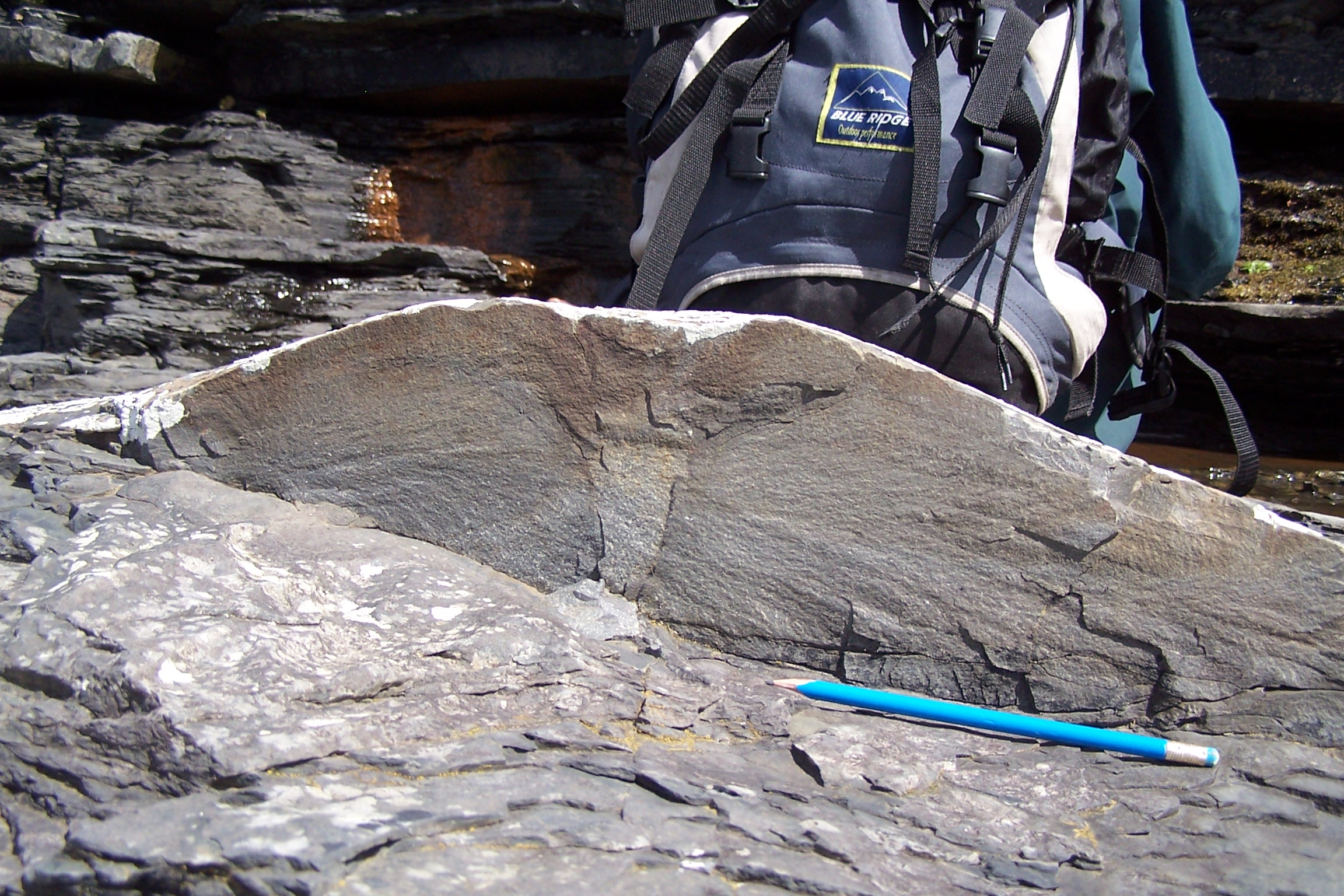
Cross section of a sand volcano in County Clare, Ireland

A sand volcano or sand blow is a cone of sand formed by the ejection of sand onto a surface from a central point. The sand builds up as a cone with slopes at the sand's angle of repose. A crater is commonly seen at the summit. The cone looks like a small volcanic cone and can range in size from millimetres to metres in diameter.

The process is often associated with soil liquefaction and the ejection of fluidized sand that can occur in water-saturated sediments during an earthquake. The New Madrid seismic zone exhibited many such features during the 1811–1812 New Madrid earthquakes. Adjacent sand blows aligned in a row along a linear fracture within fine-grained surface sediments are just as common, and can still be seen in the New Madrid area.

These earthquakes also caused the largest known sand boil in the world, which can still be found near Hayti, Missouri and is locally called "The Beach". It is 2.3 kilometers long and covers 55 hectares.

In the past few years, much effort has gone into the mapping of liquefaction features to study ancient earthquakes. The basic idea is to map zones that are susceptible to the process and then go in for a closer look. The presence or absence of soil liquefaction features, such as clastic dikes, is strong evidence of past earthquake activity, or lack thereof.

These are to be contrasted with mud volcanoes, which occur in areas of geyser or subsurface gas venting.

== Tully Valley ==
Mudboils are common in the Tully Valley in Onondaga County, in central New York State. They range from several inches to more than 30 feet in diameter, and ebb and flow dynamically: some will discharge large amounts of sediment over several days and then stop flowing, while others will flow continuously for multiple years. The phenomenon has been observed since the late 1890s.

The Tully Valley mudboils are associated with a history of brine extraction in the area, which began in the late 1880s. The halite beds in the Tully Valley lie under a 400-foot layer of glacial sediments and a 1000-foot layer of shale and limestone that separated them from the aquifer until salt extraction began. Brining has also caused ground subsidence in the areas above the salt beds.

Tons of sediment, as well as dissolved salt, are deposited by the mudboils into Onondaga Creek on a daily basis. Members of the Onondaga Nation report that as recently as the 1940s, the now-turbid water was clear and that tribe members used to swim and fish in the river.

== Flood protection structures ==
Sand boils can be a mechanism contributing to liquefaction and levee failure during floods. Boil refers to the visible "boiling" movement of coarse sand grains retained in the hole even as finer particles (silts and fine sands) are carried out and deposited on the apron around the boil hole. Sand boils are caused by hydraulic head in levee or dike pushing the water to seep out the other side, most likely during a flood. Sand boils start as simple seeps of laminar flow. With increasing head from rising flood waters, turbulent flow will initiate where the laminar flow leaves the soil to flow freely. Turbulent flow produces soil piping, whereby backward erosion results in a pipe-shaped cavity reaching back into the embankment, initiating at the seep and working through the embankment back to the water source. Once initiated, an unmitigated soil pipe can proceed quickly to embankment failure.

The flow in a sand boil can be slowed, but it is impractical to stop completely. The most effective response to an active sand boil is to stand water over the boil deep enough to reduce the hydraulic gradient and slow the water flow to eliminate turbulence and backward erosion at the head of the pipe. Slower, nonturbulent flow will not be able to move soil particles. The suppressing depth of water is created with sandbags forming a stacked ring around the boil.

During the flood of spring 2011, the United States Army Corps of Engineers had to work to contain the largest active sand boil ever discovered. The sand boil measured nine by 12 meters (30 by 40 feet) and was located in the city of Cairo, Illinois, at the confluence of the Mississippi River and the Ohio River.

== Earthquakes ==
An example of this is during the 1989 Loma Prieta earthquake in San Francisco, when sand boils brought up debris from the 1906 earthquake. This process is a result of liquefaction. By mapping the location of sand boils that erupted in the Marina District during the 1989 Loma Prieta earthquake, scientists discovered the site of a lagoon that existed in 1906. The lagoon developed after the Fair's Seawall was constructed and, in preparation for the Panama–Pacific International Exposition in 1915, was filled in.

== See also ==
- Internal erosion
- Quicksand
- Seepage
