= Jet erosion test =

Geotechnical engineering method used to quantify resistance of soil to erosion

The jet erosion test (JET), or jet index test, is a method used in geotechnical engineering to quantify the resistance of a soil to erosion. The test can be applied in-situ after preparing a field site, or it can be applied in a laboratory on either an intact or a remolded soil sample. A quantitative measure of erodibility allows for the prediction of erosion, assisting with the design of structures such as vegetated channels, road embankments, dams, levees, and spillways.

== Procedure ==
The test consists of mounting a jet tube inside of an enclosed cylinder and releasing a turbulent downpour of water onto a soil specimen at a constant hydraulic head. If the shear stress applied by the jet stream exceeds the critical shear stress for erosion of the soil, the jet will erode soil particles, causing a scour hole to form. The depth of the scour hole is then measured at specified time intervals.

Fitting the measured erosion rate (E_{r}) to the following equation allows the estimation of the erodibility of the soil (k_{d}) and the critical shear stress (τ_{c}), provided that the applied shear stress (τ) is estimated precisely:

$E_r = k_d(\tau - \tau_c)$

As of 2017, there is no universally accepted methodology to determine the erodibility of a soil. While the jet erosion test provides one estimate for the erodibility, the underlying assumptions of the test have been criticized for various reasons. Other erosion testing methods may produce values for erodibility and critical shear stress inconsistent with this method. Additionally, depending on the method used to fit the results to the above equation, the predicted values of k_{d} for a given τ_{c} can be up to 100 times smaller or larger due to predictive uncertainty.

=== The jet erosion index ===
One of the results of the test is the jet erosion index (J_{i}), which can be correlated with the soil erodibility. Typically, the jet erosion index ranges from 0 to 0.03.

Typical values of the jet erosion index
| Erosion resistance | Jet erosion index (J_{i}) |
| High | ≤ 0.001 |
| Medium | ~0.01 |
| Low | ≥ 0.02 |

== Related tests ==
- Hole erosion test (HET)
- Contact erosion test (CET)
