= Soil stabilization =

Methods for changing soil for engineering purposes

Soil stabilization is a general term for any physical, chemical, mechanical, biological, or combined method of changing a natural soil to meet an engineering purpose. Improvements include increasing weight-bearing capabilities, tensile strength, and overall performance of unstable subsoils, sands, and waste materials in order to strengthen road pavements.

Some renewable technologies are enzymes, surfactants, biopolymers, synthetic polymers, co-polymer-based products, cross-linking styrene acrylic polymers, tree resins, ionic stabilizers, fiber reinforcement, calcium chloride, calcite, sodium chloride, magnesium chloride, and more. Some of these new stabilizing techniques create hydrophobic surfaces and mass that prevent road failure from water penetration or heavy frosts by inhibiting the ingress of water into the treated layer.

== Common methods ==
Recent research has explored the use of enzyme-based stabilizers as an environmentally friendly alternative to traditional chemical additives. Field studies have shown that enzyme-treated soils can improve the performance of forest roads by enhancing bonding between soil particles and reducing moisture sensitivity, contributing to more sustainable and cost-effective stabilization solutions. However, recent technology has increased the number of traditional additives used for soil stabilization purposes. Such non-traditional stabilizers include polymer-based products (e.g. cross-linking water-based styrene acrylic polymers that significantly improve the load-bearing capacity and tensile strength of treated soils), Copolymer-Based Products, fiber reinforcement, calcium chloride, and Sodium Chloride.

Traditionally and widely accepted types of soil stabilization techniques use products such as bitumen emulsions which can be used as binding agents for producing a road base. However, bitumen is not an environmentally friendly product and becomes brittle when it dries out. Portland cement has been used as an alternative to soil stabilization. However, this can often be an expensive component and not an environmentally friendly alternative. Cement fly ash, lime fly ash (separately, or with cement or lime), bitumen, tar, cement kiln dust (CKD), tree resin, and ionic stabilizers are all commonly used stabilizing agents. Other stabilization techniques include using on-site materials including subsoils, sands, mining waste, natural stone industry waste, and crushed construction waste to provide stable, dust-free local roads for complete dust control and soil stabilization.

Many environmentally friendly alternatives have essentially the same formula as soap powders, merely lubricating and realigning the soil with no effective binding property. Many of the new approaches rely on large amounts of clay with its inherent binding properties. Bitumen, tar emulsions, asphalt, cement, and lime can be used as binding agents for producing a road base.

The National Society of Professional Engineers (NSPE) has explored newer types of soil stabilization technology, looking for effective and non-harmful alternatives. One alternative utilizes new soil stabilization technology, a process based on cross-linking styrene acrylic polymer. Another alternative uses long crystals to create a closed cell formation that is impermeable to water, frost, acid, and salt.

Utilizing new soil stabilization technology, a process of cross-linking within the polymeric formulation can replace traditional road/house construction methods in an environmentally friendly and effective way.

Another soil stabilization method called the Deep Mixing Method is non-destructive and effective at improving load bearing capacity of weak or loose soil strata. This method uses a small, penny-sized injection probe and minimizes debris and is ideal for re-compaction and consolidation of weak soil strata, increasing and improving load-bearing capacity under structures, and the remediation of shallow and deep sinkhole problems. This is particularly efficient when there is a need to support deficient public and private infrastructure.

=== Mechanical stabilization ===
Soil can also be stabilized mechanically with stabilization geosynthetics; for example, geogrids or geocells, a 3D mechanical soil stabilization technique. Stabilization is achieved via the confinement of particle movement to improve the strength of the entire layer. Confinement in geogrids is by means of interlock between the aggregate and grid (and tensioned membrane), and in geocells, by cell wall confinement (hoop) stress on the aggregate.

Mechanical stabilization methods such as geocell confinement combined with geotextile separation have increasingly been used to improve the structural performance of gravel roads constructed on weak waterlogged subgrades. Full-scale field investigations on forest roads in Sweden have shown that geocell-reinforced sections can significantly increase bearing capacity and reduce permanent surface deformation under repeated traffic loading compared with conventional unreinforced road structures.

The study further demonstrated that locally sourced infill materials used within geocell systems may provide performance comparable to or better than imported crushed aggregates, indicating potential reductions in material demand, transport requirements, and environmental impact for low-volume road construction.

Research has also demonstrated that locally sourced infill materials used within geocell systems may provide comparable or improved structural performance relative to imported crushed aggregates, contributing to reduced material demand and potentially lower environmental impact in low-volume road construction.

Improved drainage techniques have also been used as a stabilization approach by reducing excess pore water and enhancing load-bearing capacity. Methods such as the use of stone mattresses have been shown to improve structural performance of unpaved and forest roads by facilitating drainage and distributing loads more effectively under traffic conditions.

=== Magnesium chloride ===
Water-absorbing magnesium chloride (deliquescent) attributes include

1. Absorbing water from the air at 32% relative humidity, almost independent of temperature
2. Treated roads can be regraded and re-compacted with less concern for losing moisture and density

However, limitations include

1. Minimum humidity level
2. Better suited for drier climates
3. Concentrated solutions become very corrosive,
4. Moisture attraction, thereby prolonging the active period for corrosion
5. High fines content in treated material may become slippery when wet
6. When less than 20% solution, it has performance effectiveness similar to water

The use of magnesium chloride on roads remains controversial. Advocates claim that it produces cleaner air, which leads to better health as fugitive dust can cause health problems in the young, elderly, and people with respiratory conditions; and greater safety through improved road conditions, including increased driver visibility and decreased risks caused by loose gravel, soft spots, road roughness, and flying rocks. It reduces foreign sediment in nearby surface waters (dust that settles in creeks and streams), helps prevent stunted crop growth caused by clogged pores in plants, and keeps vehicles and property clean.

Other studies show the use of salts for road deicing or dust suppressing can contribute substantial amounts of chloride ions to runoff from the surface of roads treated with the compounds. The salts MgCl_{2} (and CaCl_{2}) are very soluble in water and will dissociate. The salts, when used on road surfaces, will dissolve during wet weather and be transported into the groundwater through infiltration and/or runoff into surface water bodies. Groundwater infiltration can be a problem and the chloride ion in drinking water is considered a problem when concentrations exceed 250 mg/L. It is therefore regulated by the United States' EPA's drinking water standards. The chloride concentration in the groundwater or surface water depends on several factors including:

1. Application rate
2. Composition and type of soil
3. Type, intensity, and amount of precipitation
4. Road system drainage

In addition, the chloride concentration in the surface water also depends on the size or flow rate of the water body and the resulting dilution achieved. In a chloride concentration study carried out in Wisconsin during a winter de-icing period, runoff from roadside drainages was analyzed. All studies indicated that the chloride concentration increased as a result of de-icing activities, but the levels were still below the MCL of 250 mg/L set by the EPA. Nevertheless, the long-term effect of this exposure is not known.

Although the U.S. EPA has set the maximum chloride concentration in water for domestic use at 250 mg/L, animals can tolerate higher levels. At excessively high levels, chloride is said to affect the health of animals. As stated by the National Technical Advisory Committee to the Secretary of Interior (1968), "Salinity may have a two-fold effect on wildlife; a direct one affecting the body processes of the species involved and an indirect one altering the environment making living species perpetuation difficult or impossible." One major problem associated with the use of de-icing salt as far as wildlife is concerned is that wildlife is known to have "salt craving" and therefore are attracted to salted highways which can be a traffic hazard to both the animals and motorists.

Regarding the accumulation of chloride salts in roadside soils including the adverse effects on roadside plants and vegetation physiology and morphology, documentation dates back to the World War II era and consistently continues forward to present times. As far as plants and vegetation are concerned, the accumulation of salts in the soil adversely affects their physiology and morphology by increasing the osmotic pressure of the soil solution, altering the plant's mineral nutrition, and accumulating specific ions to toxic concentrations in the plants. (Regarding the intentional application of excessive salts, see Salting the Earth).

Road departments and private industry may apply liquid or powdered magnesium chloride to control dust and erosion on unimproved (dirt or gravel) roads and dusty job sites such as quarries because it is relatively inexpensive to purchase and apply. Its hygroscopy makes it absorb moisture from the air, limiting the number of smaller particles (silts and clays) that become airborne. The most significant benefit of applying dust control products is the reduction in gravel road maintenance costs. However, recent research and updates indicate biological toxicity in the environment in plants is an ongoing problem. Since 2001, truckers have complained about "killer chemicals" on roads and now some states are backing away from using salt products.

A small percentage of owners of indoor arenas (for example, for horse riding) may apply magnesium chloride to sand or other "footing" materials to control dust. Although magnesium chloride used in an equestrian (horse) arena environment is generally referred to as a dust suppressant it is technically more accurate to consider it as a water augmentation activity since its performance is based on absorbing moisture from the air and from whatever else comes in contact with it.

To control or mitigate dust, chlorides need moisture to work effectively so it works better in humid than in arid climates. As the humidity increases the chloride draws moisture out of the air to keep the surface damp and as humidity decreases it diffuses and releases moisture. These naturally occurring equilibrium changes also allow chlorides to also be used as a dehydrating agent including the drying out of and curing and preservation of hides.

As a road stabilizer, magnesium chloride binds gravel and clay particles to keep them from leaving the road. The water-absorbing (hygroscopic) characteristics of magnesium chloride prevent the road from drying out, which keeps gravel on the ground. The road remains continually "wet" as if a water truck had just sprayed the road.

== See also ==
- Cellular confinement
- Erosion control
- post-fire seeding Soil stabilization
- Land improvement
- Geopolymer
- Geotechnical engineering
- Mechanically stabilized earth
- Polymer soil stabilization
