= WEPP =

Predicting water erosion impacts using simulations

The Water Erosion Prediction Project (WEPP) model is a physically based erosion simulation model built on the fundamentals of hydrology, plant science, hydraulics, and erosion mechanics. The model was developed by an interagency team of scientists to replace the Universal Soil Loss Equation (USLE) and has been widely used in the United States and the world. WEPP requires four inputs, i.e., climate, topography, soil, and management (vegetation); and provides various types of outputs, including water balance (surface runoff, subsurface flow, and evapotranspiration), soil detachment and deposition at points along the slope, sediment delivery, and vegetation growth. The WEPP model has been improved continuously since its public delivery in 1995, and is applicable for a variety of areas (e.g., cropland, rangeland, forestry, fisheries, and surface coal mining).

== Capability and strength ==
WEPP is applicable for a wide range of geographic and land-use and management conditions, and capable of predicting spatial and temporal distributions of soil detachment and deposition on an event or continuous basis at both small (hillslopes, roads, small parcels) and large (watershed) scales. Hillslope applications of the model can simulate a single profile having various distributions of soil, vegetation, and plant/management conditions. In WEPP watershed applications, multiple hillslopes, channels, and impoundments can be linked together, and runoff and sediment yield from the entire catchment predicted. The model has been parameterized for a large number of soils across the U.S. and model performance has been assessed under a wide variety of land-use and management conditions. In addition, WEPP can generate long-term daily climatic data with CLIGEN, an auxiliary stochastic climate generator. The CLIGEN database contains weather statistics from more than 2,600 weather stations in the United States. The WEPP climate database is supplemented by the PRISM database, which further refines the climatic data based on longitude, latitude, and elevation. WEPP can provide daily runoff, subsurface flow, and sediment output categorized into five particle-size classes: primary clay, primary silt, small aggregates, large aggregates, and primary sand, allowing calculation of selective sediment transport, and enrichment of the fine sediment sizes.

== Recent improvement ==
Since its release in 1995, researchers have made several improvements to the WEPP model. These include improved algorithms to simulate the effect of hydraulic structures and impoundments on runoff and sediment delivery, the addition of Penman–Monteith ET algorithms, subsurface converging lateral flow to represent variable source area runoff, improved canopy biomass routines for forested applications, and the incorporation of an alternative, energy-balance-based winter hydrologic routine. A number of modern graphical user interface programs have also been created, to assist in easier application of WEPP. The main interface for the model is a standalone Windows application (downloadable via: https://www.ars.usda.gov/midwest-area/west-lafayette-in/national-soil-erosion-research/docs/wepp/research/), that allows a user to simulate hillslope profiles and small watersheds and have full control over all model inputs (Figure 1). Additionally, web-based interfaces allow rapid use of the model while accessing existing soil, climate, and management databases (Figure 2).

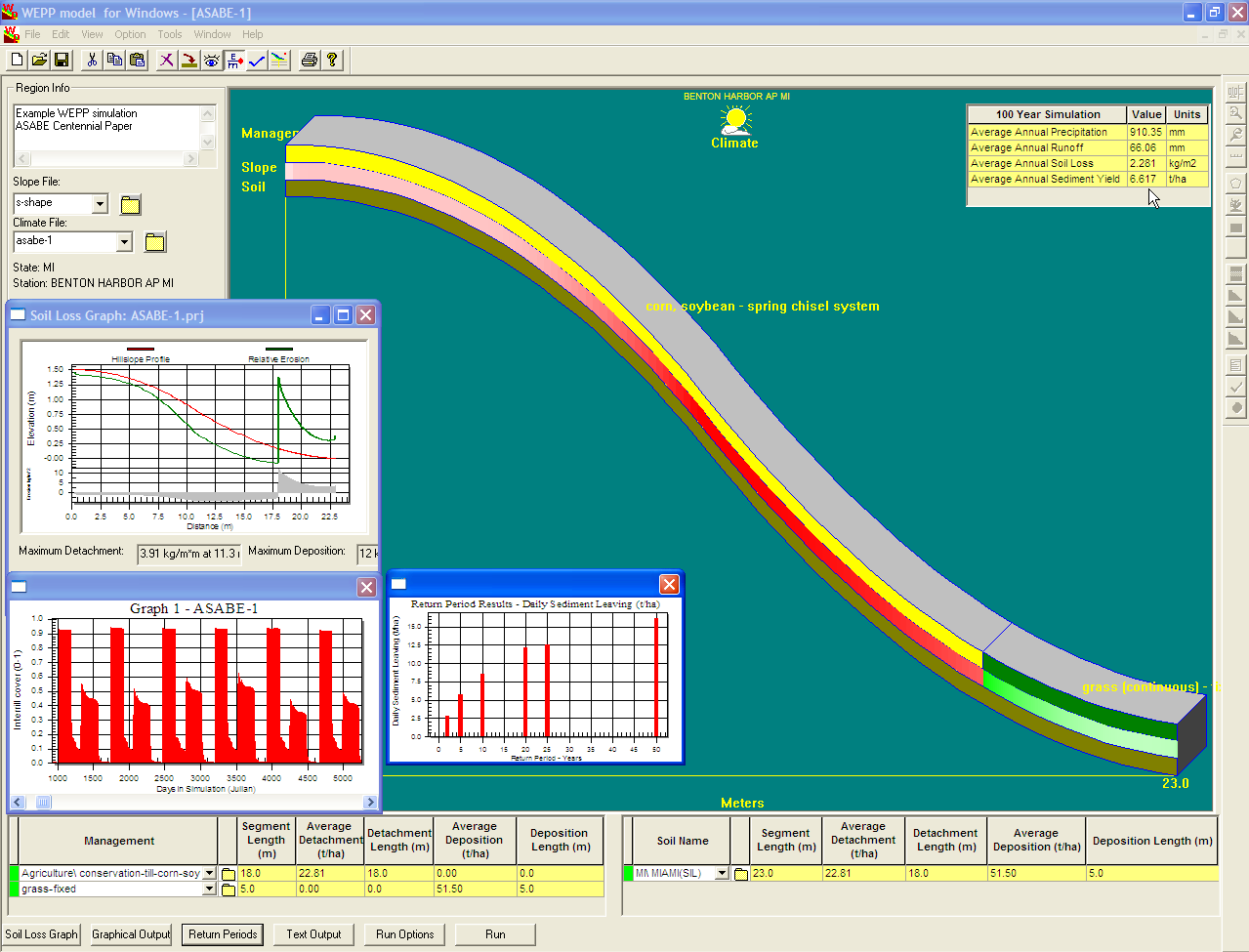
Figure 1. Screen capture of the WEPP Windows interface after completion of a 100-year hillslope simulation, showing text and graphical output results.

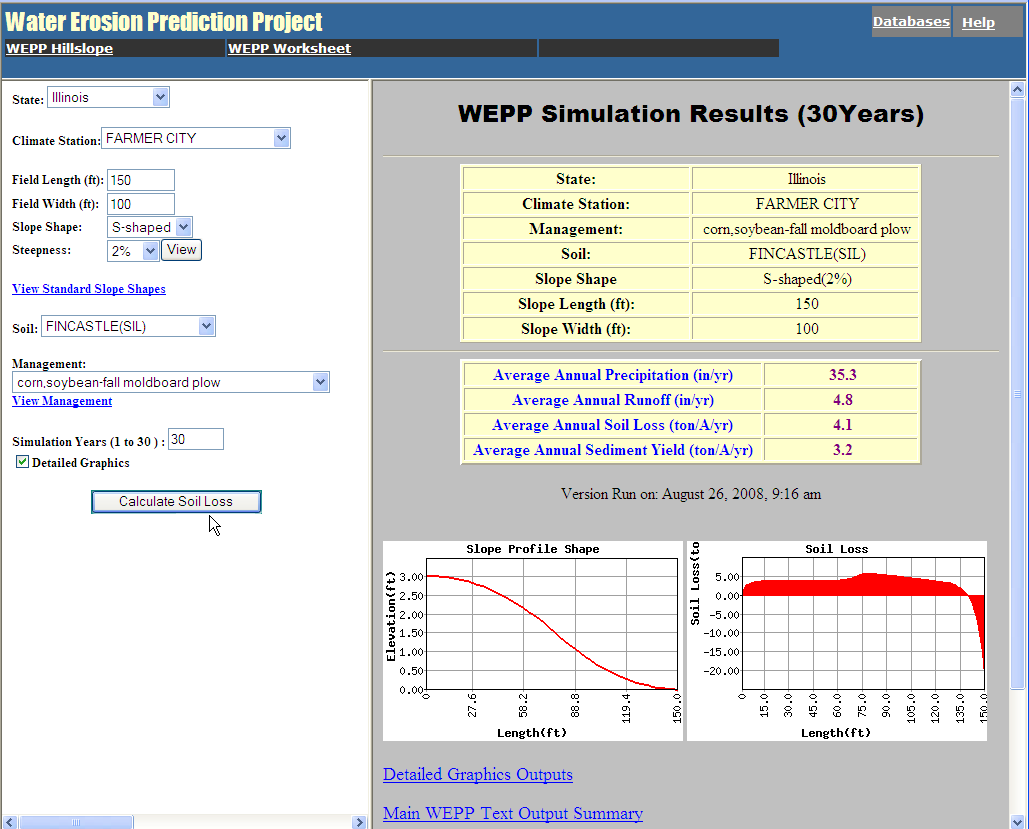
Figure 2. Screen capture of one of the WEPP web-based interfaces for simple hillslope profile simulations. Inputs for and results from a 30-year model run are shown.

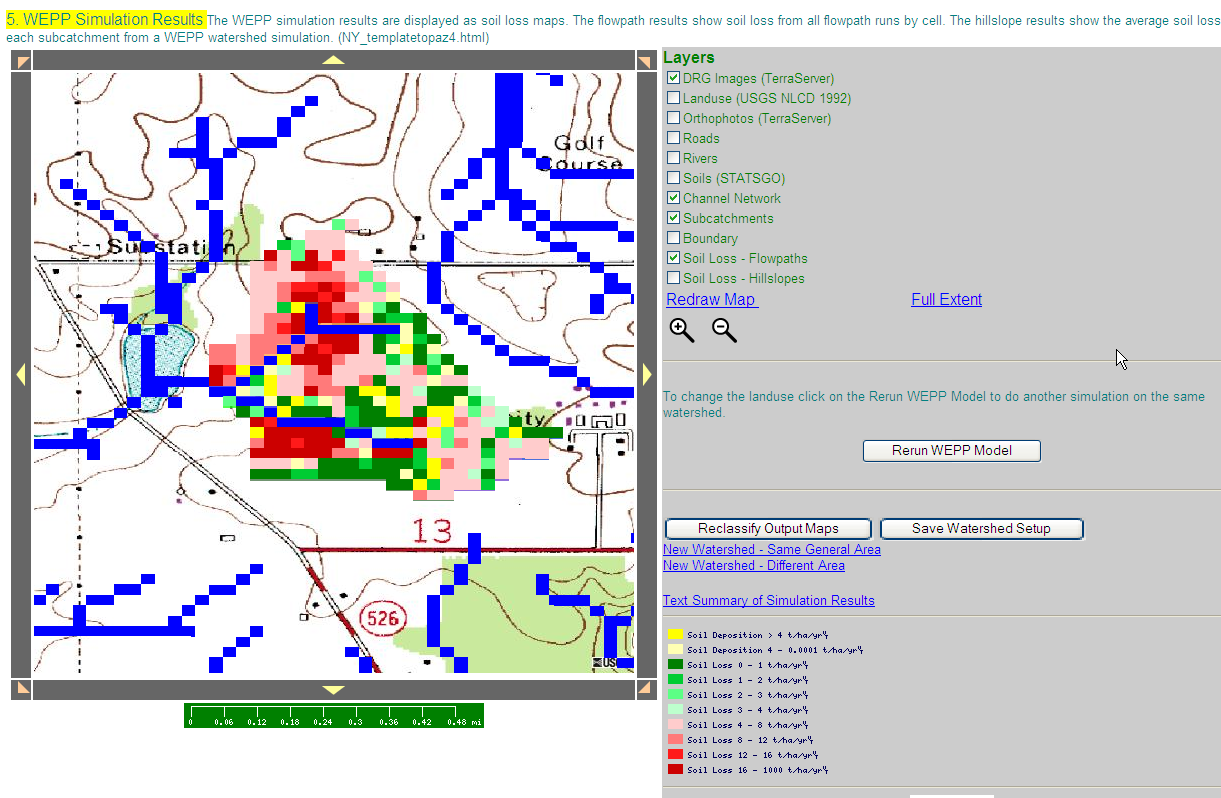
Figure 3. Screen capture of the WEPP web-based GIS interfaces for simple hillslope profile simulations. A small watershed with spatial soil erosion (red and green pixels) and deposition (yellow pixels) is shown.

A number of geospatial interfaces to WEPP (example in Figure 3) are also available:

1. GeoWEPP – an ArcView or ArcGIS extension that runs in conjunction with the WEPP Windows interface
2. On-line web-based GIS interface to WEPP using the open source MapServer GIS program
3. Iowa Daily Erosion Project
4. NetMap

== Forest and rangeland applications ==
The U.S. Forest Service has developed a suite of internet interfaces, the Forest Service WEPP (FS WEPP) interfaces, for easier applications by stakeholders in forest and rangeland management (forest engineers, rangeland scientists, federal and state regulatory personnel) and the general public. The interfaces can be readily accessed and run through the internet (http://forest.moscowfsl.wsu.edu/fswepp/), and do not require any in-depth understanding of the hydrology, hydraulic and erosion principles embedded in the WEPP model. The FS WEPP interfaces include:

- Cross Drain – to predict sediment yield from a road segment across a buffer
- Rock:Clime – to create and download a modified WEPP climate file
- WEPP:Road – to predict erosion from a forest road segment
- WEPP:Road Batch – to predict erosion from multiple forest road segments
- Disturbed WEPP – to predict erosion from rangeland and forest disturbances (wildfire, harvest operations)
- Tahoe Basin Sediment Model (under construction) – to predict runoff and erosion for the Lake Tahoe Basin
- WEPP FuME (Fuel Management) – to predict erosion from fuel management practices
- ERMiT (Erosion Risk Management Tool) – to predict the probability of sediment delivery with various mitigation treatments in each of five years following wildfire

== See also ==
- Erosion
- Erosion prediction
- Erosion control
- Sediment control
- Hydrology (agriculture)
- Hydrological modelling
- Hydrological transport model
- Runoff model (reservoir)
