= Erosion prediction =

Modeling of soil erosion

Erosion prediction is the process of predicting where erosion may happen in the future using data. There are dozens of erosion prediction models. Some models focus on long-term (natural or geological) erosion, as a component of landscape evolution. However, many erosion models were developed to quantify the effects of accelerated soil erosion i.e. soil erosion as influenced by human activity.

Most soil erosion models consider only soil erosion by water, however a few aim to predict wind erosion. Models which consider tillage erosion are rare. Also soil erosion models have been more commonly developed for use on agricultural landscapes, rather than on naturally vegetated areas (such as rangeland or forests). A few erosion models focus on erosion on mined areas.

The aim of the majority of soil erosion models is to predict average rates (often an annual average rate) of soil loss from an area such as a plot, a field or a catchment/watershed under various land management techniques. Some erosion models are purely statistical, others more mechanistic (or physically based). Two of the more widely used soil erosion models in North America are the Revised Universal Soil Loss Equation (RUSLE) and the Water Erosion Prediction Project erosion model (WEPP). Much of the mineland erosion literature is solely focused on fitting or improving RUSLE parameters. Few soil erosion models consider gully erosion, mostly due to difficulties in modelling these large erosional features.

Several studies have evaluated the ability of soil erosion models to realistically predict measured rates of erosion, mainly on agricultural landscapes. There is often a wide discrepancy between predicted and observed erosion rates. Thus soil erosion models are still better as research tools than as public policy and regulatory instruments or for prescriptive design measures for constructed landforms. However soil erosion models may provide useful guidance for the design engineer if adequately calibrated and verified for local conditions and if the design accounts for the uncertainty.

Most erosion modelling is applied to existing sites of known topography and material properties to guide land management activities. Designers of constructed landforms, however, have considerable control over the topography, cover soil placement, initial revegetation, and to a lesser extent the substrate properties – flexibility that is generally uneconomical for farmers and ranchers and most users of erosion models. On the other hand, miners have little input into post-closure land use practices and management.

Methods to estimate erosion rates include:

- purely statistical models
- subjectively determined erosion rates using expert judgement combined with a database of erosion rates of natural and reclaimed sites (natural and industrial analogs)
- surveying of existing erosional or depositional features of known age (or as determined by dating of deposits) to determine average erosion rates. Analysis of historical aerial photographs is often employed.
- site-specific empirical models that relate slope, watershed size, and rainfall
- empirical and semi-empirical or deterministic models based on laboratory and field flume measurements of erosion under simulated rainfall or flow conditions
- physically based gully erosion models
- landform and landscape scale models, often GIS-based, that apply erosion mechanics or statistical relationships to predict changes in topography and erosion rates
- sediment-budget models based on watershed monitoring.

== See also ==
- Erosion control
- Geomorphology
- Tillage erosion
