= Burned area emergency response =

Wildfire risk management process

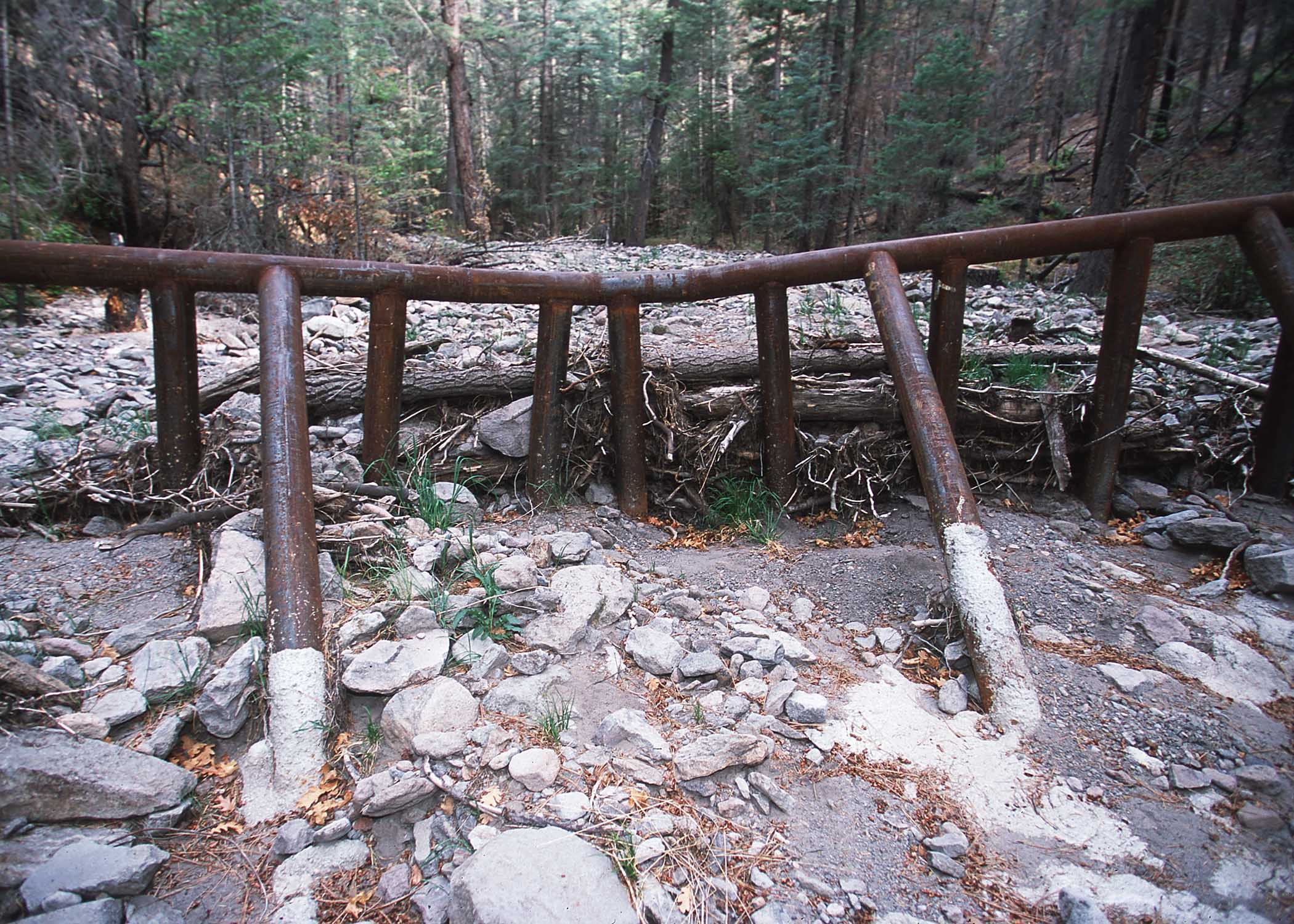
Debris-catcher rack

Burned area emergency response (BAER) is an emergency risk management reaction to post wildfire conditions that pose risks to human life and property or could further destabilize or degrade the burned lands. Even though wildfires are natural events, the presence of people and man-made structures in and adjacent to the burned area frequently requires continued emergency risk management actions. High severity wildfires pose a continuing flood, debris flow and mudflow risk to people living within and downstream from a burned watershed as well as a potential loss of desirable watershed values.

The burned area emergency response risk management process begins during or shortly after wildfire containment with risk assessments evaluating the effects of the wildfire against values needing protection. These risk assessments can range from simple to complex. An organized interdisciplinary team of subject matter experts (e.g., hydrologists, soil scientists, botanists, cultural resource specialists, engineers, etc.) used among other assessment tools hydrological modeling and soil burn severity mapping to assess potential flooding and vegetation recovery after the Cerro Grande Fire in 2000.

A BAER plan is developed based on the risk assessments and burned area land management objectives. The BAER Plan identifies the most effective treatments to address the identified risks. Plan implementation timeframes are dictated primarily by anticipated future events (e.g., next significant rainstorm) which also influence treatment options.

== Strategies and treatments ==
Burned area emergency response has mostly concentrated on risk reduction treatments with varying degrees of success. Risk avoidance, transfer and retention treatments are integral in the burned area emergency response risk management process.

=== Risk reduction ===
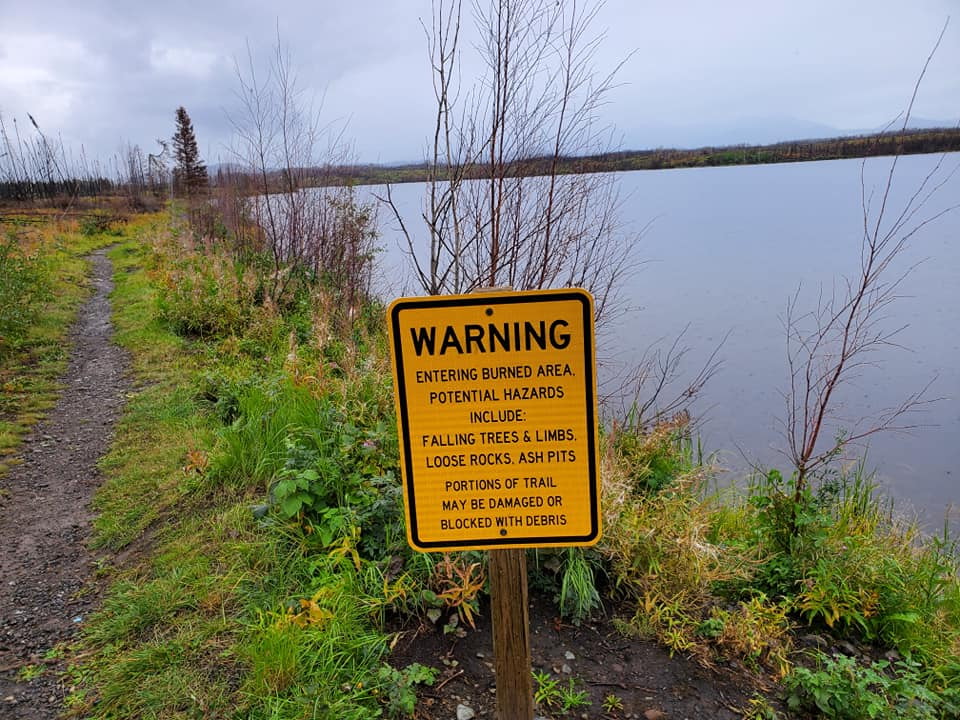
Warning sign in a burned-over area

Risk reduction treatments are designed to protect human life and safety and reduce flood severity, soil erosion and prevent the establishment of non-native plants. On 10 wildfires studied in Colorado, rainfall amount and intensity followed by bare mineral soil explained 63% of soil erosion variation. Research has shown that the risk of flooding, debris flows and mudflows are significantly increased with increasing rainfall intensities and burn severity and that some risk reduction treatments help for low but not high intensity rainfall events.

Mulches, erosion cloth and seeding retard overland flow and protect soil from rain drop impact and increase soil moisture holding capacity. Landscape structures (e.g., log erosion barriers, contour trenches, straw wattles) trap sediment and prevent slope rilling. Strip tillage and chemicals break up or reduce hydrophobic soils and improve infiltration. Wood and straw mulch reduced erosion rates by 60 to 80%, contour-felled log erosion barriers 50 to 70%, hydromulch 19% and post fire seeding had little effect the first year when rainfall events were small and intensities low.

In stream flood control treatments slow, delay, redistribute, or redirect water, mud and debris. Straw bale check dams, silt screens and debris retention basins slow water flow and trap sediment. Riparian vegetation stabilizes streambanks. Roads and culverts are armored and debris removed as needed. Water diversion implements protect facilities and property.

The chance of introducing new invasive plants to the burned area is reduced by restricting access or thoroughly cleaning all equipment, people and animals of seeds before entering a burned area. Research has shown that non-native plant cover is positively associated with post-wildfire seeded grass cover. Even though post-wildfire seeding operations require seed mix purity standards and the number of contaminated seeds may be small on a percentage based, that the application of very large amounts of seed (thousands of pounds) ensures that a significant number of non-native plant seeds will be distributed.

=== Risk avoidance ===
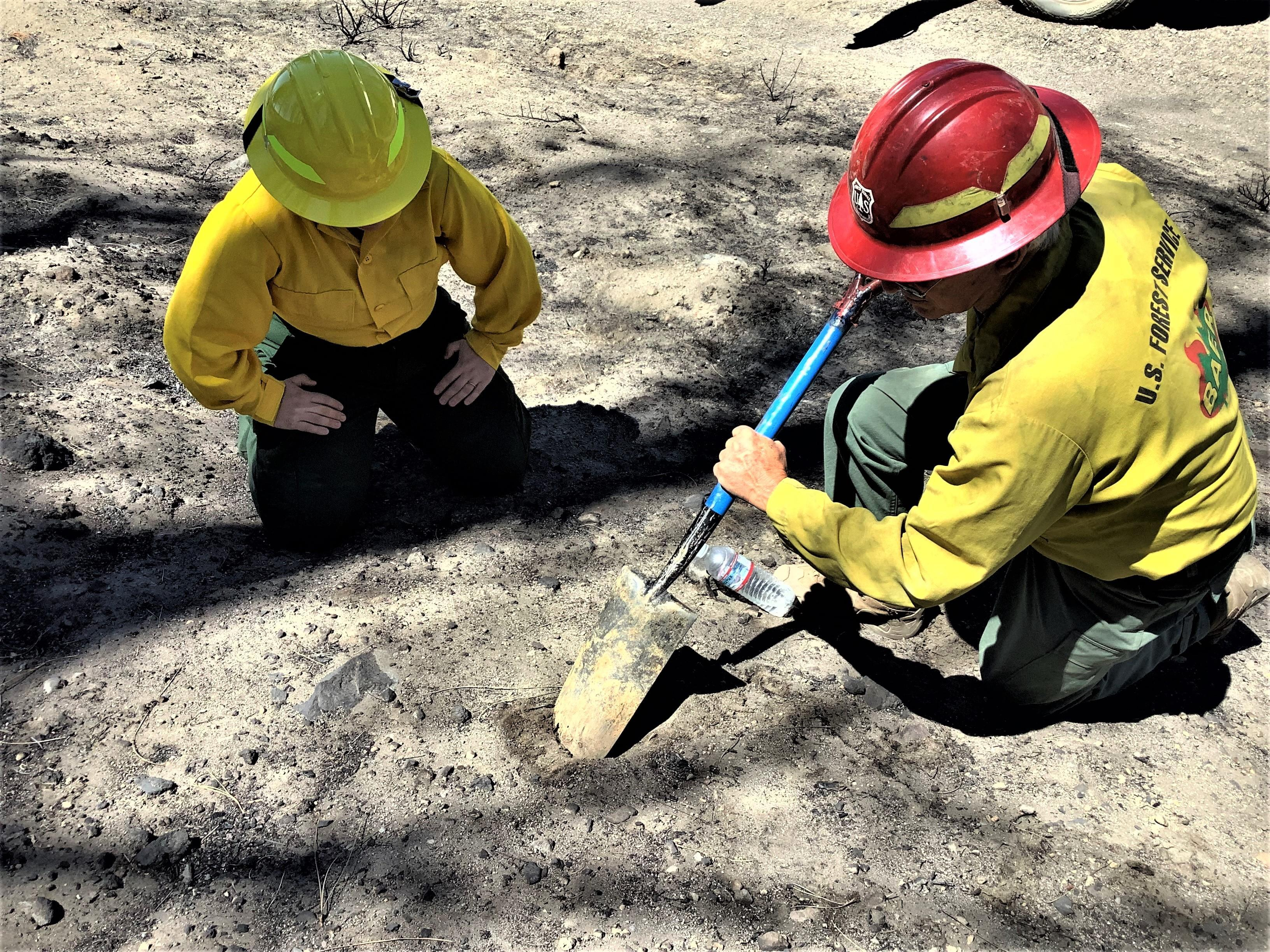
BAER Specialists assessing changed soil properties after the Tennant Fire in July 2021.

Avoidance treatments remove values at risk from risk prone areas. Frequently homes and other values are located on alluvial fans at the base of watersheds. The presence of the alluvial fans indicates a history of significant flooding, debris flows and mudflows with potential personal and property damage potential. Mobile property is temporally or permanently relocated. Evacuation planning and early warning systems are frequently used to protect people at risk. Flood peaks increase more rapidly with increases in rainfall intensity above a threshold value for the maximum 30 min intensity of approximately 10 mm per hour. That this rainfall intensity could be used to set threshold limits in rain gauges that are part of an early warning flood system after wildfire.

=== Risk transfer ===
Often it is not feasible to avoid or reduce risks. Flood insurance is a means of transferring risk to another party for values with insurable value.

=== Risk retention ===
Accepting the risk is an option when values at risk are small and inevitable or when the risks cannot be reduced, avoided or transferred (i.e., infrequent catastrophic events).

== See also ==
- Cuba Emergency Response System
- Emergency management
