= Universal Soil Loss Equation =

Mathematical model of erosion

The Universal Soil Loss Equation (USLE) is a widely used mathematical model that describes soil erosion processes.

Erosion models play critical roles in soil and water resource conservation and nonpoint source pollution assessments, including: sediment load assessment and inventory, conservation planning and design for sediment control, and for the advancement of scientific understanding. The USLE or one of its derivatives are main models used by United States government agencies to measure water erosion.

The USLE was developed in the U.S., based on soil erosion data collected beginning in the 1930s by the U.S. Department of Agriculture (USDA) Soil Conservation Service (now the USDA Natural Resources Conservation Service). The model has been used for decades for purposes of conservation planning both in the United States where it originated and around the world, and has been used to help implement the United States' multibillion-dollar conservation program. The Revised Universal Soil Loss Equation (RUSLE) and the Modified Universal Soil Loss Equation (MUSLE) continue to be used for similar purposes.

== Overview of erosion models ==
The two primary types of erosion models are process-based models and empirically based models. Process-based (physically based) models mathematically describe the erosion processes of detachment, transport, and deposition and through the solutions of the equations describing those processes provide estimates of soil loss and sediment yields from specified land surface areas. Erosion science is not sufficiently advanced for there to exist completely process-based models which do not include empirical aspects. The primary indicator, perhaps, for differentiating process-based from other types of erosion models is the use of the sediment continuity equation discussed below. Empirical models relate management and environmental factors directly to soil loss and/or sedimentary yields through statistical relationships. Lane et al. provided a detailed discussion regarding the nature of process-based and empirical erosion models, as well as a discussion of what they termed conceptual models, which lie somewhere between the process-based and purely empirical models. Current research effort involving erosion modeling is weighted toward the development of process-based erosion models. On the other hand, the standard model for most erosion assessment and conservation planning is the empirically based USLE, and there continues to be active research and development of USLE-based erosion prediction technology.

== Description of USLE ==
The USLE was developed from erosion plot and rainfall simulator experiments. The USLE is composed of six factors to predict the long-term average annual soil loss (A). The equation includes the rainfall erosivity factor (R), the soil erodibility factor (K), the topographic factors (L and S), and the cropping management factors (C and P). The equation takes the simple product form:

$$A = R K L S C P$$

The USLE has another concept of experimental importance, the unit plot concept. The unit plot is defined as the standard plot condition to determine the soil's erodibility. These conditions are when the LS factor = 1 (slope = 9% and length = 22.1 m (72.6 ft) where the plot is fallow and tillage is up and down slope and no conservation practices are applied (CP=1). In this state:

$$K = A/R$$

A simpler method to predict K was presented by Wischmeier et al. which includes the particle size of the soil, organic matter content, soil structure and profile permeability. The soil erodibility factor K can be approximated from a nomograph if this information is known. The LS factors can easily be determined from a slope effect chart by knowing the length and gradient of the slope. The cropping management factor (C) and conservation practices factor (P) are more difficult to obtain and must be determined empirically from plot data. They are described in soil loss ratios (C or P with / C or P without).

Various techniques have emerged over the last few decades to compute the five RUSLE factors. However, determining the P factor has proven to be challenging as there is usually a lack of geospatial information on the specific soil conservation practices in a given region. Thus, to estimate the P factor value in the RUSLE formula, a combination of land use type and slope gradient is often used, where a lower value indicates more effective control of soil erosion.

Creating field boundaries, such as stone walls, hedgerows, earth banks, and lynchets, effectively prevented or reduced soil erosion in pre-industrial agriculture. Recently, a novel P-factor model for Europe has been developed from the data retrieved during a statistical survey that recorded the occurrence of stone walls and grass margins in EU countries. While this is one of the first efforts to incorporate cultural landscape features into a soil erosion model on a continental scale, the authors of the study pointed out several limitations, such as the small number of surveyed points and the chosen interpolation technique. It has been demonstrated that landscape archaeology has the potential to fill this gap in the data about soil conservation practices using a GIS-based tool called Historic Landscape Characterisation (HLC). Starting from the assumptions that the construction of field boundaries has always represented an effective method to limit soil erosion and that the efficiency of any conservation measures to mitigate soil erosion increases with the increasing of the slope, a new P factor equation has been developed integrating the HLC within the RUSLE model. In a recent study, modeling landscape archaeological data in a soil loss estimation equation enables deeper reflection on how historical strategies for soil management might relate to current environmental and climate conditions.

== See also ==
- Certified Professional in Erosion and Sediment Control (CPESC)
- Erosion control
- WEPP (Water Erosion Prediction Project), a physically based erosion simulation model
