= Polymer soil stabilization =

Engineering technique

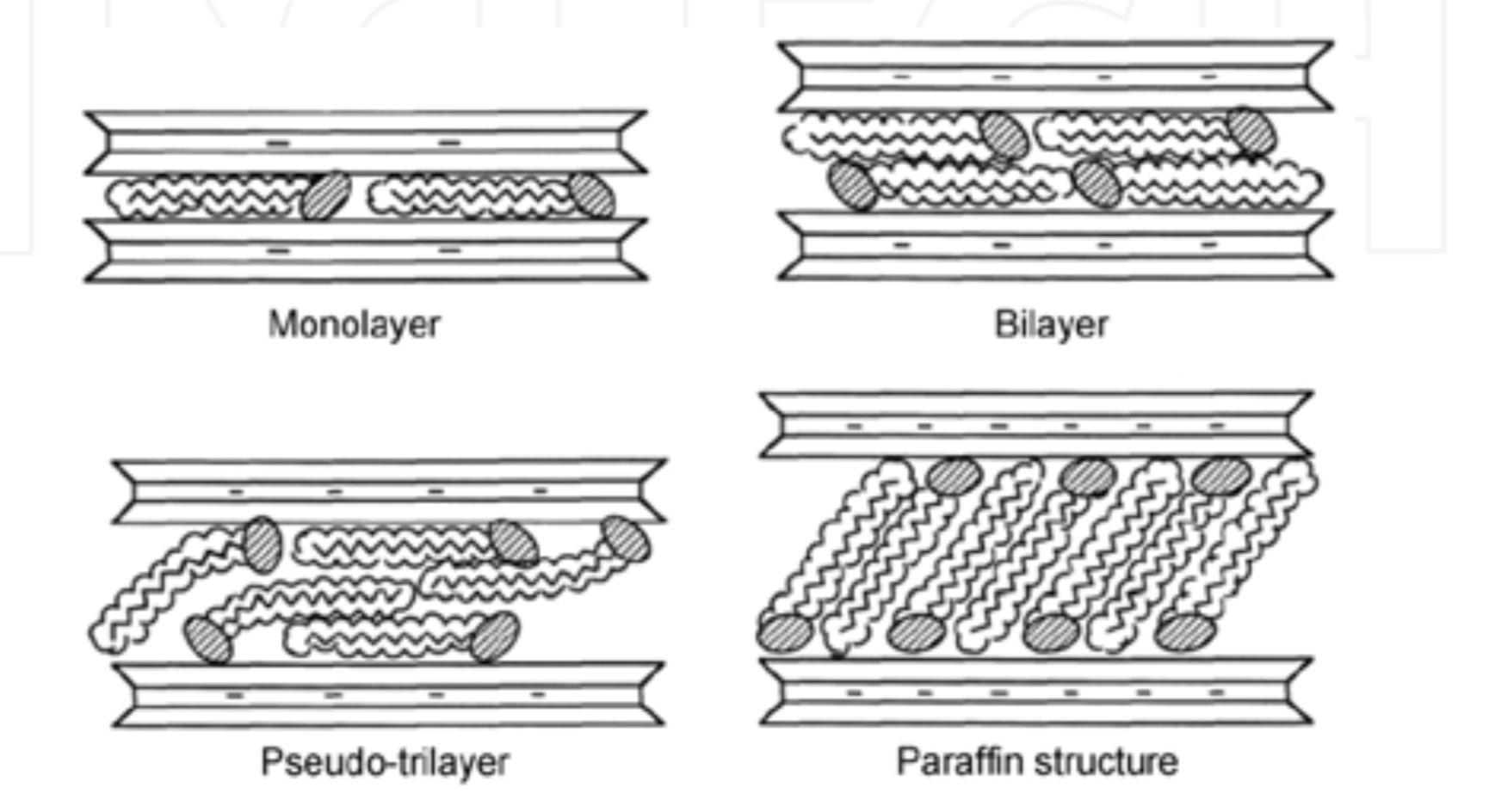
Polymers stabilize soils through interactions with soil particles. Above is a schematic representing different configurations which polymer molecules (such as alkylammonium cations) can adopt when adsorbed between clay layers, in response to the magnitude of charge density on the clay surface. Greater charge densities here result in righter packing and greater clay- clay distances.

Polymer soil stabilization refers to the addition of polymers to improve the physical properties of soils, most often for geotechnical engineering, construction, or agricultural projects. Even at very small concentrations within soils, various polymers have been shown to increase water retention and reduce erosion, increase soil shear strength, and support soil structure. A wide range of polymers have been used to address problems ranging from the prevention of desertification to the reinforcement of roadbeds.

Polymers that have been tested for soil stabilization effects include a range of synthetic polymers and biopolymers. Biopolymers in particular offer a more eco-friendly alternative to traditional chemical additives, such as ordinary cement, which may generate a large amount of carbon dioxide during production or cause lasting environmental damage.

Polymers mainly affect the aggregation and strength of soils through their interactions with fine clay particles. Coatings of adsorbed polymers on clays can increase their steric stabilization by preventing clay particles from approaching each other as closely. Alternatively, polymer molecules that bond with multiple clay particles promote flocculation. Hydrogel networks can result in more indirect strengthening within soils by creating a scaffolding for soil particles. Additional strength can be imparted to polymer networks within soils through chemical cross-linking and curing.

== Overview ==
Synthetic polymers began replacing other chemical binders for soil stabilization in agriculture in the late 20th century. Compared to traditional chemical binders, polymer soil additives can achieve the same amount of strengthening at much lower concentrations – for example, mixtures of 0.5-1% of various biopolymers have strength levels that match or exceed those of 10% cement mixtures in soils. Synthetic polymers, including geopolymers, and biopolymers, have been tested for their beneficial interactions with soils. Methods for introducing polymers into soils include mixing, injecting, spraying, and grouting. Liquid polymers, sold as concentrated solutions, can be applied deep within the soil through pressure injection or applied directly to uncompacted soil.

=== Synthetic polymers ===
Alumino-silicate based, synthetic geopolymers provide many of the same binding properties as Portland cement. Compared to other polymer additives, many geopolymers are quite durable, with high mechanical strength and thermal stability. They react readily with calcium hydroxide in water, which allows them to act as cementitious binders. Geopolymers offer the advantage of being more environmentally friendly and energy-efficient to produce than traditional chemical additives, and can be synthesized from waste products such as mine tailings or fly ash. When these waste products are treated with an alkaline reagent, the aluminosilicate rapidly depolymerizes and polycondenses into a rigid three dimensional polymeric structure that coats and strengthens soil pores. Geopolymers have been applied to stabilize gypseous soils because of their resistance to sulfur and other chemical attacks, which weaken traditional cement.

The synthesis of chitosan, an example of a biopolymer which has been employed as a soil additive for its stabilizing properties.

=== Biopolymers ===
Biopolymers are synthesized as a result of biological processes, and are often less harmful to the landscape and its biota because of their natural origins. Of the three types of biopolymers, polysaccharides have proven more useful as soil binders than polynucleotides or polypeptides. Biopolymers that have been tested for use in soil stabilization include cellulose, starch, chitosan, xanthan, curdlan, and beta-glucan. Some biopolymers are sensitive to water, and wetter soils exhibit weaker biopolymer-clay cohesion. Because of this, when wetted, gel-type biopolymers form hydrogels which have decreased tensile strength but significantly higher compressive strength compared to the original soil. Protein-based biopolymers, though less common, have been used as an alternative to polysaccharides for projects requiring greater water resistance.

Biopolymers may increasingly replace synthetic polymers for soil stabilization projects. They are more environmentally friendly than many other chemical soil additives, and can achieve the same amount of strengthening at much lower concentrations. Increasing use of biopolymers could offset the carbon dioxide emissions associated with cement production, which can be as high as 1.25 tons of carbon dioxide per ton of cement.

== Polymer-soil chemistry ==
Polymer treatments modify the size, shape, and cohesion of soil aggregates by changing the interactions between soil particles. Because polymer-soil interactions occur on the surfaces of soil particles, the amount of surface area in the soil (in other words, its dominant particle size) is of great importance. Polymers have only weak interactions with the large sand- and silt-sized particles of soil, while they bond directly to finer clays. Although polymers mainly interact with the clay fraction of soils, they do change the properties of sandy soils to a lesser degree. Polymer structure dictates how they will interact with clay particles. For example, block copolymers result in very different soil properties than homopolymers, as do ionic and nonionic polymers. Additionally, the mechanisms by which different polymers adsorb onto clay particle surfaces result in different soil properties and responses.

=== Steric stabilization ===
Polymers on the surfaces of the colloidal fraction of soils promote steric stabilization of those particles by preventing them from approaching each other and aggregating. This effect is seen in a variety of aqueous and nonaqueous environments, and is not affected by electrolytes in solution. The degree of steric stabilization depends on the amount of clay surface covered by adsorbed polymers, the strength of the polymer bond, the thickness of the polymer layer, and the favorability of the solvent for the polymer loops and tails. Block and graft copolymers, made up of two different homopolymers with differing solubilities in the suspension medium, are most often used for steric stabilization. When synthesized to have alternating regions of hydrophobic and hydrophilic monomers, copolymers can stabilize the suspension because their hydrophobic group adsorbs strongly to the colloid surface while the hydrophilic group is attracted to the solvent. In general, the adsorption of polymers to clay surfaces is entropically favored because one polymer molecule displaces many water molecules which were previously bound to the soil particle.

Polymer and clay particle suspensions have been used to understand the mechanism of this steric stabilization in soils. Consider a homopolymer adsorbed to the surfaces of clay particles in suspension. As the clay particles approach each other to within two times the thickness of the polymer layers, the loops and tails of the polymers on one surface will start to block those on the other surface, leading to a decrease in configurational entropy. This is unfavorable because it increases the Gibbs free energy of the system, and it will be more energetically favorable for the colloid particles to remain farther apart.

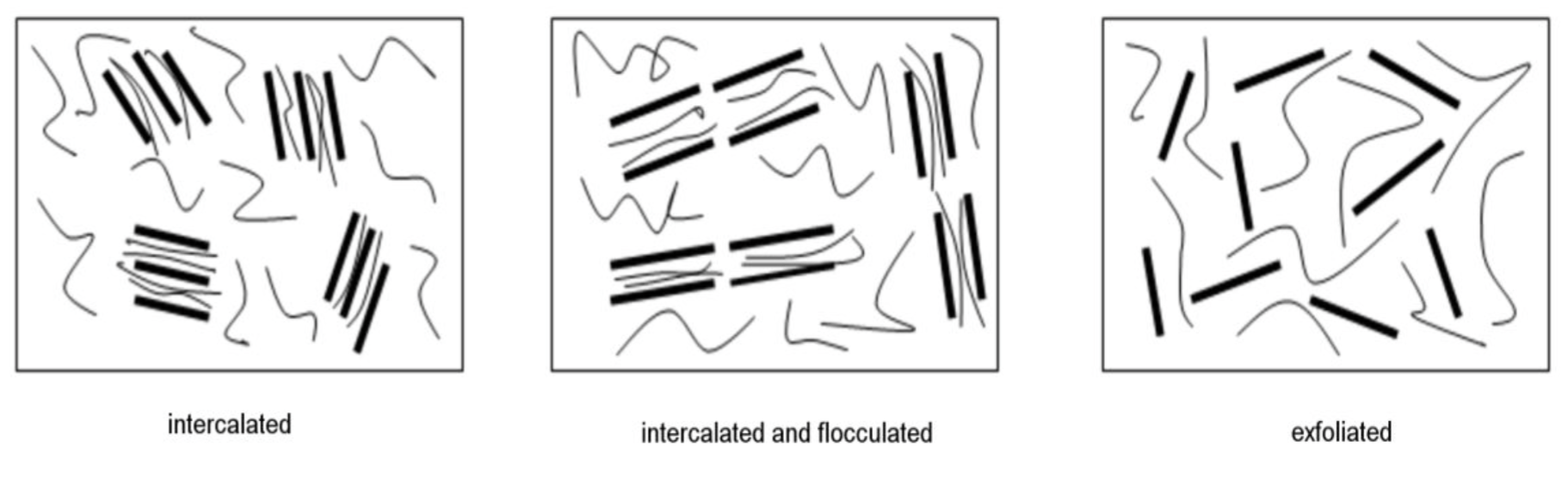
The morphology of polymer-clay aggregates is dictated by the entropic and enthalpic contributions to the energy of their interactions. Three possible morphologies depicted above include (1) intercalated, in which polymer molecules alternate with clay layers, (2) flocculated, in which the alternating clay/polymer layers begin to aggregate, and (3) exfoliated, in which a polymer matrix supports individual, separated clay layers.

Overall, the free energy of steric interactions (ΔG_{s}) can be expressed as a function of both elastic repulsive energy (ΔG_{el}) and the free energy of mixing (ΔG_{mix}):

ΔG_{s} = ΔG_{el} + ΔG_{mix}

The elastic repulsive energy (ΔG_{el}), increases as more polymers adsorb to the surfaces of clay particles. This can be modeled as:

ΔG_{el} = 2k_{B}TΓln(Ω(h)/Ω(∞))

where k_{B} is the Boltzmann constant, T is the temperature, Γ is the number of adsorbed polymers per unit surface area, and Ω(h) and Ω(∞) are the number of available conformations at h and infinite distances. ΔG_{s} due to steric interactions is also a function of the free energy of mixing (ΔG_{mix}_{)}. Most commonly, this will favor greater distances between polymer molecules in solution.

=== Flocculation ===
Alternatively, under different conditions, polymers can enhance flocculation. Particle aggregates are held together more strongly by polymers than by electrolytes. Such interactions are called bridging flocculation because a single polymer chain is linked to multiple soil particles. Examples of common bridging polymers include polyacrylamide (PAM) and polyethylene oxide. In one study, PAM was found to increase the size of kaolinite flocs in suspension experiments from 10 μm to several millimeters. The maximum strength benefits of flocculation are achieved when polymers cover a surface area equivalent to half the polymer saturation capacity. Addition of polymer beyond this point causes the polymer to act as a lubricant, allowing the soil particles to slip across each other.

The structure of montmorillonite clay, a 2:1 clay made up of tetrahedral sheets surrounding an octahedral sheet. The clay particles are only weakly bound to each other, so various cations or polymers can be bound within the interlayer space.

Biopolymers have been shown to strengthen soils both by cohesion with clay particles to form polymer-clay matrices and by promoting the aggregation of coarser soil particles with each other within the polymer-clay matrix. The hydroxyl groups on polysaccharide biopolymers allow them to form hydrogen bonds directly with charged clay particles (in dry soils), as well as with soil pore water itself (in moist soil). These interactions are promoted by the high surface area of both the biopolymers themselves and the clay particles they bond with. When ionized polymers (such as many biopolymers) with the same charge as clay particles adsorb to their surface, they increase the electrical double layer repulsion.

=== Cross-linking and curing ===
The strength of polymer chains can be enhanced by cross-linking, which increases the interactions between chains through bonding with another reactant. The high mechanical strength of soil/polymer mixtures after cross-linking can make many polymers more suited for soil stabilization projects. Curing time after polymer addition can also affect the strength of the polymer-soil structures formed. After seven days of curing, the liquid polymer SS299 resulted in soil with two times the compressive strength of untreated soil. Some polymers can also acquire strength much more rapidly during curing than traditional, non-polymeric chemical additives.

== Applications ==
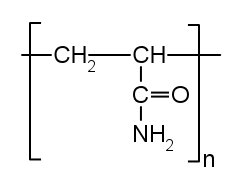
The structure of polyacrylamide (PAM), a common synthetic polymer flocculating agent used to increase aggregate sizes in clay-rich soils.

Soil characteristics that have been altered by addition of polymers include compressive strength, volume stability, hydraulic durability, and conductivity. Polymers can help prevent soil erosion and increase infiltration of water by strengthening soil aggregates and supporting soil structure. The properties of the soil itself are a dominant control on the ability of polymers to interact with it. A study of the cationic, alkaline polymer SS299 (a commercially produced additive) found that the properties of treated soils depend on the plasticity index of the original soil, which reflects its clay content.

Hydrogel swelling of biopolymers reduces the amount of soil pore space, restricting the flow of water and suiting polymer hydrogels for construction projects seeking to minimize water seepage and support vegetation growth. Biopolymers can be added to soils along with synthetic polymers to utilize the properties of both polymers. By increasing the water retention and infiltration rates in soils, the addition of biopolymers increases the availability of water for plants. This is particularly applicable in arid regions like deserts where droughts leave soils susceptible to high rates of erosion during precipitation events. By retaining water, the enhanced soils reduce runoff and its accompanying erosion. PAM has been widely applied as a soil stabilizer for agriculture, both to retain water in fields and to improve run-off water quality by reducing the amount of sediment entering rivers and streams.

== See also ==
- Soil stabilization
- Soil conditioner
- Hydrogel agriculture
- Rhoca-Gil
- Plastic pollution
- Microplastics
