= Sediment control =

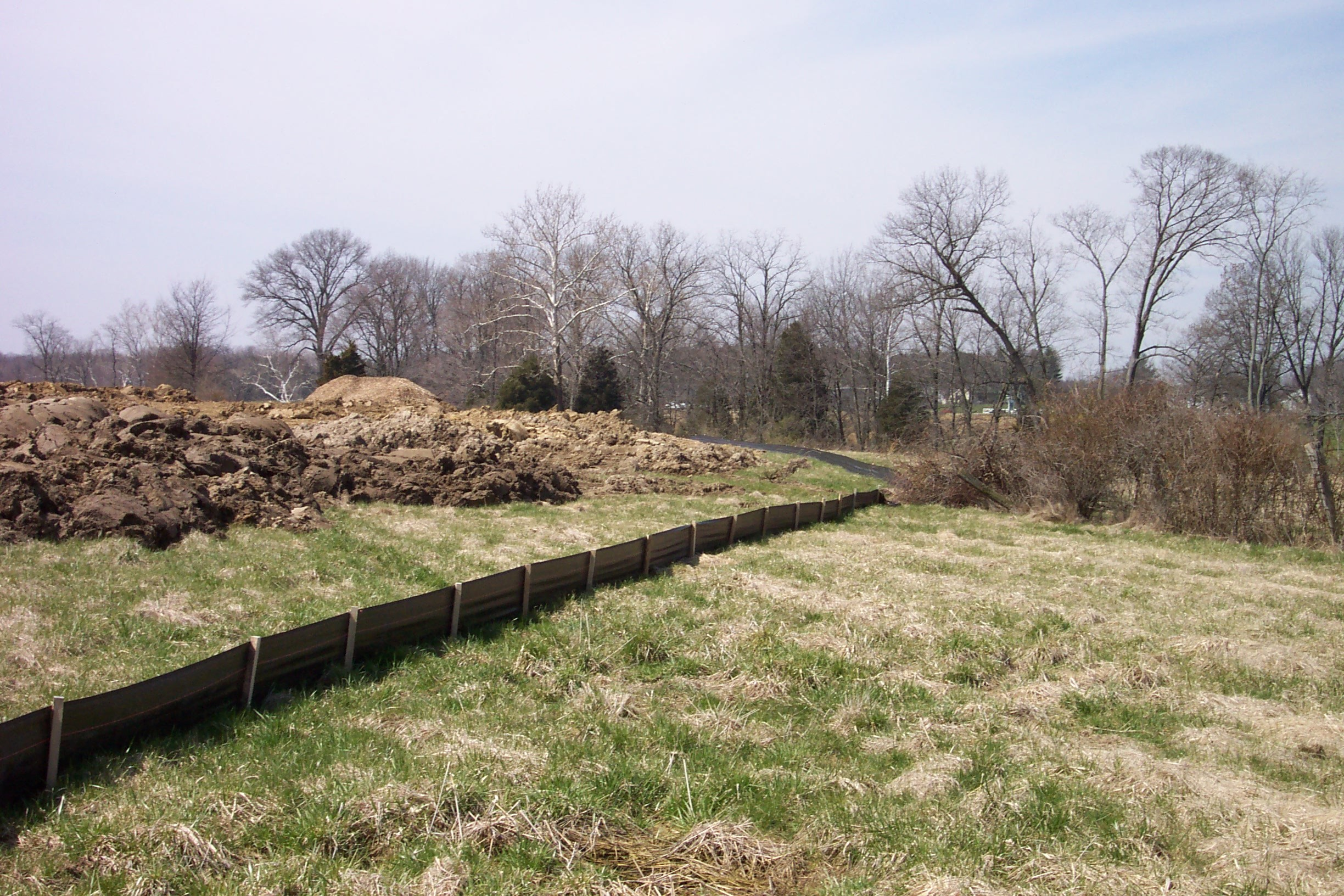
Silt Fence installed on a construction site.

A sediment control is a practice or device designed to keep eroded soil on a construction site, so that it does not wash off and cause water pollution to a nearby stream, river, lake, or sea. Sediment controls are usually employed together with erosion controls, which are designed to prevent or minimize erosion and thus reduce the need for sediment controls. Sediment controls are generally designed to be temporary measures, however, some can be used for storm water management purposes.

== Commonly used sediment controls ==
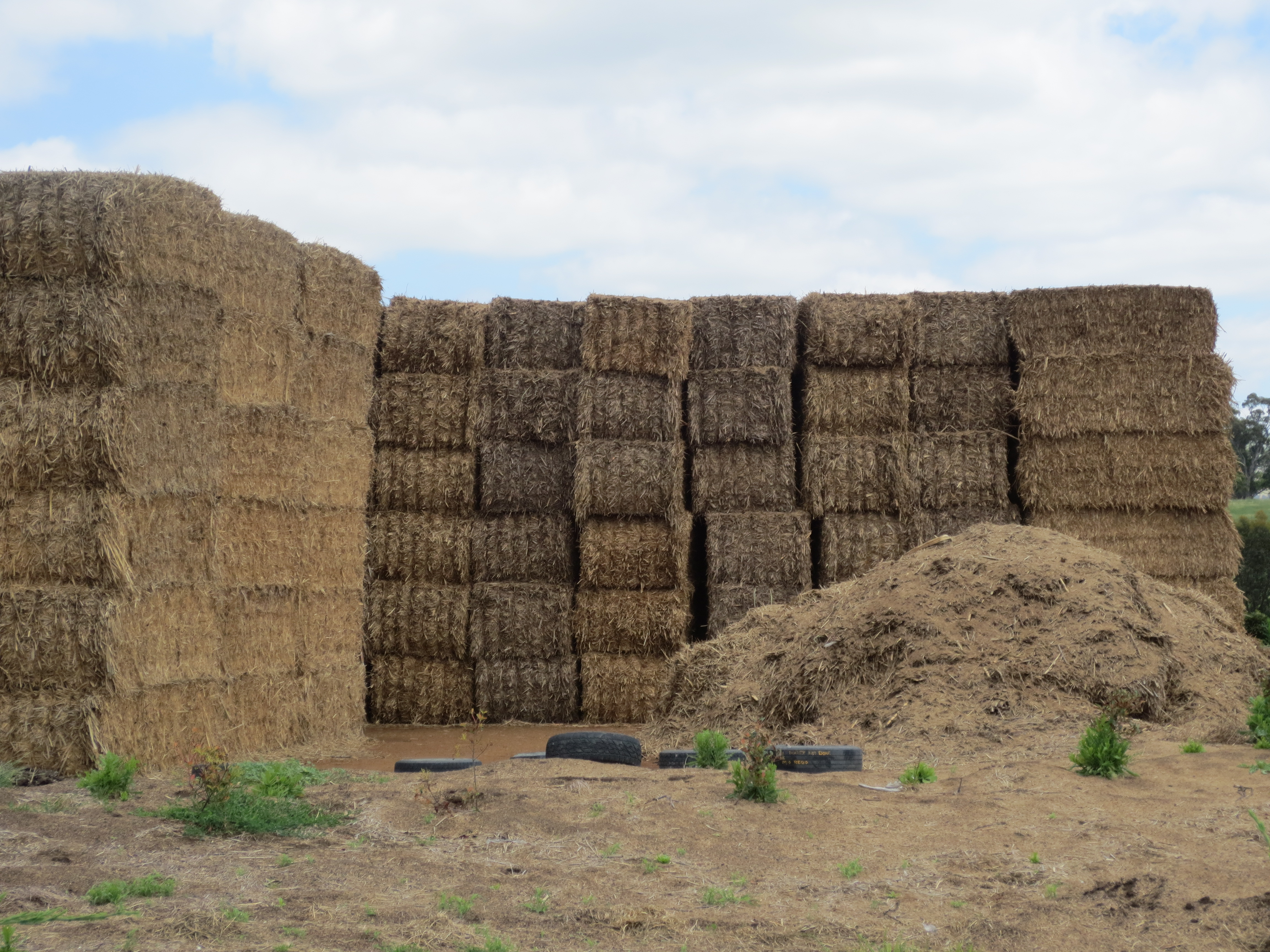
hay bales are sometimes used in sediment control

- Check dam
- Diversion dike (temporary)
- Fiber rolls
- Gabions
- Gel Flocculant
- Siltbusters
- Sand bag barrier
- Sediment basin
- Sediment trap
- Silt fence
- Storm drain inlet protection
- Straw bale barrier
- Turbidity curtain

== Active treatment systems ==
Treatment of silt impacted water using equipment and chemical addition, commonly called an active treatment system, is a relatively new form of sediment control for the construction industry. These systems are designed to reduce Total Suspended Solids (TSS) from entering nearby water bodies where silt pollution can be of environmental concern. Sediment-laden stormwater is collected and or pumped, and a chemical flocculant is added to aide in clarification. Types of flocculant include;

- Natural Polymers: Derived from natural sources, such as starch, chitosan, and guar gum.
- Synthetic Polymers: These include polyacrylamide and their derivatives, which can be tailored to specific water treatment needs. They are effective at lower dosages compared to inorganic flocculants.
- Inorganic Flocculants: Aluminum Sulfate (Alum), Ferric Chloride, Ferric Sulfate, Polyaluminum chloride

Extreme caution should be observed when using cationic flocculants like chitosan or positively charged polyacrylamide or polyDADMAC which cause hypoxia in fish. The use of anionic, negatively charged, flocculants is best practice on open loop treatment systems to ensure the protection aquatic habitat, fish and invertebrates.

The water is then either filtered (sand or cartridge filter,) or settled (lamella clarifier or weir tank) prior to discharge. Chemical sediment control is currently used on some construction sites around the United States and Europe, typically larger sites where there is a high potential for damage to nearby streams. Another active treatment system design uses electrocoagulation to flocculate suspended particles in the stormwater, followed by a filtration stage. Active treatment systems require technical expertise to operate effectively as multiple types of equipment are utilized.

== Passive treatment systems ==
Chemical treatment of water to remove sediment may also be accomplished passively. Passive treatment systems use the energy of water flowing by gravity through ditches, canals, culverts or other constructed conveyances to effect treatment. Self dosing products, such as Gel Flocculants, are placed in the flowing water where sediment particles, colloids and flow energy combine to release the required dosage, thereby creating heavy flocs which can then be easily filtered or settled. Natural woven fibers like jute are often used in ditch bottoms to act as filtration media. Silt retention mats can also be placed in situ to capture floccules. Sedimentation ponds are often utilized as a deposition area to clarify the water and concentrate the material. Mining, heavy construction and other industries have used passive systems for more than twenty years. These types of systems are low carbon as no external power source is needed, they require little skill to operate, minimal maintenance and are effective at reducing Total Suspended Solids, some heavy metals and the nutrient phosphorus.

Stormwater treatment can also be achieved passively. Stormwater management facilities (SWMF's) are generally designed Stokes' law to remove particulate matter larger than 40 micron in size, or to detain water to reduce downstream flooding. However, regulation on the effluent from SWMF's is becoming more stringent, as the detrimental impact from nutrients like Phosphorus either dissolved from (fertilizers), or bound to sediment particles from construction or agriculture runoff, cause algae and toxic cyanobacteria (aka Blue-green algae) blooms in receiving lakes. Cyanotoxin is of particular concern as many drinking water treatment plants can not effectively remove this toxin. In a recent municipal stormwater treatment study, an advanced sedimentation technology was used passively in large diameter stormwater mains upstream of SWMF's to remove an average of 90% of TSS and phosphorus during a near 50 year rain event.

== Regulatory requirements ==
All states in the U.S. have laws requiring installation of erosion and sediment controls (ESCs) on construction sites of a specified size. Federal regulations require ESCs on sites 1 acre (0.40 ha) and larger. Smaller sites which are part of a common plan of development (e.g. a residential subdivision) are also required to have ESCs. In some states, non-contiguous sites under 1-acre (4,000 m^{2}) are also required to have ESCs. For example, the State of Maryland requires ESCs on sites of 5,000 sq ft (460 m^{2}) or more. The sediment controls must be installed before the beginning of land disturbance (i.e. land clearing, grubbing and grading) and must be maintained during the entire disturbance phase of construction. Approval for use of any chemical flocculant must be obtained prior to its deployment.

== See also ==
- Certified Professional in Erosion and Sediment Control (CPESC)
- Geotechnical engineering
- Geotextile (material used in erosion & sediment controls)
- Nonpoint source pollution
- Stormwater
- Universal Soil Loss Equation
