= Level spreader =

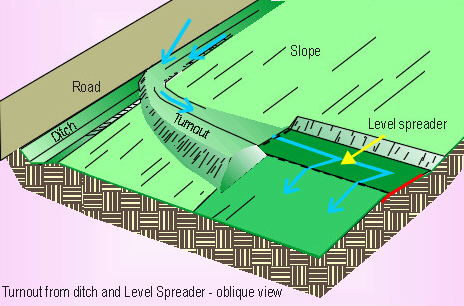
Illustration of a level spreader designed to infiltrate road drainage

A level spreader is an erosion control device designed to reduce water pollution by mitigating the impact of high-velocity stormwater surface runoff. It is used both on construction sites and for permanent applications such as drainage for roads and highways. The device reduces the energy level in high-velocity flow by converting it into sheet flow, and disperses the discharged water so that it may be infiltrated into soil.

Level spreaders may be used in conjunction with runoff infiltration devices such as bioretention systems, infiltration basins and percolation trenches.

== See also ==
- impervious surface
- low impact development
- urban runoff
