= Cuba emergency response system =

Warning system for potentially dangerous weather events in Cuba

The Cuba emergency response system is the warning system for potentially dangerous weather events that strike Cuba. It was developed in its current form in response to the catastrophic Hurricane Flora in 1963, which was the starting point of modern Cuban disaster risk reduction.

== Hurricane Dennis and Hurricane Ivan ==
In July 2005, Cuba weathered Hurricane Dennis and in September 2004 Hurricane Ivan – two of the most powerful storms to strike the Caribbean in the last decades. In the case of Dennis, just 10 people died amid massive damage to island, while Ivan claimed not a single victim. In both cases, Cuba succeeded in evacuating more than 1.5 million people, emptying out entire flood-prone coastal areas. People were provided buses to pre-arranged shelters staffed with medical personnel and stocked with food and water, as well as to private homes that took in the evacuees

== Cuba's emergency system ==
Cuba is the largest and most populated island in the Caribbean yet consistently experiences the lowest death tolls during hurricane season. According to United Nations, it's not because Cubans are lucky but because they're prepared. According to Oxfam, from 1996 to 2002, only 16 people were killed by the six hurricanes that struck Cuba.

Cuba's meteorological institute has 15 provincial offices. They share data with US scientists and project storm tracks. Around 72 hours before a storm's predicted landfall, national media issue alerts while civil protection committees check evacuation plans and shelters. Hurricane awareness is taught in schools and there are practice drills for the public before each hurricane season.

State-run television and the civil defense authority broadcast to the population with information and instructions about what measures to take. Each residential block has a person assigned to take a census on who is being evacuated to which shelter, with special attention paid to the elderly and pregnant women, and as efforts are organized locally, compliance is increased.

The response system has four stages. In Stage I, which takes place 72 hours before landfall, the Civil Defense Structure is placed on an alert, and the media begins broadcasting warnings of the impending storm. At Stage II, 48 hours before the storm, the DCN (National Civil Defense) in each municipality or zone begins to organize hurricane preparation efforts, such as sending students home from schools. Shelters are inspected and supplied, and evacuations begin. Once the hurricane makes landfall, Stage III begins, during which the media continues to provide coverage of the hurricane, and the DCN attempts to maintain lines of communication. After the hurricane has passed, Stage IV begins, and people return to their homes, after they have been certified as sound by the DCN. Rescue operations and tallies of damages begin.

== See also ==
- Emergency management
- Burned area emergency response
- Criticism of the government response to Hurricane Katrina
- Northern Territory National Emergency Response
