= Fiber roll =

Temporary erosion control

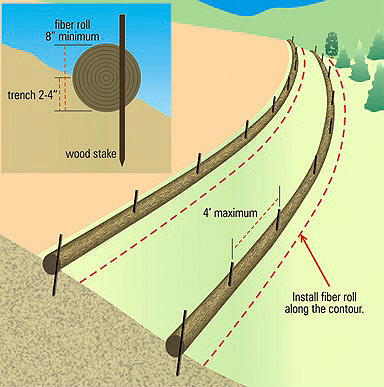
Installation detail for fiber rolls with specifications recommended by U.S. EPA.

A fiber roll is a temporary erosion control and sediment control device used on construction sites to protect water quality in nearby streams, rivers, lakes and seas from sediment erosion. It is made of straw, coconut fiber or similar material formed into a tubular roll.

== Installation ==
Each horizontal contour level row of fiber rolls is installed on slopes, ending with one at the base of the slope, below an active construction area before soil disturbance (earth moving) begins. The space between each row of fiber roll is dependent on the steepness of the slope. The steeper the slope, the more rows of evenly spaced horizontal contour level fiber rolls are used. Each fiber roll is installed on a horizontal contour level in shallow trenches 2 to 4 inches (5 to 10 cm) deep and fastened to the ground with wooden stakes.

Properly installed fiber rolls are effective at trapping sediment, generally more effectively than straw bales. During rain storms, the rolls intercept surface stormwater runoff (but not concentrating or channeling the runoff) and reduce the velocity of flow. Water passes through a fiber roll while leaving behind the sediment on the uphill side of the roll, thereby reducing sediment erosion.

== Limitations ==
Fiber Rolls have several limitations to their uses:

- Fiber rolls may be difficult to move once they become saturated with water.
- Fiber rolls should not be used on very steep land that is prone to mudslides, landslides or creep.
- If fiber rolls are not properly staked into the ground, they may be carried away by high flows.

== See also ==
- Geosynthetics
- Geotechnical engineering
- Nonpoint source pollution
- Stormwater
