= Maccaferri =

Italian multinational company

- Company type: Private
- Industry: Civil Engineering
- Founded: 1879
- Headquarters: Bologna, Italy
- Key people: Stefano Susani (Chief Executive Officer)
- Revenue: €669.366 million (2024)
- Number of employees: ~3.400 (As of 2025)
- Website: www.maccaferri.com

Officine Maccaferri S.p.A. is an Italian multinational company, headquartered in Zola Predosa, Bologna. The company specialises in products for the construction industry. Maccaferri's products are used for: retaining structures, soil reinforcement, embankment stabilisation, river and canal hydraulic works, coastal protection, erosion control, rockfall mitigation, debris flows and avalanche protection. The company provides technical support to designers, contractors and end-users.

Maccaferri has 70 subsidiaries, 30 production facilities and 3,300 employees.

== History ==
The company name can be traced back to the 16th century (the name Maccaferri is a literal translation of ‘he who strikes iron’), when Giovanni (Johannes) "Maccaferri" was registered with the blacksmiths guild. However, to join the guild a person had to be 20 years old. As Johannes was only 14 at the time, the Bologna Senate granted a dispensation and approved his membership on 28 June 1550.

Over 300 years later, on 3 May 1879, the Chamber of Commerce in Zola Predosa, Italy, recorded the registration of the workshop ("Officina") of a certain Raffaele Maccaferri, head of the Maccaferri family at the time. This was based in Gesso, near Lavino.

As a blacksmith, the company of Raffaele Maccaferri manufactured items such as gates, fences, columns, staircases and railings used in the churches, houses and businesses in the Bologna area. Of the two sons of Raffaele, the eldest, Angelo, guided the commercial growth of the business, whilst Luigi was the industrial specialist. He expanded the capacity and introduced technology for wire-drawing into the factory. Soon afterwards the "gabion" was re-invented using wire mesh (gabions had been in existence for millennia prior to this, but had been constructed from natural materials).

The company's first major project was in 1893 when Maccaferri's gabions were used to repair a breach in the weir at Casalecchio di Reno. The gabions were simple sack gabions, filled in-situ with rocks.

The same Chamber of Commerce in Zola Predosa also records that the company changed its name to "Raffaele Maccaferri and Sons" in 1895.

At the turn of the century, Maccaferri obtained exclusive rights to the patent for a new, box shaped gabion, designed by the Cremona engineer, Edigio Palvis. Due to its regular shape and dimensions, the box gabion proved more successful than sack gabions as used at the closure of the breach at Caselecchio di Reno at creating retaining structures and river training works which were becoming increasingly important.

In the early 1900s, Maccaferri began industrialising the technology, and the first branch factories were built in Grenoble and Naples. Key structures built at this time included protection to the River Tiber in Rome in 1906 and alongside the River Arno in 1908 for the National Railway Company.

The company's first sales catalogue was produced in 1906 and in 1907 the company became "Officine Maccaferri & Pisa". During the First World War, the metal craftsmanship was paused, whilst wire production was used for the manufacture of barbed wire, bastions and other mesh products for military purposes.

Between the wars, the General Manager, Alessandro Maccaferri recognised the need to reconfigure and expand the company further, with increasing ventures overseas. In 1926, Maccaferri's gabions were used for embankment protection at the Genale Dam, commissioned by the Somali Government.

In 1944, during the Second World War the factory in Zola Predosa was destroyed by aerial bombardment. The company was restarted in 1946 under the guidance of Gaetano and Guglielmo Maccaferri, sharing the company leadership. In 1951, Maccaferri opened another factory in Bellizzi (Salerno), building upon the sales successes of the prior years.

The steel wire double twisted steel wire mesh was used in the manufacture of many different products for numerous applications. Galvanising the steel wire with zinc was a standard approach within the wire industry. In the 1950s and 1960s PVC coating was added to the wire to offer a longer design life, especially in more demanding applications. This new coating technology was useful when the Reno Mattress was invented soon afterwards; a larger flatter gabion with a smaller mesh size, used for river erosion protection works. Maccaferri's products were used to reconstruct roads and river banks following the devastating floods in Florence in 1966.

In the ‘70’s, the company opened new factories in Canada (Agincourt, Ontario), USA (Williamsport, Maryland) and, Brazil (Jundiai, São Paulo).

Until the early 1990s, the company only supplied products manufactured from the company’s double twist steel wire hexagonal mesh.

Since the 2000s, the company has grown through acquisition and geographical expansion. Growth also included diversification and addition of products to the Maccaferri portfolio, including construction geosynthetics (polymeric materials used within the geotechnical industry), rockfall protection and products for tunneling.

At the end of 2020, the shares representing the entire share capital of Officine Maccaferri S.p.A., following the competitive auction launched by the Court of Bologna pursuant to ex art. 163bis of the Italian Bankruptcy Law, were awarded to Stellex Capital Holdings Luxembourg S.a r.l.

== Key acquisitions ==
Key acquisitions have included:

- 2006: Linear Composites Ltd (UK based manufacturer of composite polymer ropes and straps)
- 2006: BMD Texteis Ltda (Brazil based manufacturer of geosynthetic products used in construction, automotive and agriculture industries)

== Corporate structure ==
The company was incorporated as a joint stock company (società per azioni) under the laws of the then Kingdom of Italy (now Republic of Italy) on May 25, 1920 and is registered with the Register of Companies of Bologna. Its current registered office is in via J.F. Kennedy, 10 - 40069, Zola Predosa, Italy.

== Major projects ==
Significant projects include:

- India, Sikkim - Construction of new Pakyong Airport
- Botswana - Jwaneng-Debswana Mine, Rockfall protection
- Albania - Kosovo Highway: 103 km Rreshen to Kalimash
- Greece - Egnatia Metsovo Motorway
- Italy - Bologna-Milan High speed railway line
- Russia - Slope protection of railway line for Amur gas processing plant

== See also ==
- Gabion
- Maccaferri gabion
