= Hydroseeding =

Planting technique

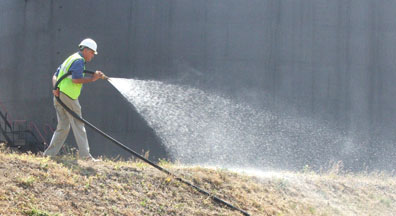
Hydroseeding being carried out at the Isle of Grain, Kent, UK

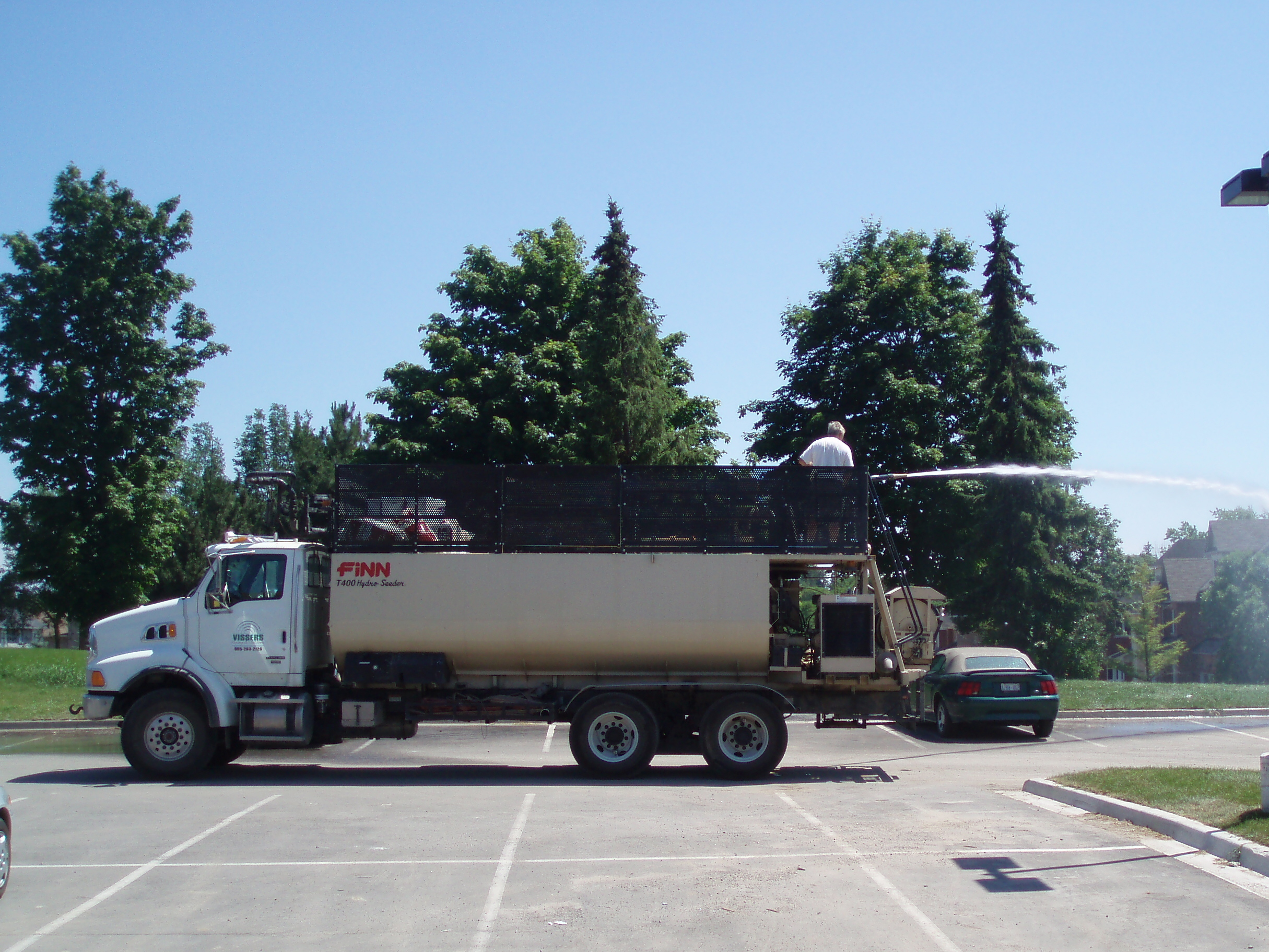
A commercial hydroseeder

Hydroseeding (or hydraulic mulch seeding, hydro-mulching, hydraseeding) is a planting process that uses a slurry of seed and mulch. It is often used as an erosion control technique on construction sites, as an alternative to the traditional process of broadcasting or sowing dry seed.

== Description ==
The hydroseeding slurry is transported in a tank, either truck-mounted or trailer-mounted and sprayed over prepared ground. Helicopters have been used to cover larger areas. Aircraft application may also be used on burned wilderness areas after a fire, and in such uses may contain only soil stabilizer to avoid introducing non-native plant species. Hydroseeding is an alternative to the traditional process of broadcasting or sowing dry seed. A study conducted along the lower Colorado River in Arizona reported that hydroseeding could be used to restore riparian vegetation in cleared land.

The slurry often has other ingredients including fertilizer, tackifying agents, fiber mulch, and green dye.

== History ==
Originating back to the US in the 1940s, Maurice Mandell from the Connecticut Highway Department discovered that by mixing seed and water together, the resulting mulch could be spread and sprayed over the steep and otherwise inaccessible slopes of the Connecticut expressways.

Eventually this new method of seeding spread to other countries. On a visit to the United States in the 1960s, Francis Bellingham seeing the potential for using hydroseeding on construction of the new motorway network began importing hydroseeders and straw/bitumen mulchers into the UK.

== Advantages ==
If planting a relatively large area, hydroseeding can be completed in a very short period of time. It can be very effective for hillsides and sloping lawns to help with erosion control and quick planting. Hydroseeding will typically cost less than planting with sod, but more than broadcast seeding. Results are often quick with high germination rates producing grass growth in about a week and mowing maintenance beginning around 3 to 4 weeks from the date of application. Fiber mulch accelerates the growing process by maintaining moisture around the seeds thereby increasing the rate of germination.

Seeds are applied to tilled soil using a high pressure hose. The seeds are likely mixed into a water-based spray that often contains mulch, fertilizer, lime, or other substances that promote seed growth.
