= Hydrogel agriculture =

Agricultural technology

Hydrogel agriculture technology uses insoluble gel-forming polymers to improve the water-holding properties of different soils, such as clays and sandy loams. This can increase water-holding and water use (up to 85% for sand), improve soil permeability, reduce the need for irrigation, reduce compaction, soil erosion, and leaching, and improve plant growth.

Desertification and lack of water threaten agriculture in many arid and semi-arid regions of the world; these may be mitigated with hydrogels.

== Hydrogels ==
Hydrogels are hydrophilic crosslinked polymers that form three-dimensional molecular networks which can absorb and hold great amounts of water.

Different types may be suitable for agricultural use. A starch-based (grafing) hydrogel is biodegradable and cheap, and can be modified to adjust its ability to hold water. Cross-linked acrylic acid polymer hydrogels are commercially available; they are effectively insoluble but slowly break down releasing toxic acrylamide.

== Potential uses in agriculture ==
Hydrogels of different kinds could be useful in agriculture, reducing drought stress in plants, making better use of irrigation water and fertilizer.

Superabsorbent hydrogel polymers can in principle influence soil permeability, density, structure, texture, evaporation and infiltration rates of water through soils. They can also allow pesticides to be released slowly over a long period, increasing effectiveness and reducing side-effects such as pesticide runoff. There has therefore been considerable research interest into the possible use of hydrogels in agriculture. For example, a hydrogel based on gum tragacanth increases the water content of clay soil by up to 5.35% and of sandy loam by up to 5.5%; it could also be used to release calcium chloride slowly over a prolonged period.

Suitably prepared hydrogels can simultaneously supply and slowly release pesticides (such as herbicides) in the soil, and increase a sandy soil's retention of water. Hydrogels developed for this purpose include polymers of oligooxyethylene methacrylate, linked by ionic and covalent bonds to a herbicide such as 4-chloro-2-methylphenoxyacetic acid (CMPA). Other hydrophilic polymers studied have been made from a variety of different acrylate monomers to release the pesticides 2,4-D and CMPA. These offer different combinations of pesticide release rate and soil water retention. Hydrogels can also be used to encapsulate the insecticide cypermethrin and the fungicide copper sulphate. Superabsorbent polymers can be used to release phosphate fertiliser slowly, by making an ester bond between polyvinyl alcohol and phosphoric acid. A polymer/clay superabsorbent composite material made by attaching acrylamide to finely powdered attapulgite (a fuller's earth clay) shows promise for its excellent water retention and low cost compared to polyacrylamide hydrogel.

Recent research has introduced biodegradable cellulose-based superabsorbent hydrogels that significantly improve water retention in sandy soils, offering a sustainable solution for agricultural water management.

== Commercialization ==
In 2015, the Indian Agriculture Research Institute (IARI) reported the development of a novel hydrogel for agricultural use. It was intended to help farmers to cope with drought, making efficient use of water in arid and semi-arid regions of India. the product is to be commercialized by the Ministry of Science and Technology's National Research Development Corporation (NRDC) in collaboration with a company based in Chennai, Reliance Industries Limited.

== See also ==
- Agriculture, Ecosystems & Environment
- Farm water
- Rainfed agriculture
- Swelling capacity
- Water conservation
