= Gabion =

Cage full of rock

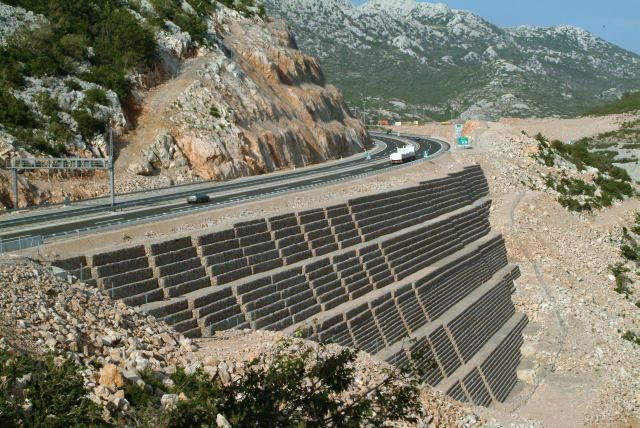
An inclined stacked wall of gabions supporting a multilane roadway near Sveti Rok, Croatia

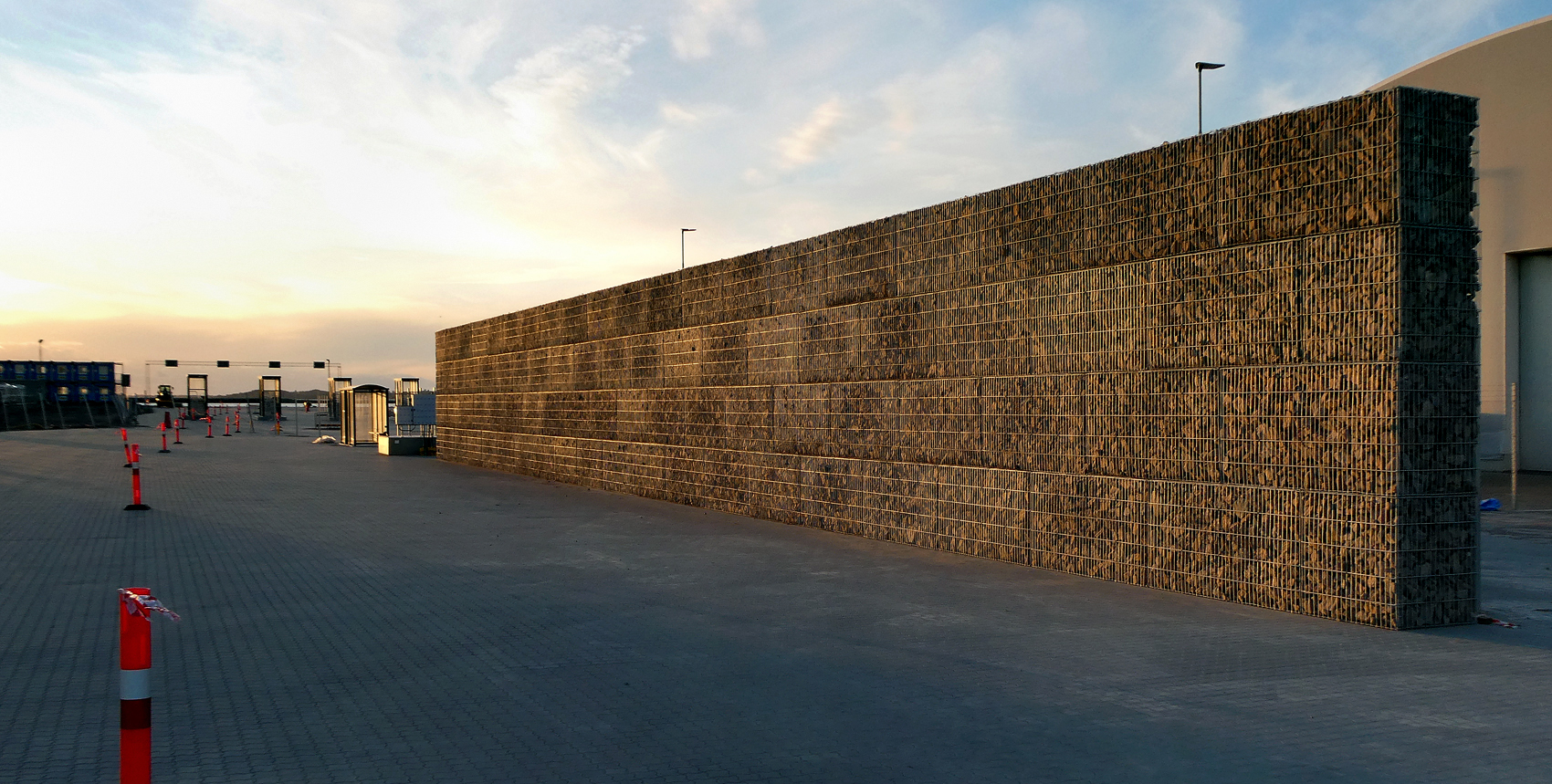
Gabions as X-ray protection during customs inspection

A gabion (from Italian gabbione meaning "big cage"; from Italian gabbia and Latin cavea meaning "cage") is a cage, cylinder, or cube, typically mesh, filled with solid material suitable to use in various civil engineering and military applications. Ballasts include rocks, sand, soil, used tires, and other recycled items.

Among the most common civil engineering uses are erosion control, retaining walls, and impact attenuation; in the military gabions commonly protect forward operating bases and artillery firing positions against small arms and indirect fragmentary explosives. Applications include sleeping quarters, mess halls, checkpoints, and revetments for aircraft.

== Design ==
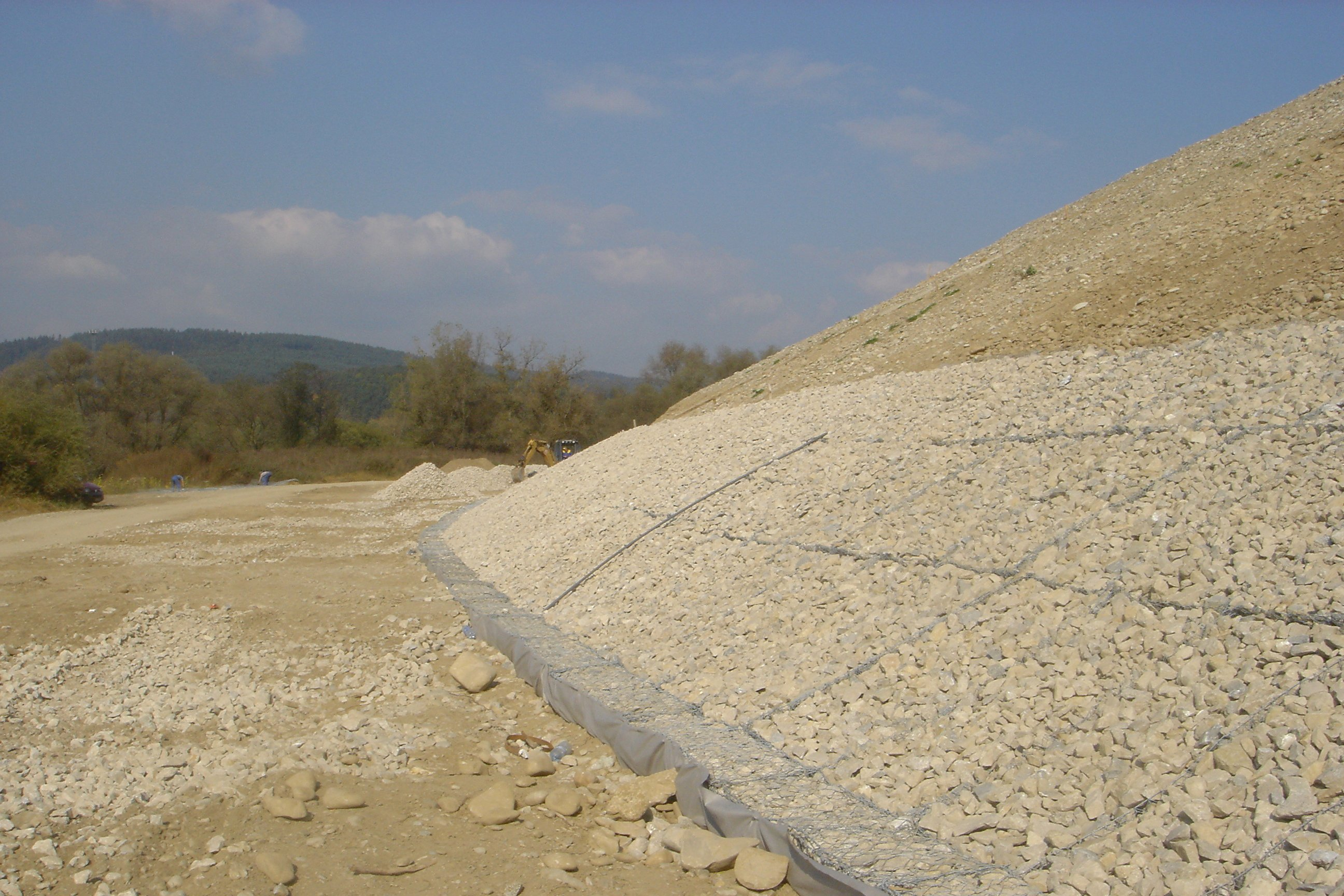
Mattress gabions protecting a bank

The shape, proportion, and internal and external construction, reflect the use of each form of gabion.

Types:

- Maccafierri: a box shaped gabion made out of galvanized steel, stainless steel, or PVC-coated steel wire mesh.
- Bastion: a gabion lined with an internal membrane, typically of nonwoven geotextile, to permit the use of granular soil fill instead of rock.
- Mattress: a form of gabion designed to be laid flat singly rather than stacked.
- Trapion: a form of gabion with a trapezoidal cross-section, designed for stacking to give a sloped rather than stepped face.
- Dykion: A gabion that also functions as a levee (which is also sometimes called a dyke) when needed.

== Uses ==
=== Civil engineering ===
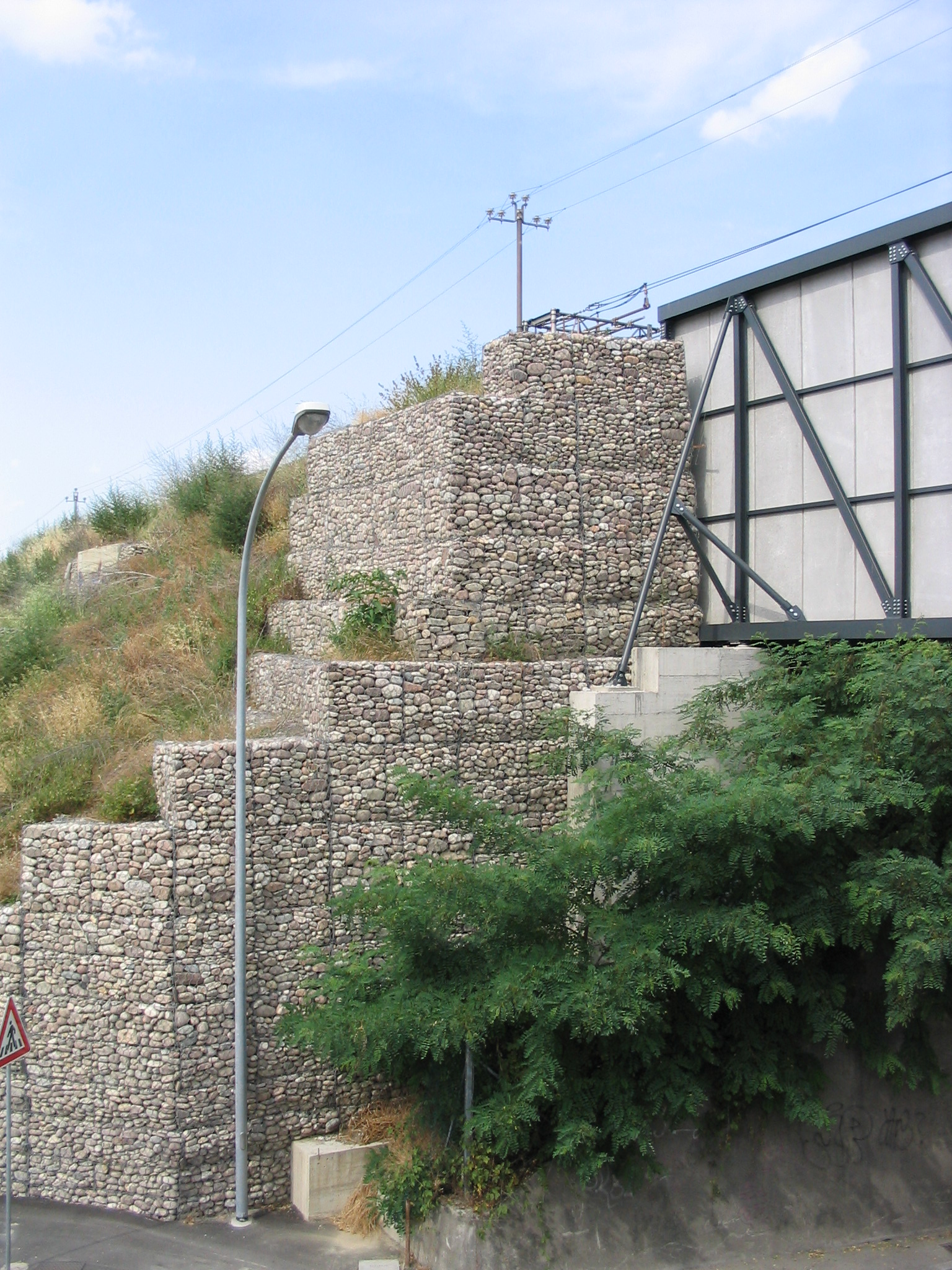
Gabions stepped with the slope as a bridge abutment

Leonardo da Vinci designed a type of gabion called a Corbeille Leonard ("Leonard[o] basket") for the foundations of the Sforza Castle in Milan.

The Maccaferri family produced sack-shaped gabions starting in 1893. A box-shaped wire mesh gabion for erosion control, the most common civil engineering application, was refined in the early 20th century and patented as the "Maccaferri gabion". it was used to stabilize shorelines, stream banks and slopes. Other uses evolved, including retaining walls, noise barriers, temporary flood walls, silt filtration from runoff, small dams, fish screening, channel lining, and stepped weirs, which enhance the rate of energy dissipation in a channel.

In 1911, Gaetano Maccaferri established business relationships in Spain, Greece, and Austria. Prior to World War II, the company began diversifying through acquisitions in various industrial sectors, though the erosion control sector remained the core business. This process led to the global expansion of Maccaferri technology and expertise, with a direct presence in over forty countries across all continents.

The life expectancy of gabions depends on that of their wire. Galvanized steel wire is most common, but PVC-coated and stainless steel wire are also used. PVC-coated galvanized gabions have been estimated to last for 60 years. Some gabion manufacturers guarantee a structural integrity of 50 years.

In the United States, gabions were first used in stream erosion control projects beginning in 1957. More than 150 grade-control structures, bank revetments and channel deflectors were constructed on two U.S. Forest Service sites. Eventually, a large portion of the in-stream structures failed due to undermining and lack of structural integrity of the baskets. In particular, corrosion and abrasion of wires by movement of the streams’ bedload compromised the structures, which then sagged and collapsed into the channels. Other gabions were toppled into channels as trees grew atop their revetments, leveraging them toward the streams.

Gabions have also been used in building construction, as in the Dominus Winery in the Napa Valley, California, constructed between 1995 and 1997. The exterior is formed by modular wire mesh gabions containing locally quarried stone, allowing air movement through the building and moderating interior temperatures.

=== Military ===
Early gabions were round open-ended cages made from wickerwork filled with earth and used as military fortifications. In one example, willow twigs were brought from East Lothian to make gabions to protect gun emplacements during the April 1573 siege of Edinburgh Castle.

Such early military gabions were most often used to protect sappers and siege artillery gunners. The wickerwork cylinders were light and could be carried relatively conveniently in the ammunition train, particularly when made in nesting diameters. In use they would be stood on end, staked in position, and filled. During the Crimean War, local shortages of brushwood led to use of scrap hoop-iron from hay bales, inspiring purpose-built sheet-iron gabions.

Today, gabions are used to protect forward operating bases (FOBs) against small arms and explosive, fragmentary, indirect fire such as mortar, or artillery rounds. Applications include sleeping quarters, mess halls, anywhere large concentrations of unprotected soldiers might gather, blast walls, and aircraft revetments. A modern form is the Hesco bastion.

=== Illustrations ===
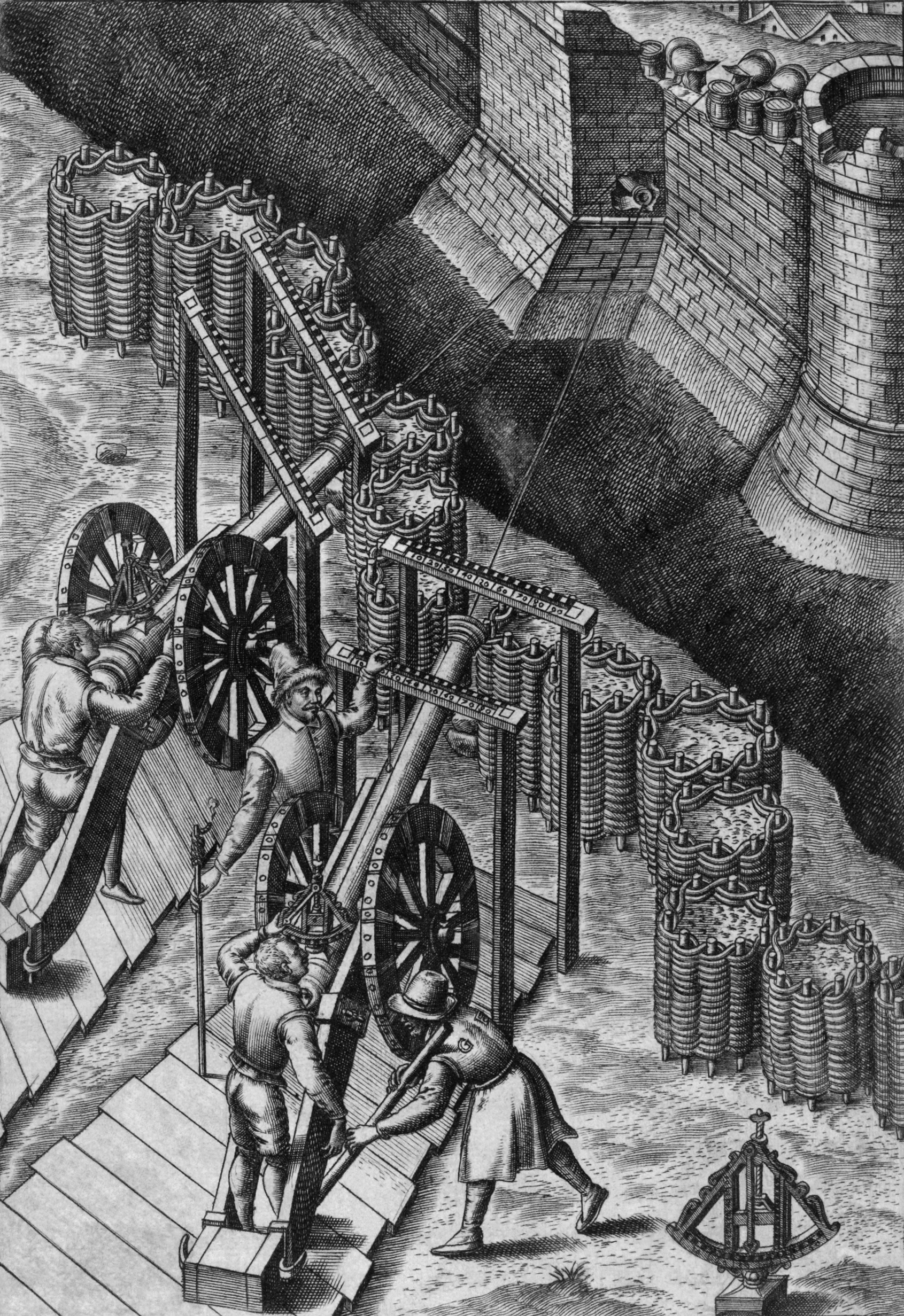
Gabions protecting cannon, late 16th-century

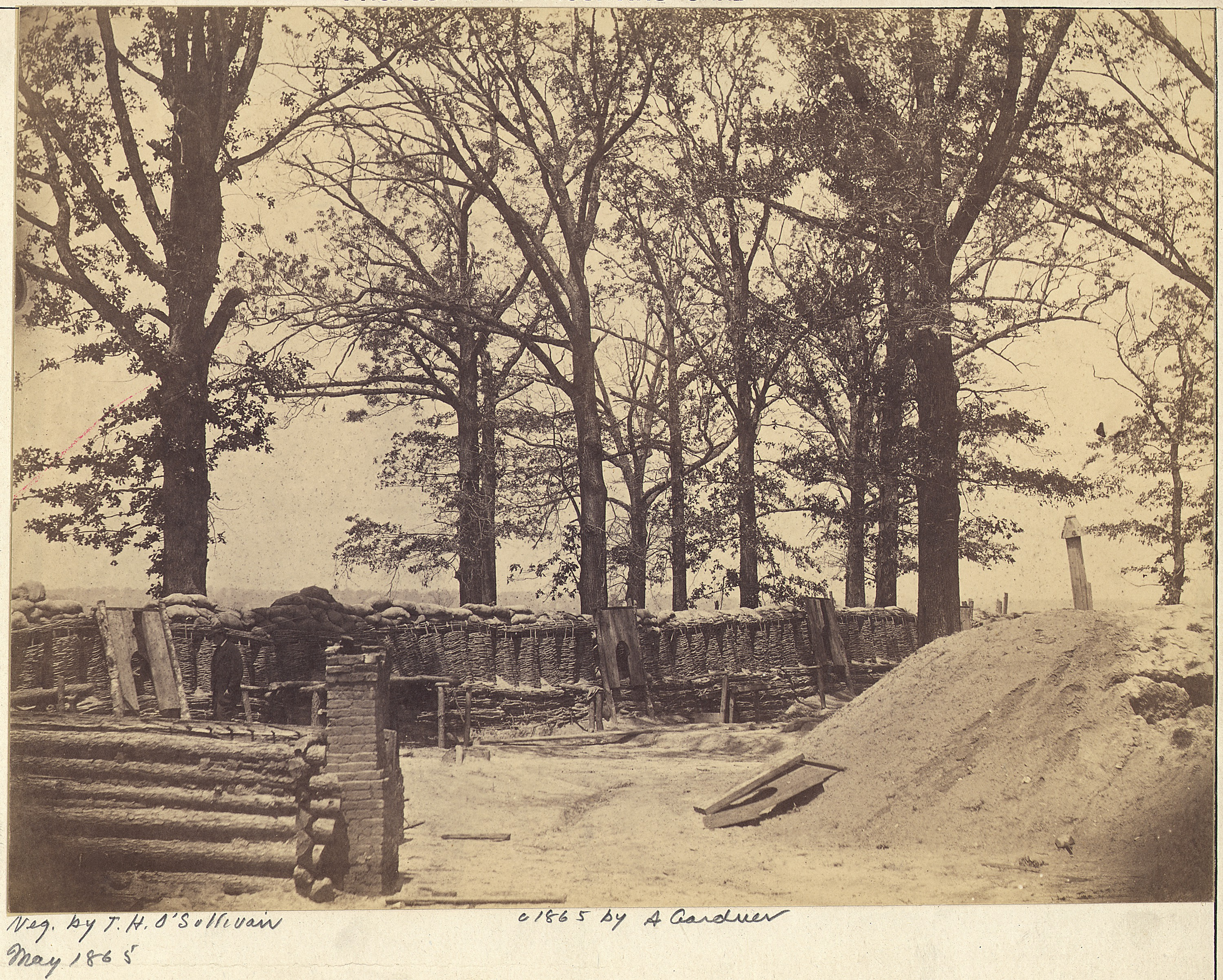
A gabion breastwork (in background) protecting artillery at Fort Stedman in Virginia in the American Civil War

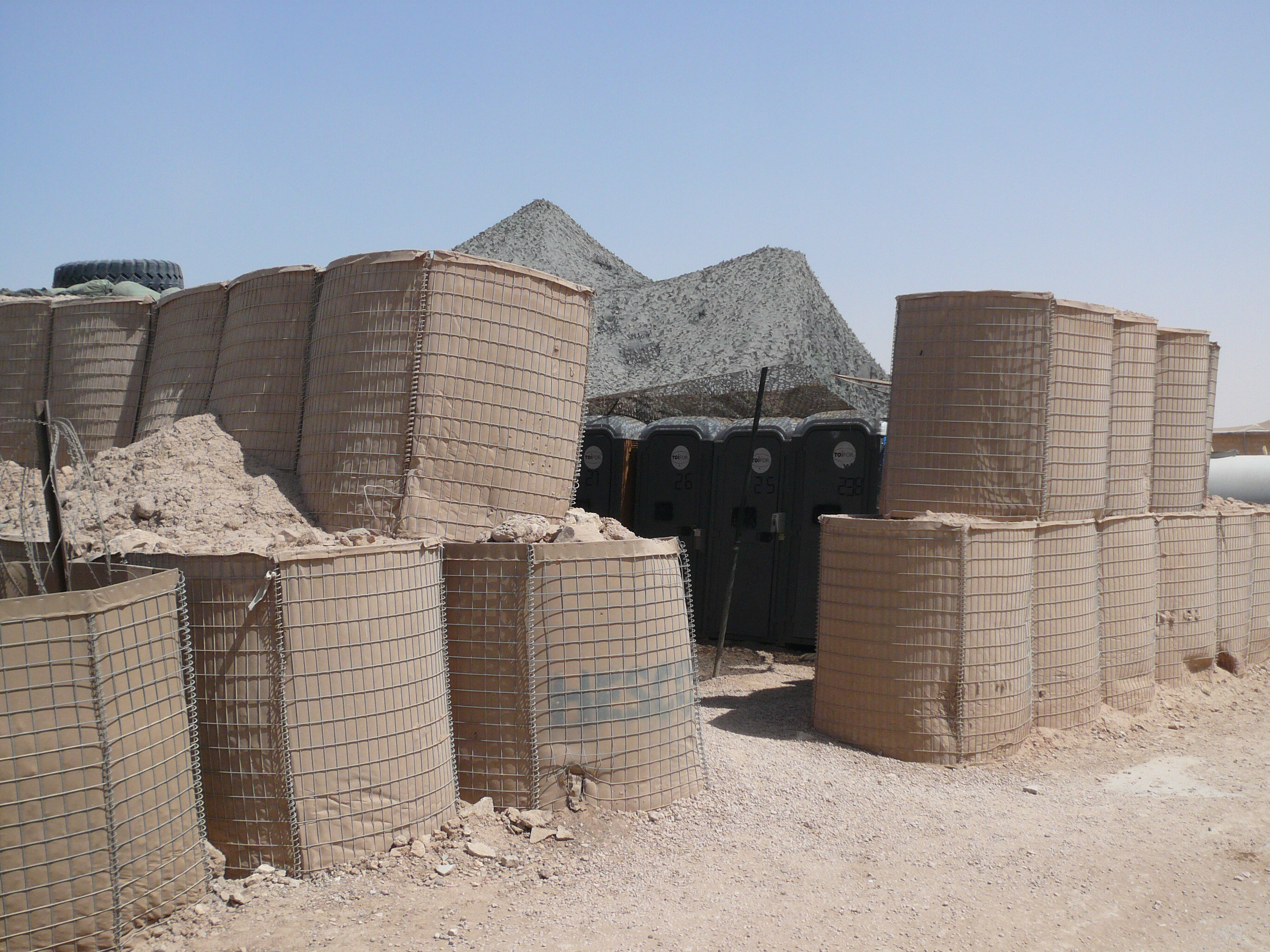
Modern Hesco bastions

=== Impact attenuation ===
Gabions may be used for attenuating dynamic loads, such as those resulting from impacts by vehicles or rockfall. Depending on what they are filled with, gabions may be highly deformable, dissipating impact forces. This has led to the use of recycled materials such as used tires and ballast from railway tracks to fill some rockfall protection embankments.

== See also ==
- Cellular confinement – Confinement system used in construction and geotechnical engineering, a small-scale mattress gabion used for roads, retaining walls, and protective structures.
- Hesco bastion – Flood control and military fortification barrier, a modernized version of the same concept
- Composite material – Material made from a combination of two or more unlike substances
- Stepped spillway – Structure for energy dissipated release of flows from a dam or levee
