= CPESC =

Qualification in erosion control

Certified Professional in Erosion and Sediment Control (CPESC) is a qualification indicating the holder has educational training, expertise and experience in controlling erosion and sedimentation, and met certification standards.

== Eligibility requirements ==
- Each applicant must successfully pass a written examination designed to determine proficiency in the principles, practices, and legislation of erosion and sediment control. Applicants must also meet one of the following requirements:
  1. Earn a BS degree or higher plus three years of professional level experience in the soil erosion and sediment control profession
  2. Complete seven years or more of professional level experience in the erosion and sediment control profession.
- Through the professional experience profile, references, and written exam, the applicant must demonstrate an ability to observe, evaluate, and synthesize information; to consider alternatives; and to propose appropriate recommendations in a clear, logical manner.
- International applicants must provide documentation to assure that educational degrees obtained and work experience are comparable to the requirements described above.
