= Erosion control =

Practice of preventing soil erosion in agriculture and land development

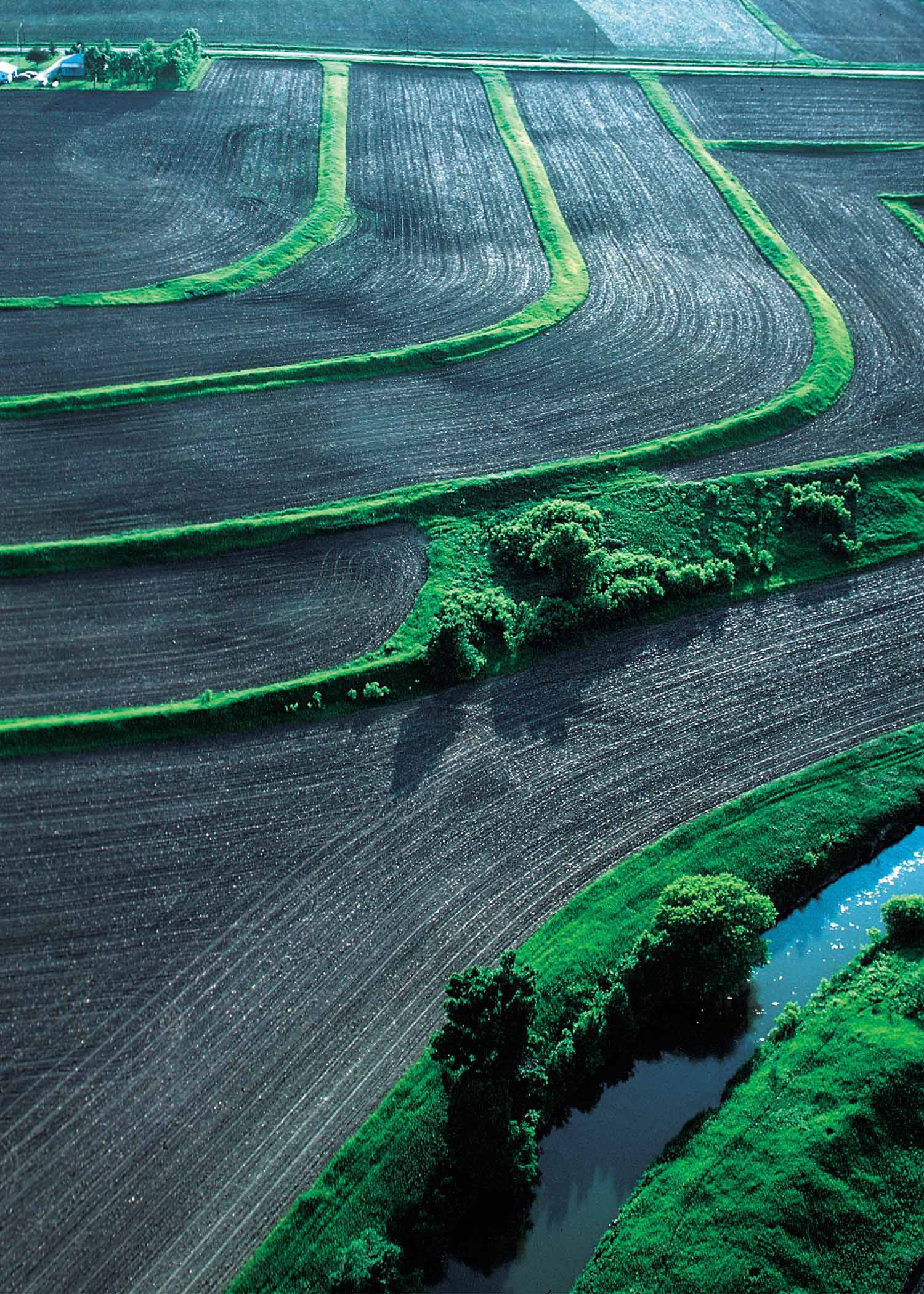
Terraces, conservation tillage, and conservation buffers save soil and improve water quality on this Iowa farm.

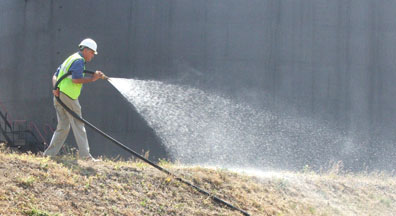
Hydroseeding in the United Kingdom

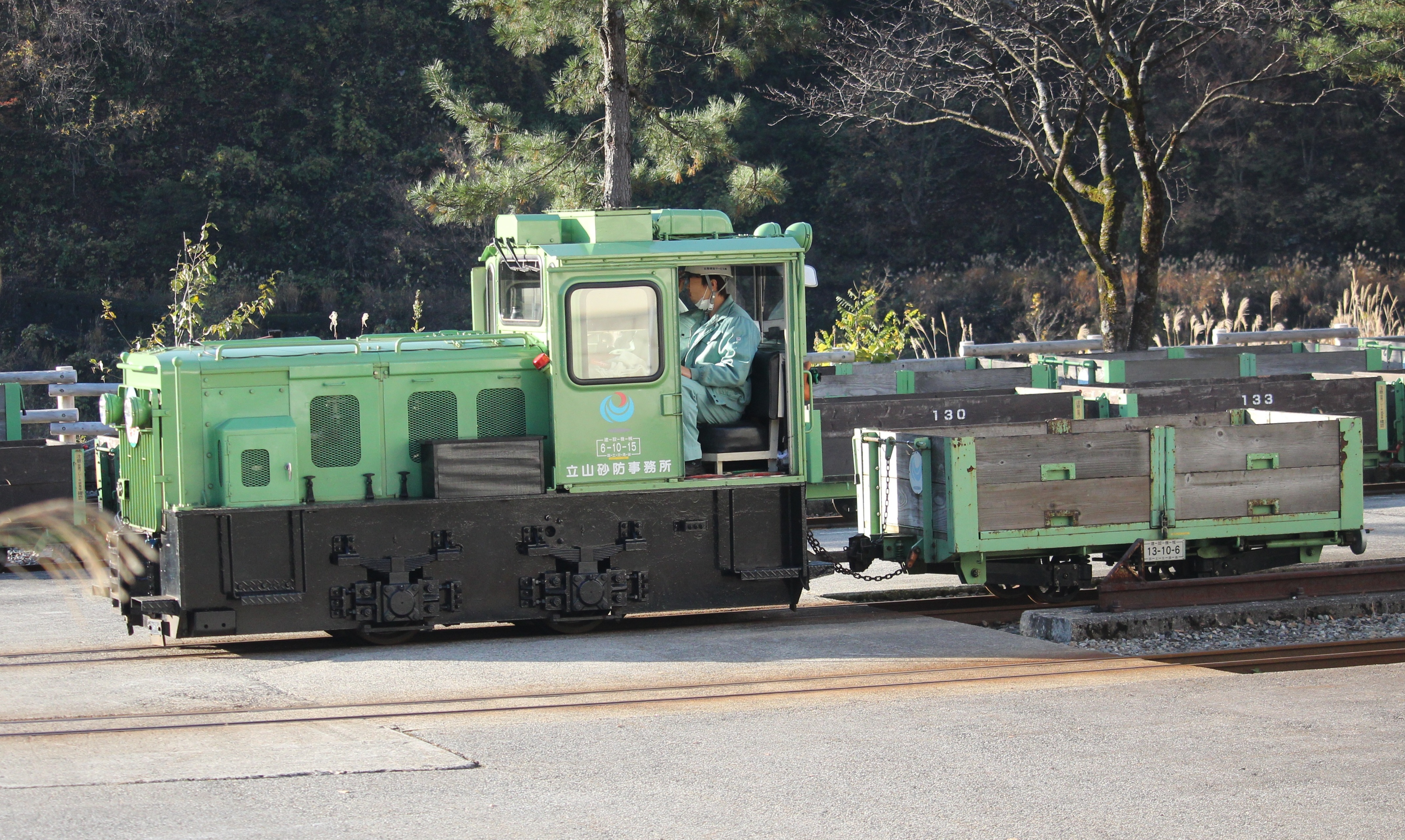
Tateyama Sabō Erosion Control Works Service Train (description page)

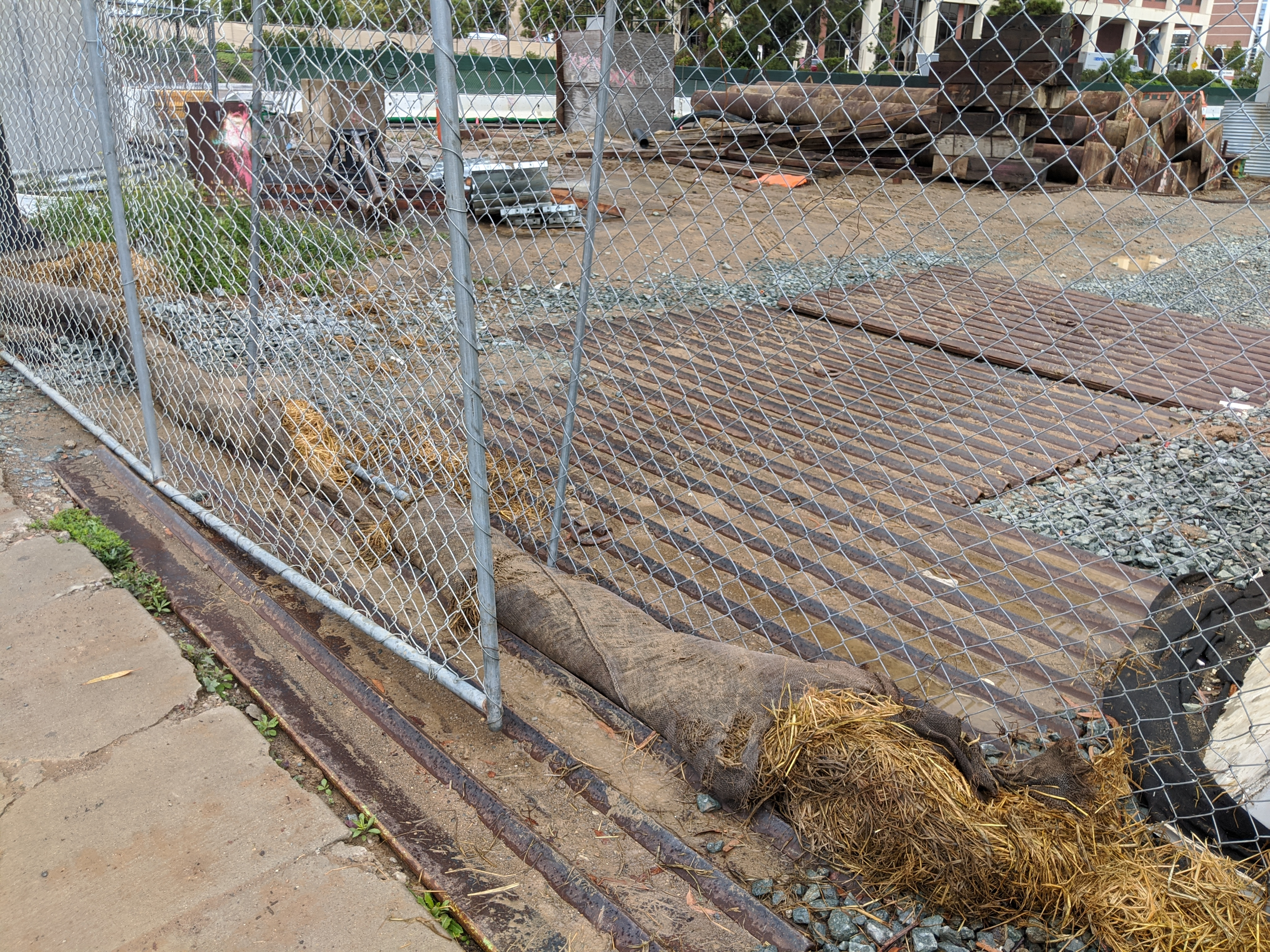
Erosion control construction entrance (description page)

Erosion control is the practice of preventing or controlling wind or water erosion in agriculture, land development, coastal areas, river banks and construction. Effective erosion controls handle surface runoff and are important techniques in preventing water pollution, soil loss, wildlife habitat loss and human property loss.

== Usage ==
Erosion controls are used in natural areas, agricultural settings or urban environments. In urban areas erosion controls are often part of stormwater runoff management programs required by local governments. The controls often involve the creation of a physical barrier, such as vegetation or rock, to absorb some of the energy of the wind or water that is causing the erosion. They also involve building and maintaining storm drains. On construction sites they are often implemented in conjunction with sediment controls such as sediment basins and silt fences.

Bank erosion is a natural process: without it, rivers would not meander and change course. However, land management patterns that change the hydrograph and/or vegetation cover can act to increase or decrease channel migration rates. In many places, whether or not the banks are unstable due to human activities, people try to keep a river in a single place. This can be done for environmental reclamation or to prevent a river from changing course into land that is being used by people. One way that this is done is by placing riprap or gabions along the bank.

== Examples ==
Examples of erosion control methods include the following:

- cellular confinement systems
- crop rotation
- conservation tillage
- contour plowing
- contour trenching
- cover crops
- Dirt Locker
- fiber rolls (also called straw wattles)
- gabions
- hydroseeding
- level spreaders
- mulching
- perennial crops
- plasticulture
- polyacrylamide (as a coagulant)
- reforestation
- riparian buffer
- riprap
- strip farming
- sand fence
- vegetated waterway (bioswale)
- terracing
- windbreaks

== Mathematical modeling ==
Since the 1920s and 1930s scientists have been creating mathematical models for understanding the mechanisms of soil erosion and resulting sediment surface runoff, including an early paper by Albert Einstein applying Baer's law. These models have addressed both gully and sheet erosion. Earliest models were a simple set of linked equations which could be employed by manual calculation. By the 1970s the models had expanded to complex computer models addressing nonpoint source pollution with thousands of lines of computer code. The more complex models were able to address nuances in micrometeorology, soil particle size distributions and micro-terrain variation.

== See also ==
- Bridge scour
- Burned area emergency response
- Certified Professional in Erosion and Sediment Control
- Coastal management
- Dust Bowl
- Natural Resources Conservation Service (United States)
- Tillage erosion
- Universal Soil Loss Equation
- Vetiver System
