= Post-fire seeding =

Wildfires consume live and dead fuels, destabilize physical and ecological landscapes, and impact human social and economic systems. Post-fire seeding was initially used to stabilize soils. More recently it is being used to recover post wildfire plant species, manage invasive non-native plant populations and establish valued vegetation compositions.

== Soil stabilization ==
=== Water erosion ===
Post fire seeding evolved from a desire to stabilize hillslope soils in hilly terrain after a wildfire and prevent downstream flooding and debris/mud flows. The assumption being supplemental seeding immediately after a wildfire would provide vegetation cover lost in the wildfire. Some of the earliest seedings were in Southern California after wildfires burned through fire prone foothills and alluvial fans developed with homes. Although recent studies confirm that the probability of flooding and debris/mud flows significantly increase following a wildfire and that rainfall intensity, burn severity and ground cover reduction accounts for most hillside erosion, post fire seeding is not the most effective treatment.

A review of 37 publications and 25 monitoring reports on soil stabilization seeding discovered that less than half showed any reduced sediment movement with seeding. Seeding was not found to be effective in increasing cover or reducing sediment yields on burned areas in the Colorado Front Range compared to controls, even for storms with return periods of less than one year. A comparison of commonly used soil stabilization treatments found that wood and straw mulch reduced water erosion rates by 60 to 80%, contour-felled log erosion barriers 50 to 70%, hydromulch 19% and grass seeding had little effect the first year during low intensity rainfall events and all were relatively ineffective in high intensity rainfall events. Vegetation cover from supplemental seeding was not significantly different from natural vegetation recovery.

=== Wind erosion ===
In arid communities post fire seeding is attempted to reduce wind erosion and deposition. There is little objective evidence that supplemental seeding is any better than natural vegetation recovery from the post fire seedbank. After the Railroad Fire in Utah, neither seeded (drilled or aerial) or unseeded areas showed significant signs of wind erosion or deposition as evidenced by little difference (<2mm) in the height of washers on erosion measurement stakes. Soil wind erosion was observed to have been moderated to some degree after the Command 24 Fire in Washington by natural site recovery alone.

== Ecological stabilization ==
Seeding especially with native seed mixes is increasingly being proposed to recover post wildfire plant species, manage invasive non-native plant populations and establish valued vegetation compositions. Compared to seeding for soil stabilization, ecosystem recovery and restoration is far more complex and take several decades to fully evaluate.

Some recent comparison studies provide early evidence on seeding’s contribution to overall post wildfire recovery. A study at Mesa Verde National Park compared seeded burned areas with unseeded burned areas and unburned areas and found that seeded burned areas had significantly less non-native plants than unseeded burned areas but significantly more than unburned areas except there was no significant difference in cheatgrass (Bromus tectorum) between seeded or unseeded burned areas. In northwestern Nevada from 1984–1997 cheatgrass density was altered by changing the seeding rates of a variety of native and non-native perennial grass and forb seed mixes. Cheatgrass densities were reduced to 2.6 plants per sq. m with seeding rates of 22.5 – 25 PLS per sq ft. Cheatgrass densities of 4.07 and 3.58 plants per sq. m were obtained with seeding rates of 10 and 35 PLS per sq. ft., respectively. On three burned areas in Colorado and New Mexico where native grass seeding was hand, drilled or aerially applied, there was a positive relationship between native species richness and non-native species cover and negative relationship between dominant native plant cover and non-native species cover. In a Utah study, all native perennial seeded plots had lower cover of annual species than unseeded plots; however, by the third year following seeding there was little change in seeded native species density, but the density of annuals more than doubled with cheatgrass and three annual forbs making up the majority of plant density. A California grassland study found that regardless of the treatment, exotic annual and native perennials were able to coexist; neither extirpated the other: exotic annuals persisted in plots to which native perennials had been added and vice versa.

It is possible that native plant seeding subsidies are not actually needed. Great Basin native big squirreltail (Elymus multisetus) appears to has evolved competitive advantage traits in the presence of cheatgrass.

== Unintended consequences ==
Some unintended consequences have been observed from post fire seeding. Seed mixes, even “certified weed free” seed mixes, have been contaminated with invasive species and initiated new infestations. Successful growth of seeded grasses (i.e., enough to affect water erosion) have displaced native or naturalized species, including shrub and tree seedlings. Seed bed preparation and the seeding process has facilitated the growth and expansion of naturalized non-native species. The machinery used in landscape seeding operations (e.g., drill seeders and chains) impact surviving native plants and disturb microbial soil crusts.

== Other factors ==
Other land management activities can affect the effectiveness of post fire seeding. Grazing seeded burned areas exacerbates the problem of non-native annual grass invasions, even when conducted after a two-year hiatus. Historic post logging seed treatments had a significant influence on the effectiveness of post Rodeo-Chediski fire seeding.
