= LSB =

LSB may refer to:

== Basketball Leagues ==
- Liga Sudamericana de Básquetbol, South America's prime international basketball league
- Liga Superior de Baloncesto, Cuba's top basketball league

== Organisations ==
- Legal Services Board, independent body responsible for overseeing the regulation of lawyers in England and Wales
- Lending Standards Board, promote fair lending and increase consumer protection in the UK; by proactively monitoring and enforcing the Standards of Lending Practice.
- Lexington State Bank, a banking company based in Lexington, North Carolina
- Local services board (Ontario), local government in the Canadian province of Ontario
- Local Station Board, the elected governing body for each of the non-commercial, listener-supported Pacifica Radio stations in the United States.
- Lån & Spar Bank, a banking company based in Copenhagen, Denmark

=== Education ===
- Lavelle School for the Blind, school in New York City
- London School Board, former local government and education
- Luxembourg School of Business, a business school in Luxembourg
- Lyceum of Subic Bay, a college in the Philippines

== Science, medicine and technology ==
- Lauryl tryptose broth, a biological selective medium
- Lower sideband, a band of frequencies in radio communications
- Long spine board, a device for casualty lifting and spine trauma prehospital care
- Low-surface-brightness galaxy, in astronomy
- Lysergic acid 2-butyl amide, a psychoactive compound related to LSD

=== Computing ===
- Least significant bit, the bit with the lowest significance in a word
- Least significant byte, the lowest byte in a multi-byte number
- Linux Standard Base, a standardisation project for Linux distributions

== Other ==
- Lenguaje de Señas Bolivianas, Bolivian Sign Language
- Lutheran Service Book, hymnal for the Lutheran Church
- Legacy Standard Bible, revision of the NASB 1995 that uses Yahweh instead of LORD
