= Water sampler =

Device for field collection of water samples

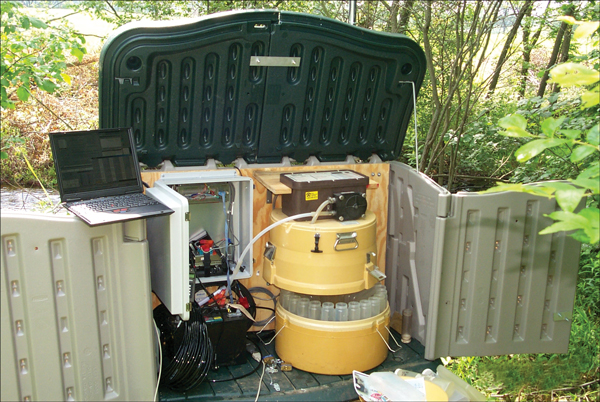
A sampling station with a 24-bottle autosampler

A water sampler is a device for field collection of one or more samples of water for testing. There are many different designs of water samplers. Selection of a particular sampler type depends on the type of analysis to be performed (e.g. ambient water quality or wastewater), the type of water source (e.g. a lake or pond, small stream or large river, coastal waters or deep ocean) and other factors such as ambient environmental conditions (e.g. collection of stormwater during a rain event vs. ambient water sampling during dry weather). Some sampler devices are designed for manual collection (a grab sample). Composite samplers can be configured to collect multiple samples over a specified time period or flow regime.

== See also ==
- Water quality § Sampling and measurement
- Environmental monitoring § Sampling methods
- Rosette sampler
