= TVCS =

TVCS may refer to:

- Torrens Valley Christian School, Hope Valley, Adelaide, South Australia, Australia
- Treasure Valley Christian School, Ontario, Oregon, USA
- The Villages Charter Schools (tvcs.org), The Villages, Sumter County, Florida, USA

== See also ==
- TVC (disambiguation) for the singular of TVCs
