= Coliform index =

Water purity rating based on fecal bacteria content

The coliform index is a rating of the purity of water based on a count of fecal bacteria. It is one of many tests done to assure sufficient water quality. Coliform bacteria are microorganisms that primarily originate in the intestines of warm-blooded animals. By testing for coliforms, especially the well known Escherichia coli (E. coli), which is a thermotolerant coliform, one can determine if the water has possibly been exposed to fecal contamination; that is, whether it has come in contact with human or animal feces. It is important to know this because many disease-causing organisms are transferred from human and animal feces to water, from where they can be ingested by people and infect them. Water that has been contaminated by feces usually contains pathogenic bacteria, which can cause disease. Some types of coliforms cause disease, but the coliform index is primarily used to judge if other types of pathogenic bacteria are likely to be present in the water.

The coliform index is used because it is difficult to test for pathogenic bacteria directly. There are many different types of disease-causing bacteria, and they are usually present in low numbers which do not always show up in tests. Thermotolerant coliforms are present in higher numbers than individual types of pathogenic bacteria and they can be tested relatively easily.

However, the coliform index is far from perfect. Thermotolerant coliforms can survive in water on their own, especially in tropical regions, so they do not always indicate fecal contamination. Furthermore, they do not give a good indication of how many pathogenic bacteria are present in the water, and they give no idea at all of whether there are pathogenic viruses or protozoa which also cause diseases and are rarely tested for. Therefore, it does not always give accurate or useful results regarding the purity of water.

== See also ==
- Bacteriological water analysis
- Indicator organism
