= TVC =

TVC may refer to:

== Television ==
- TVC News, a Nigerian television channel
- TVC Communications, a former television equipment distributor
- TVC, trade jargon for television commercial
- TVC Networks, a Mexican cable network conglomerate, parent of TVC Deportes
- Televicentro (Honduras) (TVC), a broadcasting conglomerate
- BBC Television Centre, the former headquarters of BBC Television
- Televisió de Catalunya, Catalonia's public broadcasting network
- Televisión Canaria, a Canarian television channel
- TV Centre (Russia), a Russian television network
- TV Cartoons Ltd., a former British animation studio founded by George Dunning and John Coates

== Places ==
- Cherry Capital Airport, (IATA code TVC, FAA LID code: TVC), Traverse City, Michigan, USA
- Tanana Valley Campus, UAF Community and Technical College, University of Alaska at Fairbanks; located in Tanana Valley, Fairbanks, Alaska, USA
- Thiruvananthapuram Central railway station (station code: TVC), Thampanoor, Thiruvananthapuram, Kerala, India

== Sports and games ==
- Tatsunoko vs. Capcom, a 2008 fighting videogame
- Thailand VS Challenger Series. a muaythai fighting promotion
- Tri-Valley Conference (disambiguation), several school athletics sports conferences

== Groups, organizations ==
- Traditional Values Coalition, a United States conservative Christian group
- Treasure Valuation Committee, a British government expert committee

== Other uses ==
- Thrust vector control, a method of steering aircraft and missiles
- Tinea versicolor, spots on the skin caused by yeast
- Total viable count, a measure of microorganisms
- The Vampire Chronicles, a series of novels
- Videoton TV-Computer, a Hungarian home computer made in the 1980s

== See also ==
- "TVC 15", a song by David Bowie
- TVCS (disambiguation)
