= Water testing =

Procedures used to analyze water quality

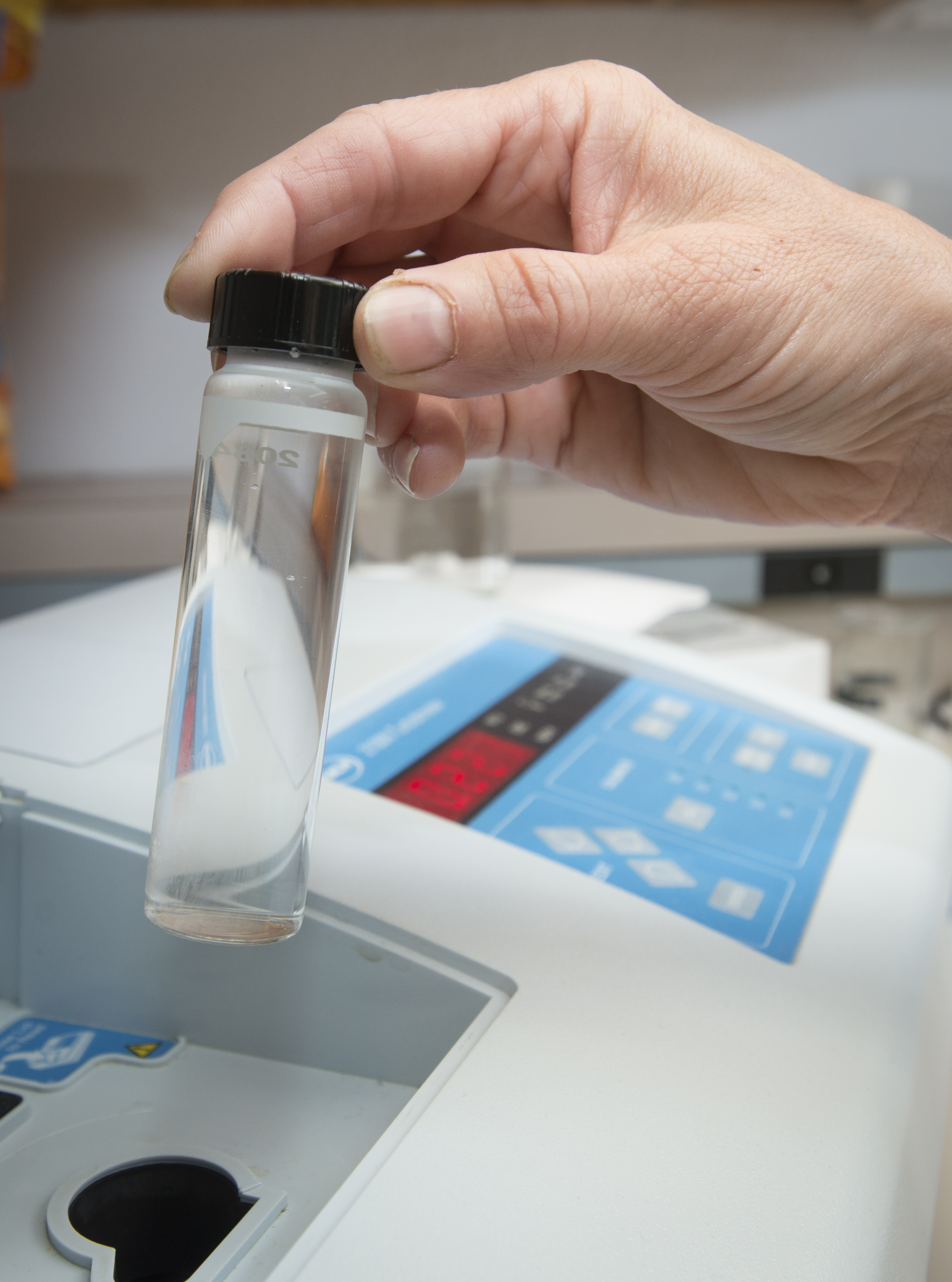
Water testing being conducted at a treatment facility in Broken Bow, Oklahoma

Water testing is a broad description for various procedures used to analyze water quality. Millions of water quality tests are carried out daily to fulfil regulatory requirements and to maintain safety.

Testing may be performed to evaluate:

- ambient or environmental water quality – the ability of a surface water body to support aquatic life as an ecosystem. See Environmental monitoring, Freshwater environmental quality parameters and Bioindicator.
- wastewater – characteristics of polluted water (domestic sewage or industrial waste) before treatment or after treatment. See Environmental chemistry and Wastewater quality indicators.
- "raw water" quality – characteristics of a water source prior to treatment for domestic consumption (drinking water). See Bacteriological water analysis and specific tests such as turbidity and hard water.
- "finished" water quality – water treated at a municipal water purification plant. See Bacteriological water analysis and Category:Water quality indicators.
- suitability of water for industrial uses such as laboratory, manufacturing or equipment cooling. See purified water.

== Government regulation ==
Government regulations related to water testing and water quality for some major countries is given below.

=== China ===
==== Ministry of Environmental Protection ====
The Ministry of Environmental Protection of the People's Republic of China is the nation's environmental protection department charged with the task of protecting China's air, water, and land from pollution and contamination. Directly under the State Council, it is empowered and required by law to implement environmental policies and enforce environmental laws and regulations. Complementing its regulatory role, it funds and organizes research and development. See Ministry of Environmental Protection of the People's Republic of China.

==== Regulatory challenges and debates ====
In late 2009, a survey was carried out by China Ministry of Housing and Urban-Rural Development to assess the water quality of urban supplies in China's cities, which revealed that "at least 1,000" water treatment plants out of more than 4,000 plants surveyed at the county level and above failed to comply with government requirements. The survey results were never formally released to the public, but in 2012, China's Century Weekly published the leaked survey data. In response, Wang Xuening, a health ministry official, released figures derived from a pilot monitoring scheme in 2011 and suggested that 80% of China's urban tap water was up to standard.

China's new drinking water standards involve 106 indicators. Of China's 35 major cities, only 40% of cities have the capacity to test for all 106 indicators. The department in charge of local water and the health administration department will enter into a discussion to determine results for more than 60 of the new measures; hence it is not required to test the water using every indicator. The grading of water quality is based on an overall average of 95% to fulfil government requirements. The frequency of water quality inspections at water treatment plants is twice yearly.

=== Pakistan ===
==== Pakistan Council of Research in Water Resources ====
Established in 1964, the Pakistan Council of Research in Water Resources aims to conduct, organize, coordinate and promote research in all aspects of water resources. As a national research organization, it undertakes and promotes applied and basic research in different disciplines of water sector.

==== Recent developments ====
In March 2013, Minister for Science and Technology Mir Changez Khan Jamali notified the National Assembly that groundwater samples collected revealed that only 15-18% samples were deemed safe for drinking both in urban and rural areas in Pakistan. The Ministry has created 24 Water Quality Testing Laboratories across Pakistan, developed and commercialized water quality test kits, water filters, water disinfection tablets and drinking water treatment sachets, conducted training for 2,660 professionals of water supply agencies and surveyed 10,000 water supply schemes out of a grand total of 12,000 schemes.

=== United Kingdom ===
==== Drinking Water Inspectorate ====
The Drinking Water Inspectorate is a section of Department for Environment, Food and Rural Affairs set up to regulate the public water supply companies in England and Wales. Water testing in England and Wales can be conducted at the environmental health office at the local authority. See Drinking Water Inspectorate.

=== United States ===
==== Environmental Protection Agency ====
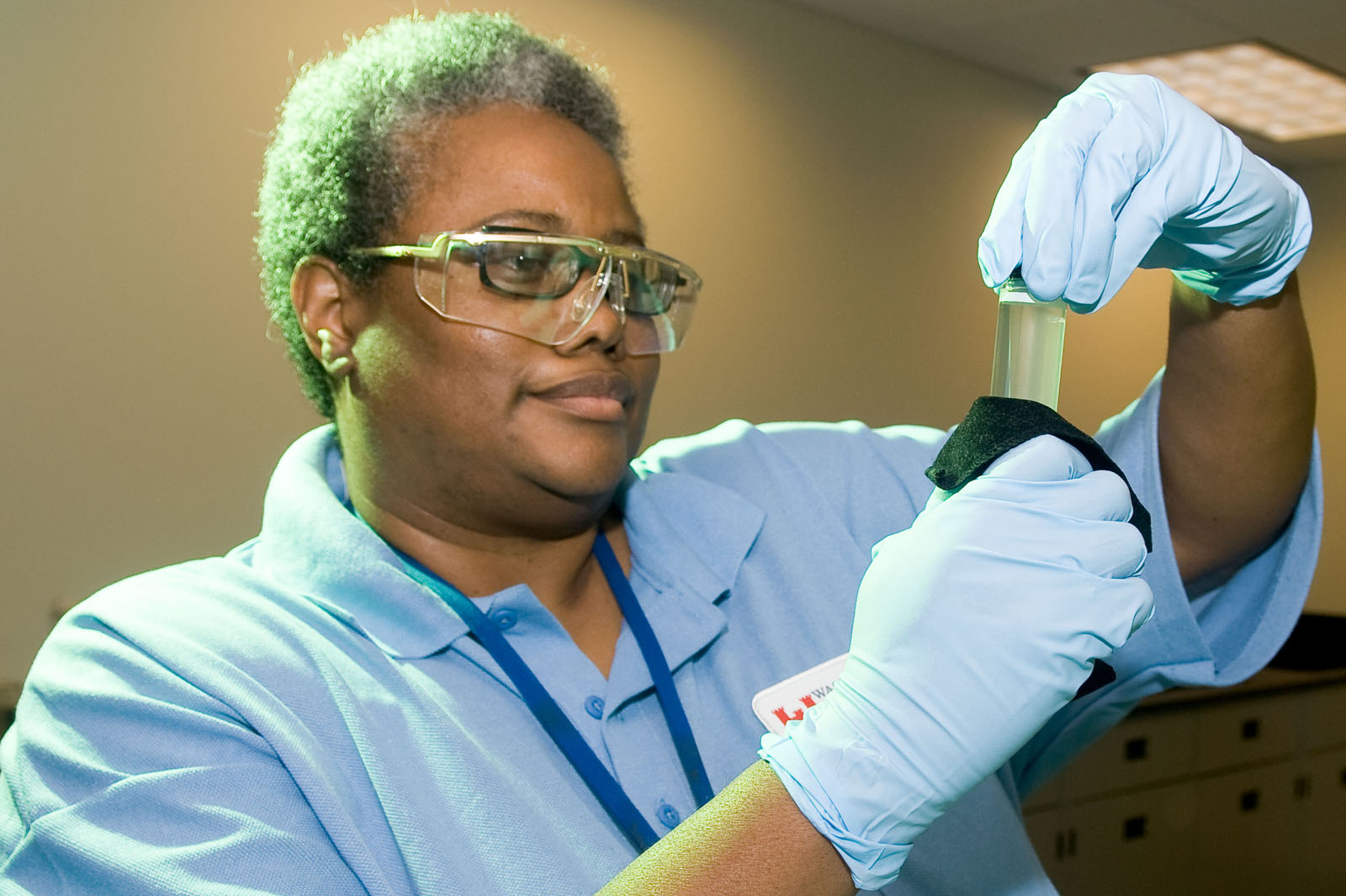
A U.S. EPA scientist inspects a water sample

The principal U.S. federal laws governing water testing are the Safe Drinking Water Act (SDWA) and the Clean Water Act. The U.S. Environmental Protection Agency (EPA) issues regulations under each law specifying analytical test methods. EPA's annual Regulatory Agenda sets a schedule for specific objectives on improving its oversight of water testing.

Drinking water analysis

Under the Safe Drinking Water Act, public water systems are required to regularly monitor their treated water for contaminants. Water samples must be analyzed using EPA-approved testing methods, by laboratories that are certified by EPA or a state agency.

The 2013 revised Total Coliform Rule and the 1989 Total Coliform Rule are the only microbial drinking water regulations that apply to all public water systems. The revised rule highlights the frequency and timing of microbial testing by water systems based on population served, system type, and source water type. It also places a legal limit on the level for Escherichia coli. Potential health threats must be disclosed to EPA or the appropriate state agency, and public notification is required in some circumstances.

Methods for measuring acute toxicity usually take between 24 and 96 hours to identify contaminants in water supplies.

Wastewater analysis

All facilities in the United States that discharge wastewater to surface waters (e.g. rivers, lakes or coastal waters) must obtain a permit under the National Pollutant Discharge Elimination System, a Clean Water Act program administered by EPA and state agencies. The facilities covered include sewage treatment plants, industrial and commercial plants, military bases and other facilities. Most permittees are required to regularly collect wastewater samples and analyze them for compliance with permit requirements, and report the results either to EPA or the state agency.

==== Private wells ====
Private wells are not regulated by the federal government. In general, private well owners are responsible for testing their wells. Some state or local governments regulate well construction and may require well testing. Generally well testing required by local governments is limited to a handful of contaminants including coliform and E. Coli bacteria and perhaps a few predominant local contaminants such as nitrates or arsenic. EPA publishes test methods for contaminants that it regulates under the SDWA.

==== Publication of test methods ====
Peer-reviewed test methods have been published by government agencies, private research organizations and international standards organizations for ambient water, wastewater and drinking water. Approved published methods must be used when testing to demonstrate compliance with regulatory requirements.

==== Homeland security ====
The Homeland Security Presidential Directive 7 (HSPD-7), issued December 7, 2003 by the United States Department of Homeland Security (DHS), designated EPA as the sector-specific agency for the water sector's critical infrastructure protection activities. HSPD-7 was replaced by Presidential Policy Directive 21 (PPD-21) on February 12, 2013. All EPA activities related to water security are carried out in consultation with DHS. Possible threats to water quality include contamination with deadly agents, such as cyanide, and physical attacks such as the release of toxic gaseous chemicals.

==== Regulatory challenges and debates ====
===== Hydraulic fracturing =====
The Energy Policy Act of 2005 created a loophole that exempts companies drilling for natural gas from disclosing the chemicals involved in fracturing operations that would normally be required under federal clean water laws. The loophole is commonly known as the "Halliburton loophole" because Dick Cheney, the former chief executive officer of Halliburton, was reportedly instrumental in its passage. Although the Safe Drinking Water Act excludes hydraulic fracturing from the Underground Injection Control regulations, the use of diesel fuel during hydraulic fracturing is still regulated. State oil and gas agencies may issue additional regulations for hydraulic fracturing. States or EPA have the authority under the Clean Water Act to regulate discharge of produced waters from hydraulic fracturing operations.

In December 2011, federal environment officials scientifically linked underground water pollution with hydraulic fracturing for the first time in central Wyoming. EPA stated that the water supply contained at least 10 compounds known to be used in fracking fluids. The findings in the report contradicted arguments by the drilling industry on the safety of the fracturing process, such as the hydrologic pressure that naturally forces fluids downwards instead of upwards. EPA also commented that the pollution from 33 abandoned oil and gas waste pits were responsible for some degree of minor groundwater pollution in the vicinity.

In February 2013, the state of Illinois introduced the Illinois Hydraulic Fracturing Regulatory Act, H.B. 2615, which imposes strict controls on fracturing companies, such as chemical disclosure requirements and water testing requirements. The bill includes baseline and periodic post-frack testing of potentially affected waters, such as surface water and groundwater sources near fracturing wells, to identify contamination associated with hydraulic fracturing. Fracturing wells will be closed if fracturing fluid is released outside of the shale rock formation being fractured.

===== Pharmaceuticals and personal care products =====
Detectable levels of pharmaceuticals and personal care products, in the parts per trillion, are found in many public drinking water systems in the US as many water testing plants lack the technological know-how to remove these chemical compounds from raw water. There are now increasing worries about how these compounds degrade and react in the environment, during the treatment process, inside our bodies, and the long-term exposure to multiple contaminants at low levels. Out of over 80,000 chemicals registered with the EPA, the US federal drinking water rules mandate testing for only 83 chemicals, which calls for increased monitoring of pharmaceuticals on the presence and concentrations of chemical compounds in rivers, streams, and treated tap water. As traditional waste water regulations and treatment systems target microorganisms and nutrients, there are no federal standards for pharmaceuticals in drinking water or waste water.

==== Recent developments ====
In May 2012, the Environmental Protection Agency released a new list of contaminants, known as the unregulated contaminant monitoring regulation 3 (UCMR3), that will be part of municipal water systems testing starting this year and continuing through 2015. The UCMR3 testing will help municipal water system operators measure the occurrence and exposure of contamination levels that may endanger human health. The State Hygienic Laboratory at the University of Iowa is the only state environmental public health laboratory that has been certified and approved to test for all 28 chemical contaminants on the new list.

In March 2013, the Environmental Protection Agency developed a new rapid water quality test that provides accurate same day results of contamination levels, which marks a significant improvement from current tests that require at least 24 hours to obtain results. The new test will help authorities determine whether beaches are safe for swimming to keep the public from falling sick and could help prevent beaches from being closed.

=== International organizations ===
The International Maritime Organization, known as the Inter-Governmental Maritime Consultative Organization until 1982, was established in Geneva in 1948, and came into force ten years later, meeting for the first time in 1959. See International Maritime Organization.

The International Maritime Organization has been at the forefront of the international community by taking the lead in addressing the transfer of aquatic invasive species through shipping. On 13 February 2004, the International Convention for the Control and Management of Ships' Ballast Water and Sediments was adopted by consensus at a diplomatic conference held at the International Maritime Organization headquarters in London. According to the convention, all ships are required to implement a ballast water and sediments management plan. All ships will have to carry a Ballast Water Record Book and will be required to carry out ballast water management procedures to a given standard. Parties to the convention are given the option to take additional measures which are subject to criteria set out in the Convention and to International Maritime Organization guidelines. Ballast water management is subjected to the ballast water exchange standard and the ballast water performance standard. Ships performing ballast water exchange shall do so with an efficiency of 95 per cent volumetric exchange of ballast water and ships using a ballast water management system (BWMS) shall meet a performance standard based on agreed numbers of organisms per unit of volume. The convention will enter into force 12 months after ratification by 30 States, representing 35 per cent of world merchant shipping tonnage. See Ballast water discharge and the environment.

== Water test initiatives ==
=== EarthEcho Water Challenge ===
The [[World Water Monitoring Day|EarthEcho Water Challenge]] is an international education and outreach program that generates public awareness and involvement in safeguarding water resources globally by engaging citizens to conduct water testing of local water bodies. Participants learn how to conduct simple water quality tests, analyze common indicators of water health, specifically dissolved oxygen, pH, temperature, and turbidity. The program was originally called "World Water Monitoring Day" and later "World Water Monitoring Challenge", and was established in 2003. EarthEcho International encourages participants to conduct their monitoring activities as part of the "EarthEcho Water Challenge" during any period between March 22 (World Water Day) and December of each year.

== Water test market ==
=== Market size and structure ===
As of 2009, the global water test market, which includes in-house, small commercial and large laboratory groups, is approximately US$3.6 billion. The global market for low-end test equipment is roughly $300–400 million. The global market for in-line monitors is approximately $100–130 million.

=== Product offering ===
Key products include analytical systems, instrumentation, and reagents for water quality and safety analysis. Reagents are chemical testing compounds that identify presence of chlorine, pH, alkalinity, turbidity and other metrics.

The equipment market comprises low-end, onsite field testing equipment, in-line monitors, and high-end testing laboratory instruments. High-end lab equipment are Mass Spectrometry devices that conduct organic analysis, using Gas Chromatography and Liquid Chromatography, or metals analysis, using Inductively Coupled Plasma.

==== New developments ====
Several trends to monitor include digital sensor plug-and-play techniques and luminescent dissolved oxygen meters replacing sensors.

=== "Razor and Razor-blade" business model ===
The water test market is approximately two-thirds equipment and one-third consumables. Reagents are used with each test and generate recurring revenue for companies. Aftermarket maintenance agreements, operator training and parts replacement help to ensure resources are maximized. The market leader with an estimated 21% market share, Danaher, is able to reap EBIT margins in the high-teens-to-low-20% on test equipment, but can command 40%+ margins on the water test reagents. See Freebie marketing.

=== Distribution ===
Companies tend to employ the "direct-to-end-user" model for most products, but may also try to sell low-end equipment via the Internet to reduce distribution costs.

=== Pricing ===
Pricing depends on application and type of product. Instruments range from as low as $10 to thousands of dollars.

=== Suppliers ===
The low-end test equipment is dominated by few large suppliers, notably Germany's Loviband and Merck, DelAgua & ITS Europe Water Testing of the UK who work globally, and US-based LaMotte. Major manufacturers of in-line equipment include Siemens and Danaher's Hach. Thermo Scientific and Waters are key producers of high-end test equipment.

=== End markets ===
The end markets include municipal water plants, industrial users, such as beverage and electronics, and environmental agencies, such as the United States Geological Survey.

== Water testing facilities ==
There are two main types of laboratories: commercial and in-house.

=== In-house laboratories ===
In-house laboratories are usually present in municipal water and waste water facilities, breweries and pharmaceutical manufacturing plants. They account for roughly half of all tests run annually.

=== Commercial laboratories ===
Most of the commercial laboratories are single-site firms that only service institutions in the geographical region. The employee head count for each laboratory is usually fewer than five people, and revenues are under $1 million. These laboratories account for one quarter of all tests. There are several major laboratory groups, such as UK-based Inspicio and Australia-based ALS, which account for another quarter of all tests.

== See also ==
- List of chemical analysis methods
- Water chemistry analysis
- Water quality: measurement
