= Endo agar =

Culture medium used in microbiology

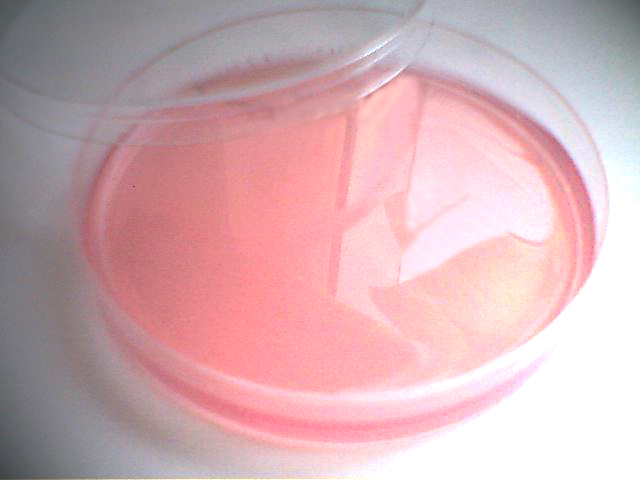
Endo agar

Endo agar (also called Endo's medium) is a microbiological growth medium with a faint pink colour. Originally developed for the isolation of Salmonella typhi, it is now used mostly as a coliform medium. Most gram-negative organisms grow well in this medium, while growth of gram-positive organisms is inhibited. Coliform organisms ferment the lactose in this medium, producing a green metallic sheen (i.e. Escherichia coli), whereas non-lactose-fermenting organisms produce clear, colourless colonies, i.e. Salmonella species.

== Typical composition ==
Endo agar typically contains (w/v):

- 1.0 % peptone
- 0.25 % dipotassium hydrogen phosphate (K_{2}HPO_{4})
- 1.0 % lactose
- 0.33 % anhydrous sodium sulfite (Na_{2}SO_{3})
- 0.03 % fuchsine
- 1.25 % agar
