= Water quality =

Assessment against standards for use

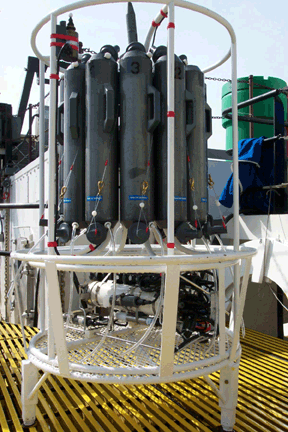
A rosette sampler is used for collecting water samples in deep water, such as the Great Lakes or oceans, for water quality testing.

Water quality refers to the chemical, physical, and biological characteristics of water based on the standards of its usage. It is most frequently used by reference to a set of standards against which compliance, generally achieved through treatment of the water, can be assessed. The most common standards used to monitor and assess water quality convey the health of ecosystems, safety of human contact, extent of water pollution and condition of drinking water. Water quality has a significant impact on water supply and often determines supply options.

== Impacts on public health ==
Over time, there has been increasing recognition of the importance of drinking water quality and its impact on public health. This has led to increasing protection and management of water quality.

The understanding of the links between water quality and health continues to grow and highlight new potential health crises: from the chronic impacts of infectious diseases on child development through stunting to new evidence on the harms from known contaminants, such as manganese with growing evidence of neurotoxicity in children. In addition, there are many emerging water quality issues—such as microplastics, perfluorinated compounds, and antimicrobial resistance.

== Categories of Water quality ==
The parameters for water quality are determined by the intended use. Work in the area of water quality tends to be focused on water that is treated for potability, industrial/domestic use, or restoration (of an environment/ecosystem, generally for health of human/aquatic life).

=== Human consumption ===
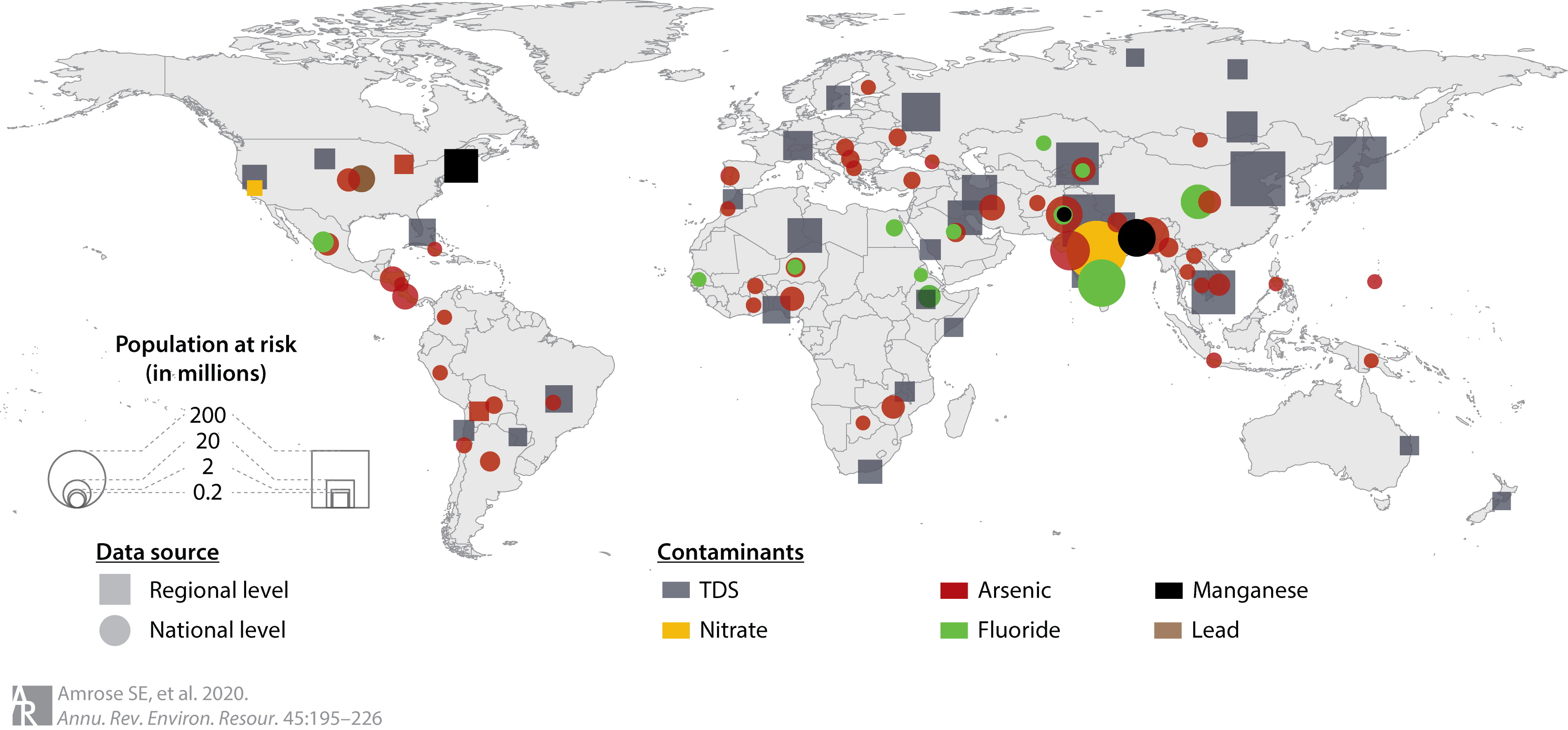
Regional and national contamination of drinking water by chemical type and population size at risk of exposure

Contaminants that may be in untreated water include microorganisms such as viruses, protozoa and bacteria; inorganic contaminants such as salts and metals; organic chemical contaminants from industrial processes and petroleum use; pesticides and herbicides; and radioactive contaminants. Water quality depends on the local geology and ecosystem, as well as human uses such as sewage dispersion, industrial pollution, use of water bodies as a heat sink, and overuse (which may lower the level of the water).

The United States Environmental Protection Agency (EPA) limits the amounts of certain contaminants in tap water provided by US public water systems. The Safe Drinking Water Act authorizes EPA to issue two types of standards:

- primary standards regulate substances that potentially affect human health;
- secondary standards prescribe aesthetic qualities, those that affect taste, odor, or appearance.

The U.S. Food and Drug Administration (FDA) regulations establish limits for contaminants in bottled water. Drinking water, including bottled water, may reasonably be expected to contain at least small amounts of some contaminants. The presence of these contaminants does not necessarily indicate that the water poses a health risk.

In urbanized areas around the world, water purification technology is used in municipal water systems to remove contaminants from the source water (surface water or groundwater) before it is distributed to homes, businesses, schools and other recipients. Water drawn directly from a stream, lake, or aquifer that has no treatment will be of uncertain quality in terms of potability.

The burden of polluted drinking water disproportionally effects under-represented and vulnerable populations. Communities that lack these clean drinking-water services are at risk of contracting water-borne and pollution-related illnesses like Cholera, diarrhea, dysentery, hepatitis A, typhoid, and polio. These communities are often in low-income areas, where human wastewater is discharged into a nearby drainage channel or surface water drain without sufficient treatment, or is used in agricultural irrigation.

=== Industrial and domestic use ===
Dissolved ions may affect the suitability of water for a range of industrial and domestic purposes. The most familiar of these is probably the presence of calcium (Ca^{2+}) and magnesium (Mg^{2+}) that interfere with the cleaning action of soap, and can form hard sulfate and soft carbonate deposits in water heaters or boilers. Hard water may be softened to remove these ions. The softening process often substitutes sodium cations. For certain populations, hard water may be preferable to soft water because health problems have been associated with calcium deficiencies and with excess sodium. The necessity for additional calcium and magnesium in water depends on the population in question because people generally satisfy their recommended amounts through food.

=== Environmental water quality ===
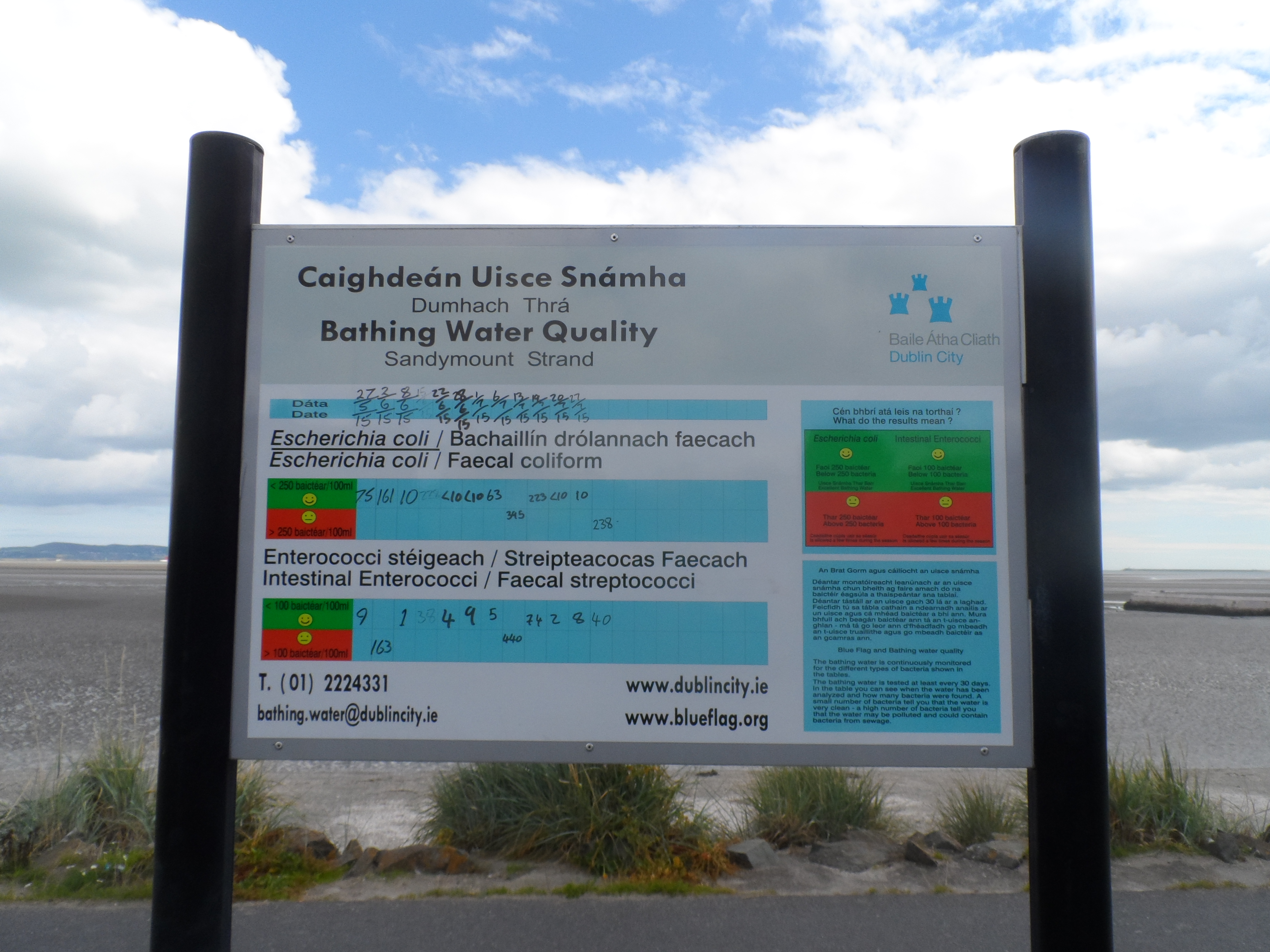
Sign in Sandymount, Ireland, describing water quality, giving levels of faecal coliform E. coli and Enterococcus faecalis

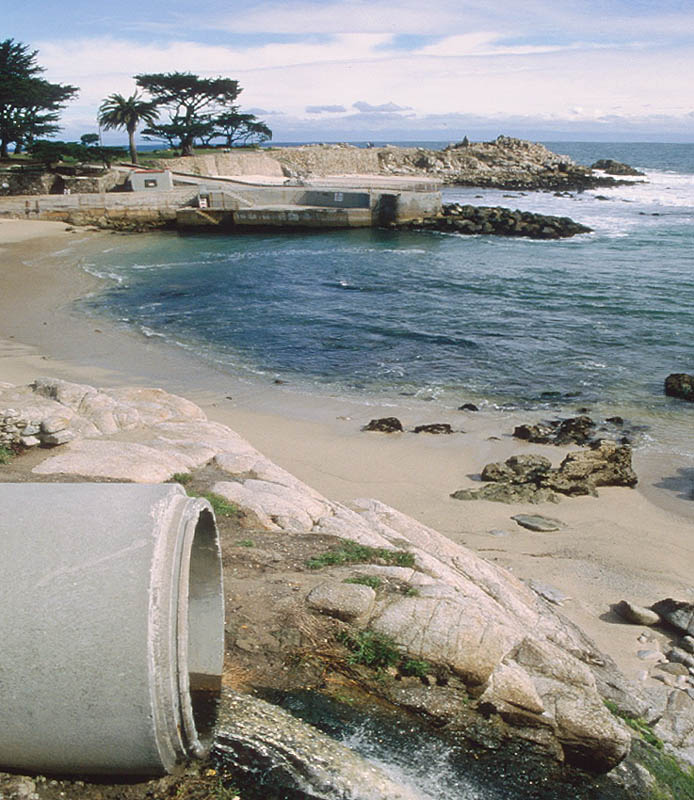
Urban runoff discharging to coastal waters

Environmental water quality, also called ambient water quality, relates to water bodies such as lakes, rivers, and oceans. Water quality standards for surface waters vary significantly due to different environmental conditions, ecosystems, and intended human uses. Toxic substances and high populations of certain microorganisms can present a health hazard for non-drinking purposes such as irrigation, swimming, fishing, rafting, boating, and industrial uses. These conditions may also affect wildlife, which use the water for drinking or as a habitat. According to the EPA, water quality laws generally specify protection of fisheries and recreational use and require, as a minimum, retention of current quality standards. In some locations, desired water quality conditions include high dissolved oxygen concentrations, low chlorophyll-a concentrations, high water clarity, and low water temperature.

There is some desire among the public to return water bodies to pristine, or pre-industrial conditions. Most current environmental laws focus on the designation of particular uses of a water body. In some countries these designations allow for some water contamination as long as the particular type of contamination is not harmful to the designated uses. Given the landscape changes (e.g., land development, urbanization, clearcutting in forested areas) in the watersheds of many freshwater bodies, returning to pristine conditions would be a significant challenge. In these cases, environmental scientists focus on achieving goals for maintaining healthy ecosystems and may concentrate on the protection of populations of endangered species and protecting human health.

Regulatory or grading systems related to water quality for bathing include the British Bathing Water Regulations 2013, the European Bathing Waters Directive 2006, and the international Blue Flag Beach scheme.

== Sampling and measurement ==
=== Sample collection ===
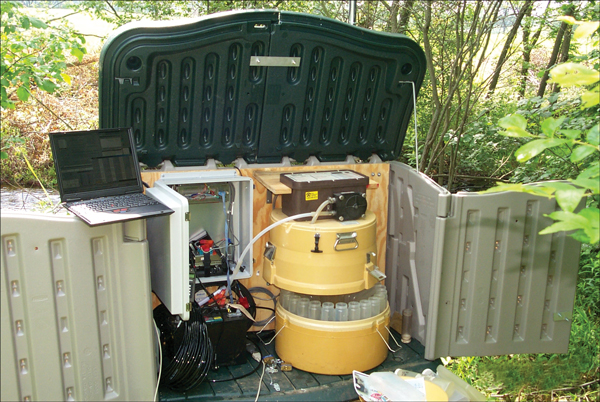
An automated sampling station installed along the East Branch Milwaukee River, New Fane, Wisconsin. The cover of the 24-bottle autosampler (center) is partially raised, showing the sample bottles inside. The autosampler collects samples at time intervals, or proportionate to flow over a specified period. The data logger (white cabinet) records temperature, specific conductance, and dissolved oxygen levels.

The complexity of water quality as a subject is reflected in the many types of measurements of water quality indicators. Some measurements of water quality are most accurately made on-site, because water exists in equilibrium with its surroundings. Measurements commonly made on-site and in direct contact with the water source in question include temperature, pH, dissolved oxygen, conductivity, oxygen reduction potential (ORP), turbidity, and Secchi disk depth.

Sampling of water for physical or chemical testing can be done by several methods, depending on the accuracy needed and the characteristics of the contaminant. Sampling methods include for example simple random sampling, stratified sampling, systematic and grid sampling, adaptive cluster sampling, grab samples, semi-continuous monitoring and continuous, passive sampling, remote surveillance, remote sensing, and biomonitoring. The use of passive samplers greatly reduces the cost and the need of infrastructure on the sampling location.

Many contamination events are sharply restricted in time, most commonly in association with rain events. For this reason "grab" samples are often inadequate for fully quantifying contaminant levels. Scientists gathering this type of data often employ auto-sampler devices that pump increments of water at either time or discharge intervals.

More complex measurements are often made in a laboratory requiring a water sample to be collected, preserved, transported, and analyzed at another location.

==== Issues ====
The process of water sampling introduces two significant problems: the extent to which the sample may be representative of the water source of interest, and the fact that as soon as the sample is removed from the water source, it begins to establish chemical equilibrium with its new surroundings.

Water sources vary with time and with location, and the measurement of interest may vary seasonally or from day to night or in response to some activity of man or natural populations of aquatic plants and animals. The measurement of interest may vary with distances from the water boundary with overlying atmosphere and underlying or confining soil. The sampler must determine if a single time and location meets the needs of the investigation, or if the water use of interest can be satisfactorily assessed by averaged values of sampling over time and location, or if critical maxima and minima require individual measurements over a range of times, locations or events. The sample collection procedure must assure correct weighting of individual sampling times and locations where averaging is appropriate. Where critical maximum or minimum values exist, statistical methods must be applied to observed variation to determine an adequate number of samples to assess the probability of exceeding those critical values.

With regards to the second problem, to prevent reactions in the sample after it has been taken, sample containers must be made of materials with minimal reactivity with the substances to be measured, and pre-cleaning of sample containers is important. The water sample may dissolve part of the sample container and any residue on that container, and chemicals dissolved in the water sample may sorb onto the sample container and remain there when the water is poured out for analysis. Similar physical and chemical interactions may take place with any pumps, piping, or intermediate devices used to transfer the water sample into the sample container or perform testing.

Similarly, ongoing chemical processes may continue after a sample is taken - for example, microorganisms within the water sample may biochemically alter concentrations of oxygen, carbon dioxide, and organic compounds. Changing carbon dioxide concentrations may alter pH, for example due to exposure to the atmosphere, could have impacts on the solubility and chemical equilibrium of chemicals of interest. Since many environmentally relevant chemicals act as Lewis acids and bases, by the isohydric principle, pH can act as a 'master variable' of water quality, so the pH of samples needs to be maintained or accounted for. Other chemical reaction equilibria may change if the water sample changes temperature, another such 'master variable'. These problems are of special concern during measurement of chemicals assumed to be significant at very low concentrations Physical processes such as phase separation may also occur after a sample is collected. Water collected from depths below the surface will normally be held at the reduced pressure of the atmosphere; so gas dissolved in the water will collect at the top of the container. Atmospheric gas above the water may also dissolve into the water sample. Finely divided solid particles formerly suspended by water turbulence may settle to the bottom of the sample container, or a solid phase may form from biological growth or chemical precipitation. .

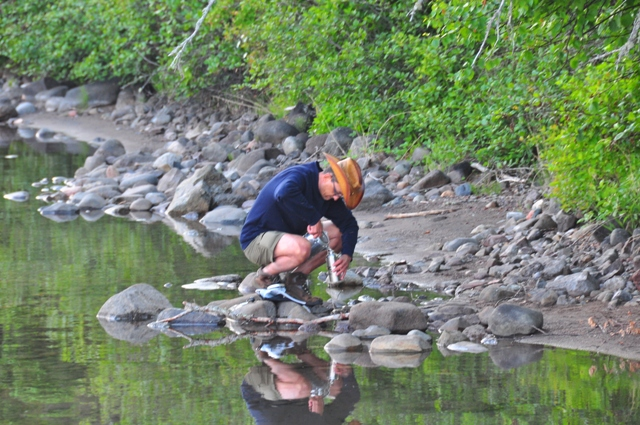
Filtering a manually collected water sample (grab sample) for analysis

Sample preservation may partially resolve the second problem. A common procedure is keeping samples cold to slow the rate of chemical reactions and phase change, and analyzing the sample as soon as possible; but this merely minimizes the changes rather than preventing them. A useful procedure for determining influence of sample containers during delay between sample collection and analysis involves preparation for two artificial samples in advance of the sampling event. One sample container is filled with water known from previous analysis to contain no detectable amount of the chemical of interest. This sample, called a "blank", is opened for exposure to the atmosphere when the sample of interest is collected, then resealed and transported to the laboratory with the sample for analysis to determine if sample collection or holding procedures introduced any measurable amount of the chemical of interest. The second artificial sample is collected with the sample of interest, but then "spiked" with a measured additional amount of the chemical of interest at the time of collection. The blank (negative control) and spiked sample (positive control) are carried with the sample of interest and analyzed by the same methods at the same times to determine any changes indicating gains or losses during the elapsed time between collection and analysis.

=== Testing in response to natural disasters and other emergencies ===
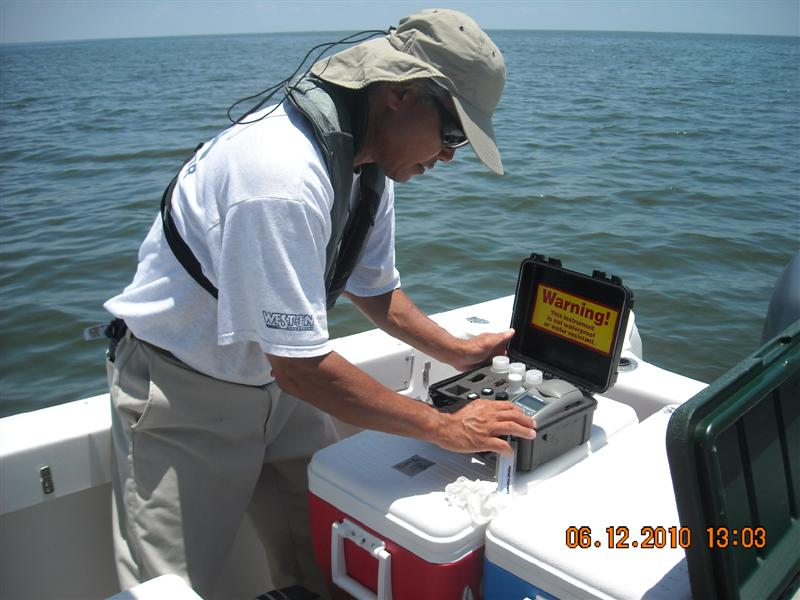
Testing water in the Gulf of Mexico after the Deepwater Horizon oil spill

After events such as earthquakes and tsunamis, there is an immediate response by the aid agencies as relief operations get underway to try and restore basic infrastructure and provide the basic fundamental items that are necessary for survival and subsequent recovery. The threat of disease increases hugely due to the large numbers of people living close together, often in squalid conditions, and without proper sanitation.

After a natural disaster, as far as water quality testing is concerned, there are widespread views on the best course of action to take and a variety of methods can be employed. The key basic water quality parameters that need to be addressed in an emergency are bacteriological indicators of fecal contamination, free chlorine residual, pH, turbidity and possibly conductivity/total dissolved solids. There are many decontamination methods.

After major natural disasters, a considerable length of time might pass before water quality returns to pre-disaster levels. For example, following the 2004 Indian Ocean tsunami the Colombo-based International Water Management Institute (IWMI) monitored the effects of saltwater and concluded that the wells recovered to pre-tsunami drinking water quality one and a half years after the event. IWMI developed protocols for cleaning wells contaminated by saltwater; these were subsequently officially endorsed by the World Health Organization as part of its series of Emergency Guidelines.

=== Chemical analysis ===
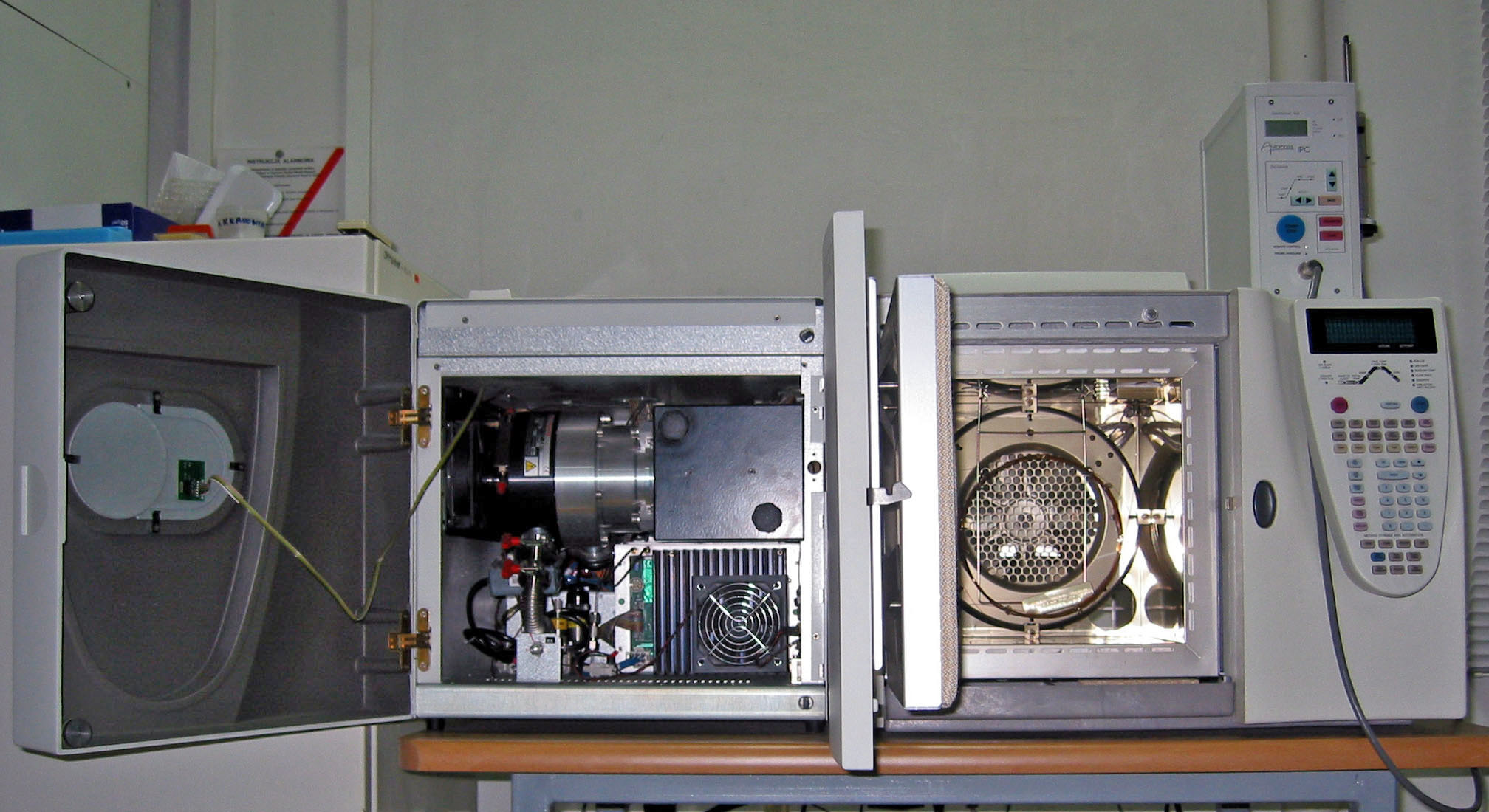
A gas chromatograph- mass spectrometer measures pesticides and other organic pollutants.

The simplest methods of chemical analysis are those measuring chemical elements without respect to their form. Elemental analysis for oxygen, as an example, would indicate a concentration of 890 g/L (grams per litre) of water sample because oxygen (O) has 89% mass of the water molecule (H_{2}O). The method selected to measure dissolved oxygen should differentiate between diatomic oxygen and oxygen combined with other elements. The comparative simplicity of elemental analysis has produced a large amount of sample data and water quality criteria for elements sometimes identified as heavy metals. Water analysis for heavy metals must consider soil particles suspended in the water sample. These suspended soil particles may contain measurable amounts of metal. Although the particles are not dissolved in the water, they may be consumed by people drinking the water. Adding acid to a water sample to prevent loss of dissolved metals onto the sample container may dissolve more metals from suspended soil particles. Filtration of soil particles from the water sample before acid addition, however, may cause loss of dissolved metals onto the filter. The complexities of differentiating similar organic molecules are even more challenging.

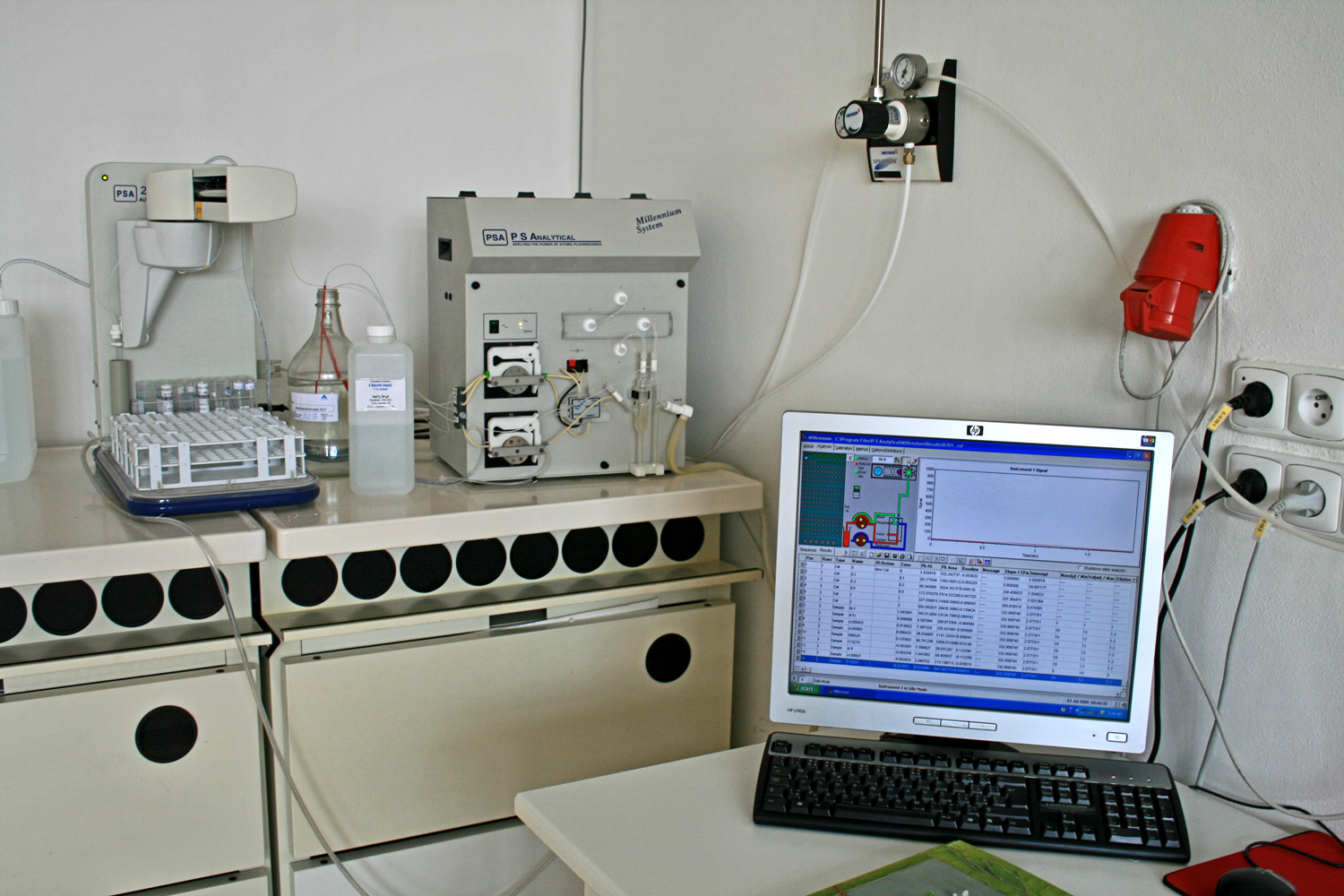
Atomic fluorescence spectroscopy is used to measure mercury and other heavy metals.

Making these complex measurements can be expensive. Because direct measurements of water quality can be expensive, ongoing monitoring programs are typically conducted and results released by government agencies. However, there are local volunteer programs and resources available for some general assessment. Tools available to the general public include on-site test kits, commonly used for home fish tanks, and biological assessment procedures.

=== Biosensors ===
Biosensors have the potential for "high sensitivity, selectivity, reliability, simplicity, low-cost and real-time response". For instance, bionanotechnologists reported the development of ROSALIND 2.0, that can detect levels of diverse water pollutants.

=== Real-time monitoring ===
Although water quality is usually sampled and analyzed at laboratories, since the late 20th century there has been increasing public interest in the quality of drinking water provided by municipal systems. Many water utilities have developed systems to collect real-time data about source water quality. In the early 21st century, a variety of sensors and remote monitoring systems have been deployed for measuring water pH, turbidity, dissolved oxygen and other parameters. Some remote sensing systems have also been developed for monitoring ambient water quality in riverine, estuarine and coastal water bodies.

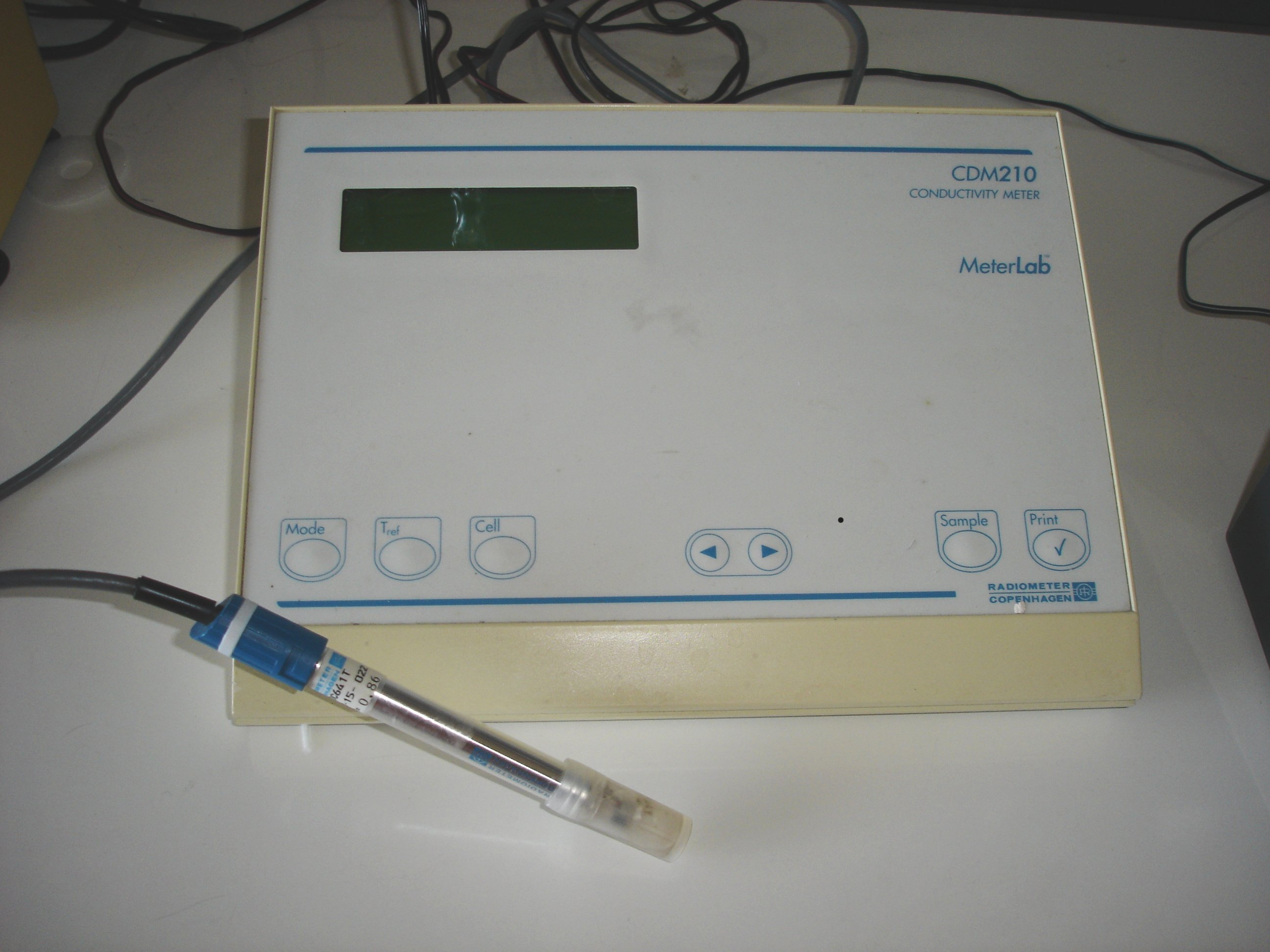
An electrical conductivity meter is used to measure total dissolved solids.

The following is a list of indicators often measured by situational category:

- Alkalinity
- Color of water
- pH
- Taste and odor (geosmin, 2-Methylisoborneol (MIB), etc.)
- Dissolved metals and salts (sodium, chloride, potassium, calcium, manganese, magnesium)
- Microorganisms such as fecal coliform bacteria (Escherichia coli), Cryptosporidium, and Giardia lamblia; see Bacteriological water analysis
- Dissolved metals and metalloids (lead, mercury, arsenic, etc.)
- Dissolved organics: colored dissolved organic matter (CDOM), dissolved organic carbon (DOC)
- Radon
- Heavy metals
- Pharmaceuticals
- Hormone analogs

=== Environmental indicators ===
==== Physical indicators ====
- Water temperature
- Specific conductance or electrical conductance (EC) or conductivity
- Total suspended solids (TSS)
- Transparency or turbidity
- Water clarity
- Total dissolved solids (TDS)
- Odour of water
- Color of water (such as Forel-Ule scale or Pt/Co scale)
- Taste of water

==== Chemical indicators ====
- Alkalinity
- Biochemical oxygen demand (BOD)
- Chemical oxygen demand (COD)
- Dissolved oxygen (DO)
- Total hardness (TH)
- Heavy metals
- Nitrate
- Orthophosphates
- pH
- Pesticides
- Residual sodium carbonate index (RSC)
- Sodium adsorption ratio (SAR)
- Surfactants

==== Biological indicators ====
- Ephemeroptera
- Plecoptera
- Mollusca
- Trichoptera
- Escherichia coli (E. coli)
- Coliform bacteria
- Pimephales promelas (fathead minnow)
- Americamysis bahia (Mysid shrimp)
- Sea urchin
- Protists, e.g. Paratrimastix pyriformis

Biological monitoring metrics have been developed in many places, and one widely used family of measurements for freshwater is the presence and abundance of members of the insect orders Ephemeroptera, Plecoptera and Trichoptera (EPT) (of benthic macroinvertebrates whose common names are, respectively, mayfly, stonefly and caddisfly). EPT indexes will naturally vary from region to region, but generally, within a region, the greater the number of taxa from these orders, the better the water quality. Organisations in the United States, such as EPA. offer guidance on developing a monitoring program and identifying members of these and other aquatic insect orders. Many US wastewater dischargers (e.g., factories, power plants, refineries, mines, municipal sewage treatment plants) are required to conduct periodic whole effluent toxicity (WET) tests.

Individuals interested in monitoring water quality who cannot afford or manage lab scale analysis can also use biological indicators to get a general reading of water quality. One example is the IOWATER volunteer water monitoring program of Iowa, which includes an EPT indicator key.

Bivalve molluscs are largely used as bioindicators to monitor the health of aquatic environments in both fresh water and the marine environments. Their population status or structure, physiology, behaviour or the level of contamination with elements or compounds can indicate the state of contamination status of the ecosystem. They are particularly useful since they are sessile so that they are representative of the environment where they are sampled or placed. A typical project is the U.S. Mussel Watch Programme, but today they are used worldwide.

The Southern African Scoring System (SASS) method is a biological water quality monitoring system based on the presence of benthic macroinvertebrates (EPT). The SASS aquatic biomonitoring tool has been refined over the past 30 years and is now on the fifth version (SASS5) which has been specifically modified in accordance with international standards, namely the ISO/IEC 17025 protocol. The SASS5 method is used by the South African Department of Water Affairs as a standard method for River Health Assessment, which feeds the national River Health Programme and the national Rivers Database.

== Climate change impacts ==
Weather and its related shocks can affect water quality in several ways. These depend on the local climate and context. Shocks that are linked to weather include water shortages, heavy rain and temperature extremes. They can damage water infrastructure through erosion under heavy rainfall and floods, cause loss of water sources in droughts, and make water quality deteriorate.

Climate change can reduce lower water quality in several ways:

- Heavy rainfall can rapidly reduce the water quality in rivers and shallow groundwater. It can affect water quality in reservoirs even if these effects can be slow. Heavy rainfall also impacts groundwater in deeper, unfractured aquifers. But these impacts are less pronounced. Rainfall can increase fecal contamination of water sources.
- Floods after heavy rainfalls can mix floodwater with wastewater. Also pollutants can reach water bodies by increased surface runoff.
- Groundwater quality may deteriorate due to droughts. The pollution in rivers that feed groundwater becomes less diluted. As groundwater levels drop, rivers may lose direct contact with groundwater.
- In coastal regions, more saltwater may mix into freshwater aquifers due to sea level rise and more intense storms. This process is called saltwater intrusion.
- Warmer water in lakes, oceans, reservoirs and rivers can cause more eutrophication. This results in more frequent harmful algal blooms. Higher temperatures cause problems for water bodies and aquatic ecosystems because warmer water contains less oxygen.
- Permafrost thawing leads to an increased flux of contaminants.
- Increased meltwater from glaciers may release contaminants. As glaciers shrink or disappear, the positive effect of seasonal meltwater on downstream water quality through dilution is disappearing.

== Standards and reports ==
In the setting of standards, agencies make political and technical/scientific decisions based on how the water will be used. In the case of natural water bodies, agencies also make some reasonable estimate of pristine conditions. Natural water bodies will vary in response to a region's environmental conditions, whereby water composition is influenced by the surrounding geological features, sediments, and rock types, topography, hydrology, and climate. Environmental scientists and aqueous geochemists work to interpret the parameters and environmental conditions that impact the water quality of a region, which in turn helps to identify the sources and fates of contaminants. Environmental lawyers and policymakers work to define legislation with the intention that water is maintained at an appropriate quality for its identified use.

Another general perception of water quality is that of a simple property that tells whether water is polluted or not. In fact, water quality is a complex subject, in part because water is a complex medium intrinsically tied to the ecology, geology, and anthropogenic activities of a region. Industrial and commercial activities (e.g. manufacturing, mining, construction, transport) are a major cause of water pollution as are runoff from agricultural areas, urban runoff and discharge of treated and untreated sewage.

=== International ===
- The World Health Organization (WHO) published updated guidelines for drinking-water quality (GDWQ) in 2017.
- The International Organization for Standardization (ISO) published regulation of water quality in the section of ICS 13.060, ranging from water sampling, drinking water, industrial class water, sewage, and examination of water for chemical, physical or biological properties. ICS 91.140.60 covers the standards of water supply systems.

=== National specifications for ambient water and drinking water ===
==== European Union ====
The water policy of the European Union is primarily codified in three directives:

- Directive on Urban Waste Water Treatment (91/271/EEC) of 21 May 1991 concerning discharges of municipal and some industrial wastewaters;
- The Drinking Water Directive (98/83/EC) of 3 November 1998 concerning potable water quality;
- Water Framework Directive (2000/60/EC) of 23 October 2000 concerning water resources management.

==== India ====
- Indian Council of Medical Research (ICMR) Standards for Drinking Water.

==== South Africa ====
Water quality guidelines for South Africa are grouped according to potential user types (e.g. domestic, industrial) in the 1996 Water Quality Guidelines. Drinking water quality is subject to the South African National Standard (SANS) 241 Drinking Water Specification.

==== United Kingdom ====
In England and Wales acceptable levels for drinking water supply are listed in the "Water Supply (Water Quality) Regulations 2000."

==== United States ====
In the United States, Water Quality Standards are defined by state agencies for various water bodies, guided by the desired uses for the water body (e.g., fish habitat, drinking water supply, recreational use). The Clean Water Act (CWA) requires each governing jurisdiction (states, territories, and covered tribal entities) to submit a set of biennial reports on the quality of water in their area. These reports are known as the 303(d) and 305(b) reports, named for their respective CWA provisions, and are submitted to, and approved by, EPA. These reports are completed by the governing jurisdiction, typically a state environmental agency. EPA recommends that each state submit a single "Integrated Report" comprising its list of impaired waters and the status of all water bodies in the state. The National Water Quality Inventory Report to Congress is a general report on water quality, providing overall information about the number of miles of streams and rivers and their aggregate condition. The CWA requires states to adopt standards for each of the possible designated uses that they assign to their waters. Should evidence suggest or document that a stream, river or lake has failed to meet the water quality criteria for one or more of its designated uses, it is placed on a list of impaired waters. Once a state has placed a water body on this list, it must develop a management plan establishing Total Maximum Daily Loads (TMDLs) for the pollutant(s) impairing the use of the water. These TMDLs establish the reductions needed to fully support the designated uses.

Drinking water standards, which are applicable to public water systems, are issued by EPA under the Safe Drinking Water Act.

== See also ==
- Aquatic toxicology – Study of manufactured products on aquatic organisms
- Permanganate index – Assessment of water quality
- Stiff diagram
- Water clarity – How deeply visible light penetrates through water
- Water quality modelling – Prediction of water pollution using mathematical simulation techniques
- Water resources – Sources of water that are potentially useful for humans
- Water testing – Procedures used to analyze water quality
- Water treatment – Process that improves the quality of water
