= Lauryl tryptose broth =

Selective culture medium for coliforms

Lauryl tryptose broth (LTB) is a selective growth medium (broth) for coliforms.

Lauryl tryptose broth is used for the most probable number test of coliforms in waters, effluent or sewage. It acts as a confirmation test for lactose fermentation with gas production. Sodium lauryl sulfate inhibits organisms other than coliforms.

Formula in grams/litre (g/L)

Tryptose: 20.0,
Lactose : 5.0,
Sodium chloride : 5.0,
Dipotassium phosphate : 2.75,
Potassium dihydrogen phosphate : 2.75,
Sodium dodecyl sulfate : 0.1
pH 6.8 ± 0.2

Samples positive for gas production are transferred to brilliant green lactose bile broth (BLGB) to detect the ability to grow in the presence of bile and produce gas at 95 °F (35 °C) for 48 hours. The absence of gas production in 48 hours is considered a negative test for coliforms. Gas production serves as both a presumptive test and a confirmatory medium.

Fecal coliforms are distinguished from coliforms by growth in EC broth at 113.9 °F (45.5 °C) for 24 hours.
