= Eosin methylene blue =

Culture medium in microbiology

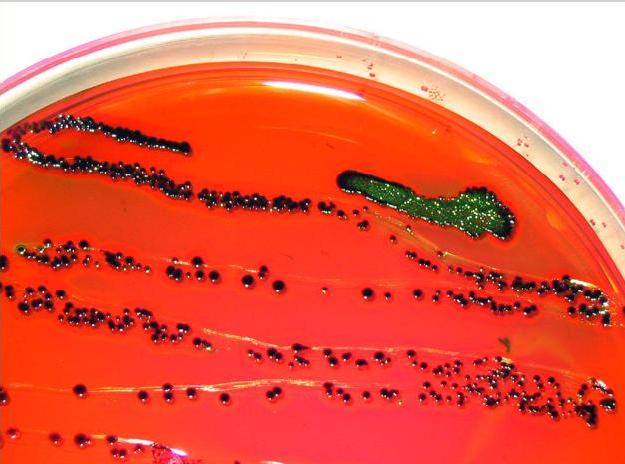
E. coli on EMB agar

Eosin methylene blue (EMB, also known as "Levine's formulation") is a selective and differential media used for the identification of Gram-negative bacteria, specifically the Enterobacteriaceae. EMB inhibits the growth of most Gram-positive bacteria. EMB is often used to confirm the presence of coliforms in a sample. It contains two dyes, eosin and methylene blue in the ratio of 6:1. EMB is a differential microbiological media, which inhibits the growth of Gram-positive bacteria and differentiates bacteria that ferment lactose (e.g., E. coli) from those that do not (e.g., Salmonella, Shigella). Organisms that ferment lactose appear dark/black or green often with "nucleated colonies"—colonies with dark centers. Organisms that do not ferment lactose will appear pink and often mucoid.

This culture media is important in medical laboratories by allowing the identification of enteric bacteria microbes in a short period of time.

- Rapid lactose fermentation produces acids, which lower the pH. This encourages dye absorption by the colonies, which are now colored purple-black.
- Lactose non-fermenters may increase the pH by deamination of proteins. This ensures that the dye is not absorbed. The colonies will be colorless.

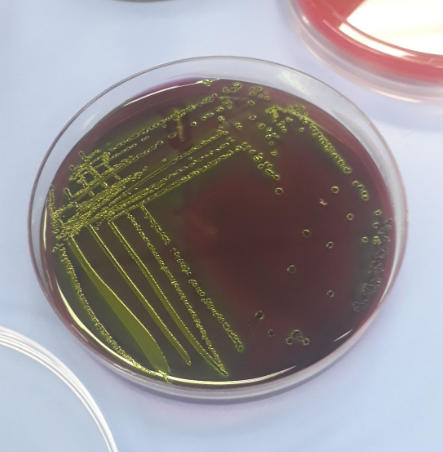
Metallic green sheen of E. coli on EMB agar

On EMB if E. coli is grown it will give a distinctive metallic green sheen (due to the metachromatic properties of the dyes, E. coli movement using flagella, and strong acid end-products of fermentation). Some species of Citrobacter and Enterobacter will also react this way to EMB. This medium has been specifically designed to discourage the growth of Gram-positive bacteria.

EMB contains the following ingredients: peptone, lactose, dipotassium phosphate, eosin Y (dye), methylene blue (dye), and agar.

There are also EMB agars that do not contain lactose.
