= Coliform bacteria =

Group of bacterial species

Escherichia coli

Coliform bacteria are defined as either motile or non-motile Gram-negative non-spore forming bacilli that possess β-galactosidase to produce acids and gases under their optimal growth temperature of 35–37 °C. They can be aerobes or facultative aerobes, and are a commonly used indicator of low sanitary quality of foods, milk, and water. Coliforms can be found in the aquatic environment, in soil and on vegetation; they are universally present in large numbers in the feces of warm-blooded animals as they are known to inhabit the gastrointestinal system. While coliform bacteria are not normally the cause of serious illness, they are easy to culture, and their presence is used to infer that other pathogenic organisms of fecal origin may be present in a sample, or that said sample is not safe to consume. Such pathogens include disease-causing bacteria, viruses, or protozoa and many multicellular parasites. Every drinking water source must be tested for the presence of these total coliform bacteria.

== General ==
Typical genera include:

- Citrobacter are peritrichous facultative anaerobic bacilli between 0.6–6 μm in length. Citrobacter species inhabit intestinal flora without causing harm, but can lead to urinary tract infections, bacteremia, brain abscesses, pneumonia, intra abdominal sepsis, meningitis, and joint infections if they are given the opportunity. Infections of a Citrobacter species has a mortality rate between 33–48%, with infants and immunocompromised individuals being more susceptible.
- Enterobacter are motile, flagellated bacilli known for causing infections such as bacteremia, respiratory tract infections, urinary tract infections, infections of areas where surgery occurred, and in extreme cases meningitis, sinusitis and osteomyelitis. To determine the presence of Enterobacter in a sample, they are first grown on MacConkey agar to confirm they are lactose fermenting. An indole test will differentiate Enterobacter from Escherichia, as Enterobacter are indole negative and Escherichia is positive. Enterobacter are distinguished from Klebsiella because of their differences in motility.
- Klebsiella are non-motile, Gram-negative bacilli ranging from 1–2 μm in length. They are facultative anaerobes with a capsule composed of complex acid polysaccharides that allows them to withstand drying for several months. Klebsiella pneumoniae is the most common Klebsiella species found in humans, the gastrointestinal tracts of animals, in sewage and in soil. On carbohydrate-rich media, Klebsiella colonies appear greyish-white in colour with a mucosal outer surface. The media used for selecting for Klebsiella species in a mixed sample is an agar including ornithine, raffinose, and Koser citrate, where members of this genus will form yellow, wet-looking colonies.
- Escherichia species normally inhabit the human intestine and those of other warm-blooded animals, and are the most commonly responsible for causing disease in humans. Escherichia coli specifically is the most common organism seen in the human intestine and are known to cause a variety of diseases in humans. Most E. coli strains are motile and have obtained many of their virulence features from horizontal gene transfer. There are several different pathotypes of E. coli causing gastrointestinal syndromes: diarrheagenic E. coli (DEC), enterotoxigenic E. coli (ETEC); EPEC; Shiga toxin–producingE. coli (STEC), which includes EHEC; enteroaggregative E. coli (EAEC); and enteroinvasive E. coli (EIEC). There are different ways to identify E. coli based on variation of their O, H and K polysaccharides on their cell surface or by using selective medias.

Escherichia coli (E. coli) can be distinguished from most other coliforms by its ability to ferment lactose at 44 °C in the fecal coliform test, and by its growth and color reaction on certain types of culture media. When cultured on an eosin methylene blue (EMB) plate, a positive result for E. coli is metallic green colonies on a dark purple medium. Also can be cultured on Tryptone Bile X-Glucuronide (TBX) to appear as blue or green colonies after incubation period of 24 hours. Escherichia coli have an incubation period of 12–72 hours with the optimal growth temperature being 37 °C. Unlike the general coliform group, E. coli are almost exclusively of fecal origin and their presence is thus an effective confirmation of fecal contamination. Most strains of E. coli are harmless, but some can cause serious illness in humans. Infection symptoms and signs include bloody diarrhea, stomach cramps, vomiting and occasionally, fever. The bacteria can also cause pneumonia, other respiratory illnesses and urinary tract infections.

An easy way to differentiate between different types of coliform bacteria is by using an eosin methylene blue agar plate. This plate is partially inhibitory to Gram (+) bacteria, and will produce a color change in the Gram (-) bacterial colonies based on lactose fermentation abilities. Strong lactose fermenters will appear as dark blue/purple/black, and E.coli (which also ferments lactose) colonies will be dark colored, but will also appear to have a metallic green sheen. Other coliform bacteria will appear as thick, slimy colonies, with non-fermenters being colorless, and weak fermenters being pink.

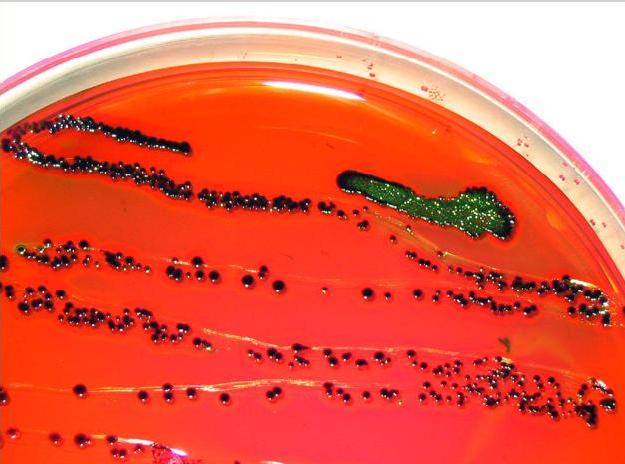
E. coli on EMB agar

=== Incidence of coliform outbreaks ===
==== Escherichia coli O157 ====
As of November 15, 2021, seven states in the USA declared ten cases of illnesses from an E. coli O157:H7 strain. These cases were reported from October 15, 2021 through October 27, 2021 and an investigation was carried out by the Minnesota Department of Agriculture and FDA. It was concluded that packages of spinach collected from homes of infected people were contaminated with a strain of E. coli that matched the strain causing illness. This was determined by performing whole genome sequencing on the strain extracted from the spinach and comparing it to the strain taken from infected individuals.

As of February 7, 2022, the provinces of Alberta and Saskatchewan in Canada reported a collective fourteen confirmed cases of E. coli O157 strain illnesses. These were reported between December 2021 and January 2022, and the Public Health Agency of Canada (PHAC), the Canadian Food Inspection Agency (CFIA), and Health Canada were able to determine a specific brand of Original Kimchi to be the source of the organism. On January 28, 2022 and February 6, 2022, the CFIA issued a recall on Hankook Original Kimchi.

=== Detection of coliform bacteria in drinking water ===
==== PCR ====
Amplification of the beta-galactosidase gene is used to detect coliforms in general, because all coliform organisms produce this compound. The amplification of the beta-D glucuronidase is used to detect E. coli, or the amplification of their verotoxin gene(s) to detect verotoxin-producing E. coli.

==== Chemiluminescent in-situ hybridization ====
Specific areas of the 16S rRNA in the Enterobacteriaceae genus are bound by oligonucleotide probes, which aids in monitoring the quality of drinking water. Specifically, E. coli is labelled with a soybean peroxidase-labeled peptide nucleic acid (PNA) probes that bind to a specific sequence in their 16S rRNA. When used in conjunction with a chemiluminescent substrate, light is produced where each colony of E. coli is located, indicating that they are present in the sample.

==== Violet red bile agar ====
The solid medium is used to grow lactose-fermenting coliforms and utilizes a neutral red pH indicator. Pink colonies appear when lactose is fermented and are surrounded by bile that has precipitated out. To confirm if these colonies are coliforms, they are transferred to brilliant green lactose bile (BGLB) and incubated. If gas is visible after incubation, it can be confirmed that the sample had coliforms present.

==== Membrane filter method ====
Test samples are filtered through standard filter paper and then transferred to M-endo or LES Endo Agar mediums. Colonies appear pinkish-red with green metallic sheen after 22–24 hours of incubation. These colonies can be confirmed as coliforms if they are inoculated in lauryl tryptose (LST), produce gas, and then inoculated in BGLB. If there is gas production in the BGLB tubes, the test is positive for the presence of coliform bacteria.

== See also ==
- Bacteriological water analysis
- Coliform index
- Fecal coliform
- Indicator bacteria
- Pathogenic Escherichia coli
