= Autosampler =

Device periodically collecting samples for an analytical instrument

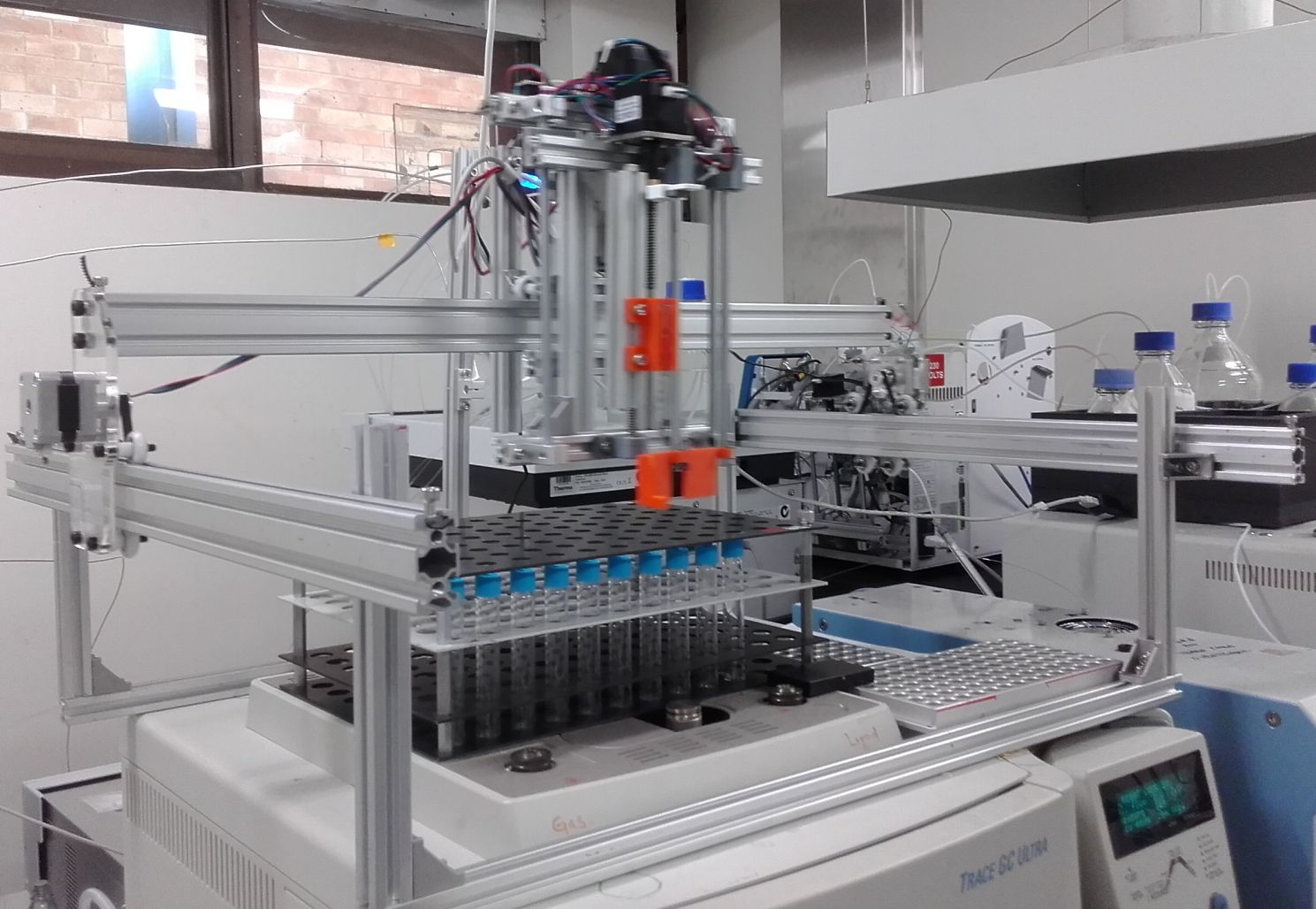
Autosampler

An autosampler is commonly a device that is coupled to an analytical instrument providing samples periodically for analysis. An autosampler can also be understood as a device that collects samples periodically from a large sample source, like the atmosphere or a lake, for example.

Autosamplers enable substantial gains in productivity, precision and accuracy in many analytical scenarios, and therefore are widely employed in laboratories.

== Types ==
An autosampler normally consist of an automated machine or robotic device that can either bring the sample to a sampling station, or bring a sampling device to the sample that stays on a tray (or carousel) along with other samples.

=== Autosamplers for solids ===
An autosampler for solid samples for gamma ray measurement

Some autosamplers for solids are used in conjunction with elemental analyzers. Common models consist of a carousel that holds the samples that are commonly wrapped in metal (usually tin or silver) foil. Usually, by spinning by the carousel a fixed number of degrees, a sample falls into the reactor, which is constantly purged by a carrier gas (He, for example).

Other autosamplers for solids can be used for non-destructive analyses as well, like weighing and gamma ray measurements, for example. In these cases, a mechanism brings the sample to the analyzer and, when the measurement is finished, it removes the sample, thus allowing a consecutive measurement.

=== Autosamplers for liquids ===
An autosampler for liquid or gaseous samples based on a microsyringe

Autosamplers for liquids work along many kinds of machines that perform different kinds of chemical measurements, like titrators, gas chromatographers, liquid chromatographers, water analyzers (like total carbon analyzers, dissolved inorganic carbon analyzers, nutrient analyzers) and many others.

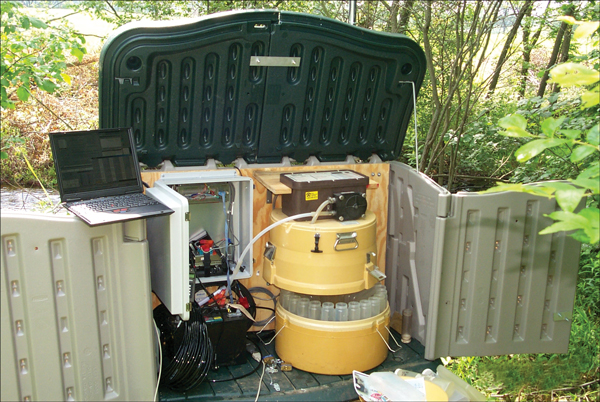
A field-based autosampler for collection of water quality samples

Many autosamplers for liquids consist of a carousel and the sampling apparatus. The carousel holds the samples, and revolves around its center so that samples change their horizontal position. There may be several concentric rings holding samples in a carousel. The sampling apparatus can be fixed horizontally, only moving up and down to allow the carousel to move, or it can also move horizontally, depending on the design of the system. The sampling apparatus in most of such autosamplers consist of a needle connected to a remote pumping syringe via tubing. Similar designs have been employed for titrators, which do not have a sampling apparatus, but a titration apparatus.

Another common design for autosamplers for liquids is of a sampling apparatus that moves freely in the 3D space, similarly to CNC routers and 3D printers, for instance. The sampling apparatus, in these autosamplers, can also be simply a needle, as for most carousel autosamplers, or it can be a syringe, thus dispensing the need for a remote pump. This kind of design is appropriate for small sample volumes (in the order of tens of microliters), commonly used in gas chromatography, for example.

A less common, but potentially much more affordable, kind of autosampler for liquids is a robotic arm which carries the sample to the sampling tube or needle, or to the titration area.

=== Autosamplers for gases ===
Autosamplers for gases can be as simple as a pump that continuously sucks air or any gas mixture inside the analytical device, or be the same as the one used for liquids, but with a gas-tight syringe.

== Compatibility issues ==
Many autosamplers are sold as optional parts of the analytical setup, and make up for a substantial portion of its total cost. It is noteworthy that autosamplers for different devices work in a very similar way and could easily be adopted by different machines. However, this is uncommon as manufacturers often restrict the compatibility of accessories to their analytical setup.

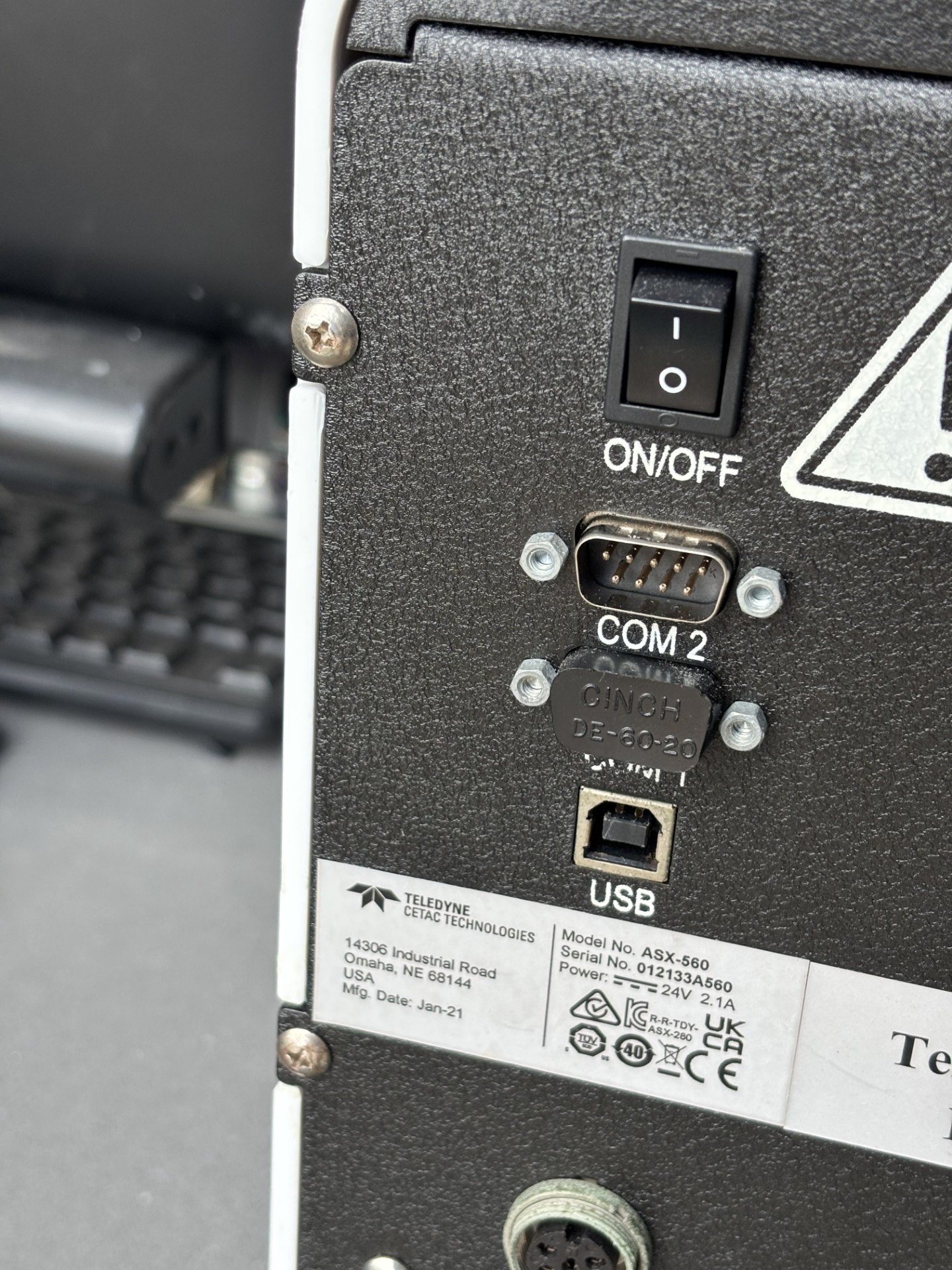
A universal autosampler with RS-232 ports

Lack of compatibility between analytical instruments from different manufacturers has been repeatedly recognized as a problem in analytical scenarios. A solution often proposed is the adoption of standards by different manufacturers which would enable machines to communicate between them seamlessly. However, there has been little real progress in this area, despite larger efforts in this direction. Universal autosamplers often use the old RS-232 port for communication with the analyzer.

It is noted that many manufacturers incorporate contact closure pins/ports on their autosamplers, which means that the autosamplers are able to communicate with the other parts of most third party chromatography instrumentation.

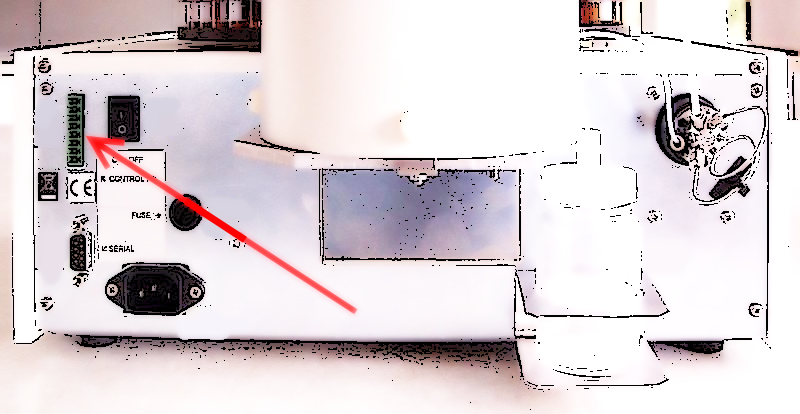
Contact closure ports at the rear of an AutoQuest autosampler.

A different solution for the lack of compatibility between analytical instruments is their coupling by means of scripting. This way, substantial savings are possible.
