= Lending Code =

The Standards of Lending Practice (previously the Lending Code) are voluntary and set the benchmark for good lending practice in the United Kingdom, outlining the way registered firms are expected to deal with their customers throughout the entire product life cycle. The Lending Standards Board, which oversees the standards, began its work on 2 November 2009, taking the place of the former Banking Code Standards Board.

The Standards of Lending Practice for personal customers covers loans, credit cardis, charge cards and overdrafts. The Standards of Lending Practice for business customers covers loans, credit cards, charge cards and overdrafts, with a separate set of standards covering asset finance.

Each section of the Standards contains:

- A customer outcome;
- An overall statement of how a firm intends to achieve this outcome; and
- A detailed set of standards that demonstrate the approach.

While a number of these outcomes are well established within firms, new areas do emerge from time to time. As and when they do, the Standards of Lending Practice will evolve to help registered firms develop their approach to them.
