= Fecal coliform =

Types of bacteria found in feces

A fecal coliform (British: faecal coliform) is a facultatively anaerobic, rod-shaped, Gram-negative, non-sporulating bacterium. Coliform bacteria generally originate in the intestines of warm-blooded animals. Fecal coliforms are capable of growth in the presence of bile salts or similar surface agents, are oxidase negative, and produce acid and gas from lactose within 48 hours at 44 ± 0.5°C. The term thermotolerant coliform is more correct and is gaining acceptance over "fecal coliform".

Coliform bacteria include genera that originate in feces (e.g. Escherichia, Enterobacter, Klebsiella, Citrobacter). The fecal coliform assay is intended to be an indicator of fecal contamination; more specifically of E. coli which is an indicator microorganism for other pathogens that may be present in feces. Presence of fecal coliforms in water may not be directly harmful, and it does not necessarily indicate the presence of feces.

== Fecal bacteria as indicator of water quality ==
=== Background ===
In general, increased levels of fecal coliforms provide a warning of failure in water treatment, a break in the integrity of the distribution system, possible contamination with pathogens. When levels are high there may be an elevated risk of waterborne gastroenteritis. Tests for the bacteria are cheap, reliable and rapid (1-day incubation).

=== Potential sources of bacteria in water ===
The presence of fecal coliform in aquatic environments may indicate that the water has been contaminated with the fecal material of humans or other animals. Fecal coliform bacteria can enter rivers through direct discharge of waste from mammals and birds, from agricultural and storm runoff, and from human sewage. However, their presence may also be the result of plant material, and pulp or paper mill effluent.

==== Human sewage ====
Failing home septic systems can allow coliforms in the effluent to flow into the water table, aquifers, drainage ditches and nearby surface waters. Sewage connections that are connected to storm drain pipes can also allow human sewage into surface waters. Some older industrial cities, particularly in the Northeast and Midwest of the United States, use a combined sewer system to handle waste. A combined sewer carries both domestic sewage and stormwater. During high rainfall periods, a combined sewer can become overloaded and overflow to a nearby stream or river, bypassing treatment.

==== Agriculture ====
Agricultural practices such as allowing livestock to graze near water bodies, spreading manure as fertilizer on fields during wet periods, using sewage sludge biosolids and allowing livestock watering in streams can all contribute to fecal coliform contamination.

=== Problems resulting from fecal contamination of water ===
==== Human health hazards ====
Large quantities of fecal coliform bacteria in water are not harmful according to some authorities, but may indicate a higher risk of pathogens being present in the water. Some waterborne pathogenic diseases that may coincide with fecal coliform contamination include ear infections, dysentery, typhoid fever, viral and bacterial gastroenteritis, and hepatitis A.

==== Effects on the environment ====
Untreated organic matter that contains fecal coliform can be harmful to the environment. Aerobic decomposition of this material can reduce dissolved oxygen levels if discharged into rivers or waterways. This may reduce the oxygen level enough to kill fish and other aquatic life. Reduction of fecal coliform in wastewater may require the use of chlorine and other disinfectant chemicals, or UV disinfection treatment. Such materials may kill the fecal coliform and disease bacteria. They also kill bacteria essential to the proper balance of the aquatic environment, endangering the survival of species dependent on those bacteria. So higher levels of fecal coliform require higher levels of chlorine, threatening those aquatic organisms.

== Removal and treatment ==
Fecal coliform, like other bacteria, can usually be inhibited in growth by boiling water, treating with chlorine, or UV disinfection. Washing thoroughly with soap after contact with contaminated water can also help prevent infections. Gloves should always be worn when testing for fecal coliform. Municipalities that maintain a public water supply will typically monitor and treat for fecal coliforms. It can also be removed by iodine.

== Testing ==
=== Public health risk monitoring ===
In waters of the U.S., Canada and other countries, water quality is monitored to protect the health of the general public. Bacteria contamination is one monitored pollutant. In the U.S., fecal coliform testing is one of the nine tests of water quality that form the overall water-quality rating in a process used by U.S. EPA. The fecal coliform assay should only be used to assess the presence of fecal matter in situations where fecal coliforms of non-fecal origin are not commonly encountered. EPA has approved a number of different methods to analyze samples for bacteria.

=== Analysis ===
Bacteria reproduce rapidly if conditions are right for growth. Most bacteria grow best in dark, warm, moist environments with food. When grown on solid media, some bacteria form colonies as they multiply, and they may grow large enough to be seen. By growing and counting colonies of fecal coliform bacteria from a sample of water, the amount of bacteria originally present can be determined.

Membrane filtration is the method of choice for the analysis of fecal coliforms in water. Samples to be tested are passed through a filter of a particular pore size (generally 0.45 micrometre). The microorganisms present in the water remain on the filter surface. The filter is placed in a sterile Petri dish with a selective medium; growth of the desired organisms is encouraged, while other non-target organisms are suppressed. Each cell develops into a separate colony, which can be counted directly, and the initial inoculum size can be determined. Typically, sample volumes of 100 ml will be used for water testing and filtered to achieve a final desirable colony density range of 20 to 60 colonies per filter. Contaminated sources may require dilution to achieve a "countable" membrane. The filter is placed on a Petri dish containing M-FC agar and incubated for 24 hours at 44.5 °C (112.1 degrees F). This elevated temperature heat shocks non-fecal bacteria and suppresses their growth. As the fecal coliform colonies grow, they produce an acid (through fermenting lactose) that reacts with the aniline dye in the agar, thus giving the colonies their blue color.

Newer methods for coliform detection are based on specific enzyme substrates as indicators of coliforms. These assays use a sugar linked to a dye which, when acted on by the enzyme beta-galactosidase, produces a characteristic color. The enzyme beta-galactosidase is a marker for coliforms generally and may be assayed by hydrolysis of enzyme-specific glycosides such as o-nitrophenyl-beta-D-galactose. Assays typically include a second sugar linked to a different dye, which produces a fluorescent product when acted on by the enzyme beta-glucuronidase. Because E. coli produces both beta-galactosidase and beta-glucuronidase, combining two dyes makes it possible to differentiate and quantify coliforms and E. coli in the same pot.

More recently, the chemistry behind enzymatic detection compounds has been updated so that the indicating component is redox active, as opposed to the more usual chromogenic format, allowing fecal indicator bacteria such as E. coli and E. faecalis to be detected electrochemically without any sample pre-treatment. Since the colour of the detection compound is of no consequence, this allows detection in deeply coloured matrices.

=== US EPA testing requirements ===
In 1989, the U.S. Environmental Protection Agency (EPA) published its Total Coliform Rule (TCR), which imposed major monitoring changes for public water systems nationwide. The testing requirements under the 1989 TCR were more thorough than the previous requirements. The number of routine coliform tests was increased, especially for smaller water utilities. The regulation also required automatic repeat testing from all sources that show a total coliform positive (known as triggered source water monitoring). In 2013, EPA revised the TCR, with minor corrections in 2014.

== See also ==
- Coliform bacteria
- Coliform index
- Colony-forming unit
- Indicator bacteria

== Additional resources ==
- EPA. "Monitoring and Assessing Water Quality: Fecal Bacteria."
