= Total viable count =

Total viable count (TVC), gives a quantitative estimate of the concentration of microorganisms such as bacteria, yeast or mould spores in a sample. The count represents the number of colony forming units (cfu) per g (or per ml) of the sample.

A TVC is achieved by plating serial tenfold dilutions of the sample until between 30 and 300 colonies can be counted on a single plate. The reported count is the number of colonies counted multiplied by the dilution used for the counted plate

A high TVC count indicates a high concentration of micro-organisms which may indicate poor quality for drinking water or foodstuff.

In food microbiology it is used as a benchmark for the evaluation of the shelf-life of foodstuffs
