= Landfill leachate =

Water from landfills carrying waste contaminants

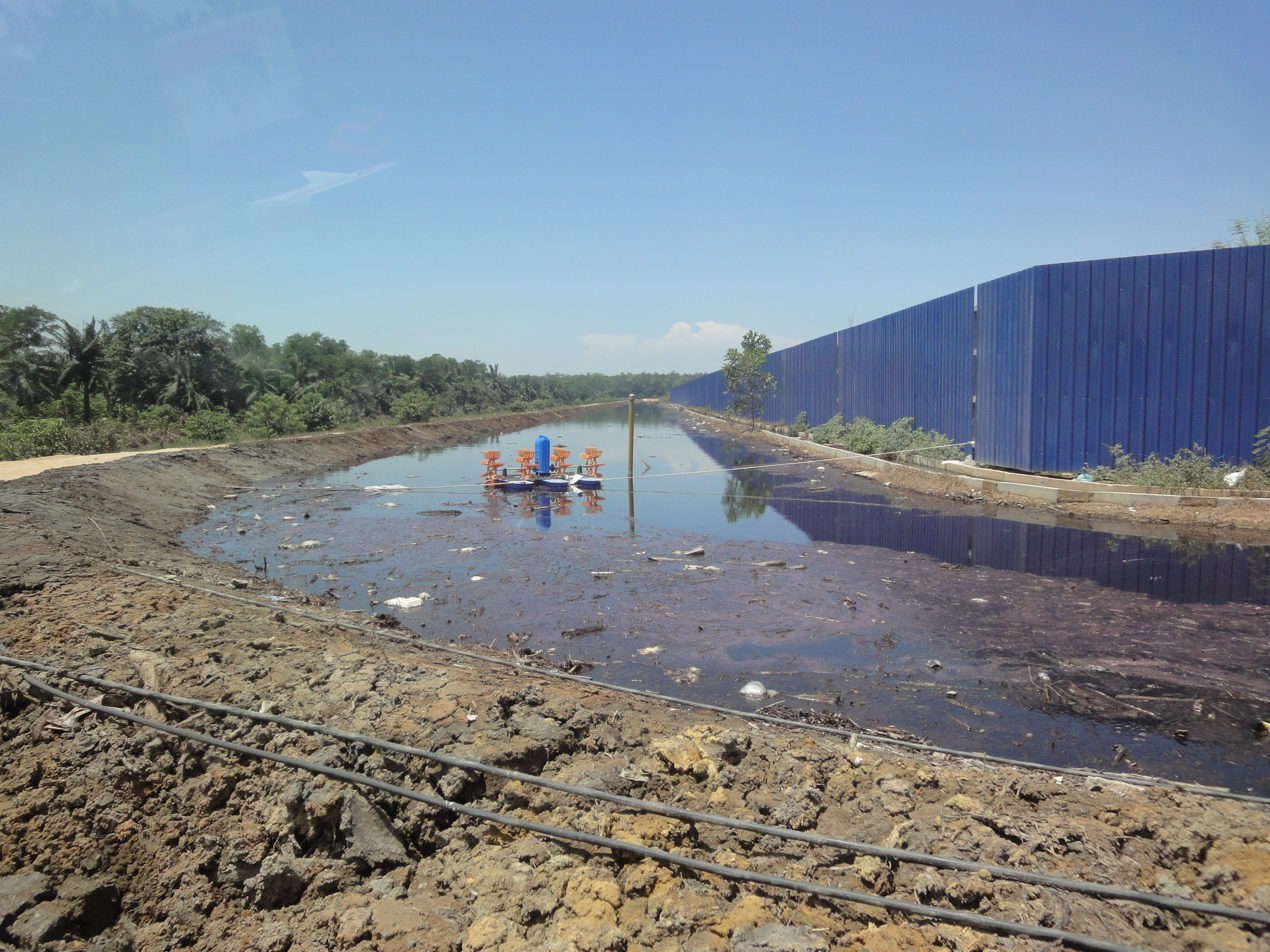
Part of a leachate containment system in a landfill in Penang, Malaysia

Landfill leachate is contaminated liquid formed when rain or another source of water enters a landfill and comes in contact with waste, which may then flow into and contaminate local groundwater if not properly managed. Landfill leachate varies widely in composition depending on the age of the landfill and the type of waste that it contains. It usually contains both dissolved and suspended material. The generation of leachate is caused principally by precipitation percolating through waste deposited in a landfill. Once in contact with decomposing solid waste, the percolating water becomes contaminated, and if it then flows out of the waste material it is termed leachate. Additional leachate volume is produced during this decomposition of carbonaceous material producing a wide range of other materials including methane, carbon dioxide and a complex mixture of organic acids, aldehydes, alcohols and simple sugars.

The risks of leachate generation can be mitigated by properly designed and engineered landfill sites, such as those that are constructed on geologically impermeable materials or sites that use impermeable liners made of geomembranes or engineered clay. The use of linings is now mandatory within the United States, Australia and the European Union except where the waste is deemed inert. In addition, most toxic and difficult materials are now specifically excluded from landfilling. However, despite much stricter statutory controls, leachates from modern sites are often found to contain a range of contaminants stemming from illegal activity or legally discarded household and domestic products.

In a 2012 survey performed in New York State, all surveyed double-lined landfill cells had leakage rates of less than 500 liters per hectare per day. Average leakage rates were much lower than for landfills built according to older standards before 1992.

== Composition ==
When water percolates through waste, it promotes and assists the process of decomposition by bacteria and fungi. These processes in turn release by-products of decomposition and rapidly use up any available oxygen, creating an anoxic environment. In actively decomposing waste, the temperature rises and the pH falls rapidly with the result that many metal ions that are relatively insoluble at neutral pH become dissolved in the developing leachate. The decomposition processes themselves release more water, which adds to the volume of leachate. Leachate also reacts with materials that are not prone to decomposition themselves, such as fire ash, cement-based building materials and gypsum-based materials changing the chemical composition. In sites with large volumes of building waste, especially those containing gypsum plaster, the reaction of leachate with the gypsum can generate large volumes of hydrogen sulfide, which may be released in the leachate and may also form a large component of the landfill gas. The physical appearance of leachate when it emerges from a typical landfill site is a strongly odoured black-, yellow- or orange-coloured cloudy liquid. The smell is acidic and offensive and may be very pervasive because of hydrogen-, nitrogen- and sulfur-rich organic species such as mercaptans.

In a landfill that receives a mixture of municipal, commercial, and mixed industrial waste but excludes significant amounts of concentrated chemical waste, landfill leachate may be characterized as a water-based solution of four groups of contaminants: dissolved organic matter (alcohols, acids, aldehydes, short chain sugars, etc.), inorganic macro components (common cations and anions including sulfate, chloride, iron, aluminium, zinc and ammonia), heavy metals (lead, nickel, copper, mercury), and xenobiotic organic compounds such as halogenated organics, (PCBs, dioxins, etc.). A number of complex organic contaminants have also been detected in landfill leachates. Samples from raw and treated landfill leachate yielded 58 complex organic contaminants including 2-OH-benzothiazole in 84% of the samples and perfluorooctanoic acid in 68%. Bisphenol A, valsartan and 2-OH-benzothiazole had the highest average concentrations in raw leachates, after biological treatment and after reverse osmosis, respectively.

== Management ==
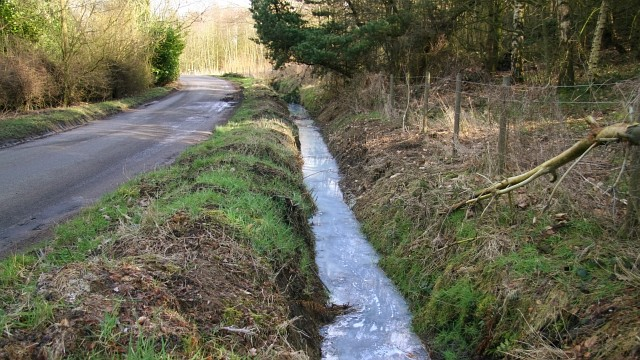
Drainage channel in England with leachate from waste from a former colliery

In older landfills and those with no membrane between the waste and the underlying geology, leachate is free to leave the waste and flow directly into the groundwater. In such cases, high concentrations of leachate are often found in nearby springs and flushes. As leachate first emerges it can be black in colour, anoxic, and possibly effervescent, with dissolved and entrained gases. As it becomes oxygenated it tends to turn brown or yellow because of the presence of iron salts in solution and in suspension. It also quickly develops a bacterial flora often comprising substantial growths of Sphaerotilus natans.

== History of collection ==
In the UK, in the late 1960s, central government policy was to ensure new landfill sites were being chosen with permeable underlying geological strata to avoid the build-up of leachate. This policy was dubbed "dilute and disperse". However, following a number of cases where this policy was seen to be failing, and an exposee in The Sunday Times of serious environmental damage being caused by inappropriate disposal of industrial wastes, both policy and the law were changed. The Deposit of Poisonous Wastes Act 1972, together with The 1974 Local Government Act, made local government responsible for waste disposal and for the enforcement of environmental standards regarding waste disposal.

Proposed landfill locations also had to be justified not only by geography but also scientifically. Many European countries decided to select landfill sites in groundwater-free clay geological conditions or to require that the site have an engineered lining. In the wake of European advancements, the United States increased its development of leachate retaining and collection systems. This quickly led from lining in principle to the use of multiple lining layers in all landfills (excepting those truly inert).

== Collection systems ==
The primary criterion for design of the leachate system is that all leachate be collected and removed from the landfill at a rate sufficient to prevent an unacceptable hydraulic head occurring at any point over the lining system.

There are many components to a collection system including pumps, manholes, discharge lines and liquid level monitors. However, there are four main components which govern the overall efficiency of the system. These four elements are liners, filters, pumps and sumps.

=== Liners ===
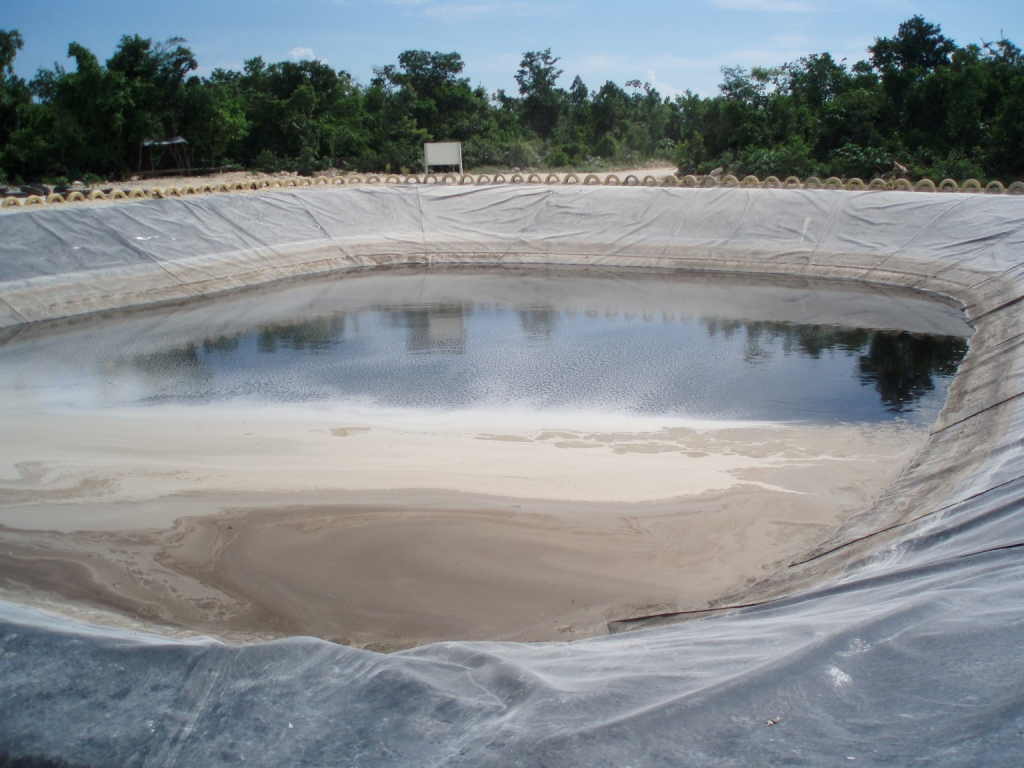
Lined leachate evaporation pond in a landfill in Cancún, Mexico

Natural and synthetic liners may be utilized as both a collection device and as a means for isolating leachate within the fill to protect the soil and groundwater below. The chief concern is the ability of a liner to maintain integrity and impermeability over the life of the landfill. Subsurface water monitoring, leachate collection, and clay liners are commonly included in the design and construction of a waste landfill. To effectively serve the purpose of containing leachate in a landfill, a liner system must possess a number of physical properties. The liner must have high tensile strength, flexibility, and elongation without failure. It is also important that the liner resist abrasion, puncture, and chemical degradation by leachate. Lastly, the liner must withstand temperature variation, must resist UV light (which leads most liners to be black), must be easily installed, and must be economical.

There are several types of liners used in leachate control and collection. These types include geomembranes, geosynthetic clay liners, geotextiles, geogrids, geonets, and geocomposites. Each style of liner has specific uses and abilities. Geomembranes are used to provide a barrier between mobile polluting substances released from wastes and the groundwater. In the closing of landfills, geomembranes are used to provide a low-permeability cover barrier to prevent the intrusion of rain water. Geosynthetic clay liners (GCLs) are fabricated by distributing sodium bentonite in a uniform thickness between woven and non-woven geotextiles. Sodium bentonite has a low permeability, which makes GCLs a suitable alternative to clay liners in a composite liner system. Geotextiles are used as separation between two different types of soils to prevent contamination of the lower layer by the upper layer. Geotextiles also act as a cushion to protect synthetic layers against puncture from underlying and overlaying rocks. Geogrids are structural synthetic materials used in slope veneer stability to create stability for cover soils over synthetic liners or as soil reinforcement in steep slopes. Geonets are synthetic drainage materials that are often used in lieu of sand and gravel. Radz can take 12 in (30 cm) of drainage sand, thus increasing the landfill space for waste. Geocomposites are a combination of synthetic materials that are ordinarily used singly. A common type of geocomposite is a geonet that is heat-bonded to two layers of geotextile, one on each side. The geocomposite serves as a filter and drainage medium.

Geosynthetic clay liners are a type of combination liner. One advantage to using a geosynthetic clay liner (GCL) is the ability to order exact amounts of the liner. Ordering precise amounts from the manufacturer prevents surplus and over-spending. Another advantage to GCLs is that the liner can be used in areas without an adequate clay source. On the other hand, GCLs are heavy and cumbersome, and their installation is very labor-intensive. In addition to being arduous and difficult under normal conditions, installation can be cancelled during damp conditions because the bentonite would absorb the moisture, making the job even more burdensome and tedious.

=== Drainage system ===
The leachate drainage system is responsible for the collection and transport of the leachate collected inside the liner. The pipe dimensions, type, and layout must all be planned with the weight and pressure of waste, and transport vehicles in mind. The pipes are located on the floor of the cell. Above the network lies an enormous amount of weight and pressure. To support this, the pipes can either be flexible or rigid, but the joints to connect the pipes yield better results if the connections are flexible. An alternative to placing the collection system underneath the waste is to position the conduits in trenches or above grade.

The collection pipe network of a leachate collection system drains, collects, and transports leachate through the drainage layer to a collection sump where it is removed for treatment or disposal. The pipes also serve as drains within the drainage layer to minimize the mounding of leachate in the layer. These pipes are designed with cuts that are inclined to 120 degrees, preventing entry of solid particles.

=== Filters ===
The filter layer is used above the drainage layer in leachate collection. Two types of filters are typically used in engineering practices: granular and geotextile. Granular filters consist of one or more soil layers or multiple layers having a coarser gradation in the direction of the seepage than the soil to be protected.

=== Sumps or leachate well ===
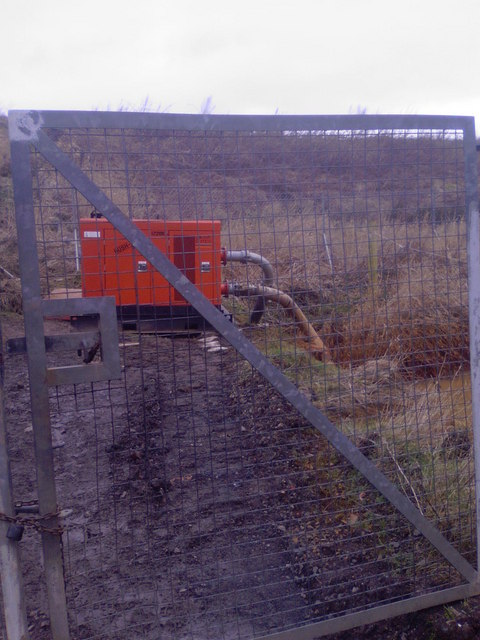
Leachate tank in a landfill in Scotland

As liquid enters the landfill cell, it moves down the filter, passes through the pipe network, and rests in the sump. As collection systems are planned, the number, location, and size of the sumps are vital to an efficient operation. When designing sumps, the amount of leachate and liquid expected is the foremost concern. Areas in which rainfall is higher than average typically have larger sumps. A further criterion for sump planning is accounting for the pump capacity. The relationship of pump capacity and sump size is inverse. If the pump capacity is low, the volume of the sump should be larger than average. It is critical for the volume of the sump to be able to store the expected leachate between pumping cycles. This relationship helps maintain a healthy operation. Sump pumps can function with preset phase times. If the flow is not predictable, a predetermined leachate height level can automatically switch the system on.

Other conditions for sump planning are maintenance and pump drawdown. Collection pipes typically convey the leachate by gravity to one or more sumps, depending upon the size of the area drained. Leachate collected in the sump is removed by pumping to a vehicle, to a holding facility for subsequent vehicle pickup, or to an on-site treatment facility. Sump dimensions are governed by the amount of leachate to be stored, pump capacity, and minimum pump drawdown. The volume of the sump must be sufficient to hold the maximum amount of leachate anticipated between pump cycles, plus an additional volume equal to the minimum pump drawdown volume. Sump size should also consider dimensional requirements for conducting maintenance and inspection activities. Sump pumps may operate with preset cycling times or, if leachate flow is less predictable, the pump may be automatically switched on when the leachate reaches a predetermined level.

=== Membrane and collection for treatment ===
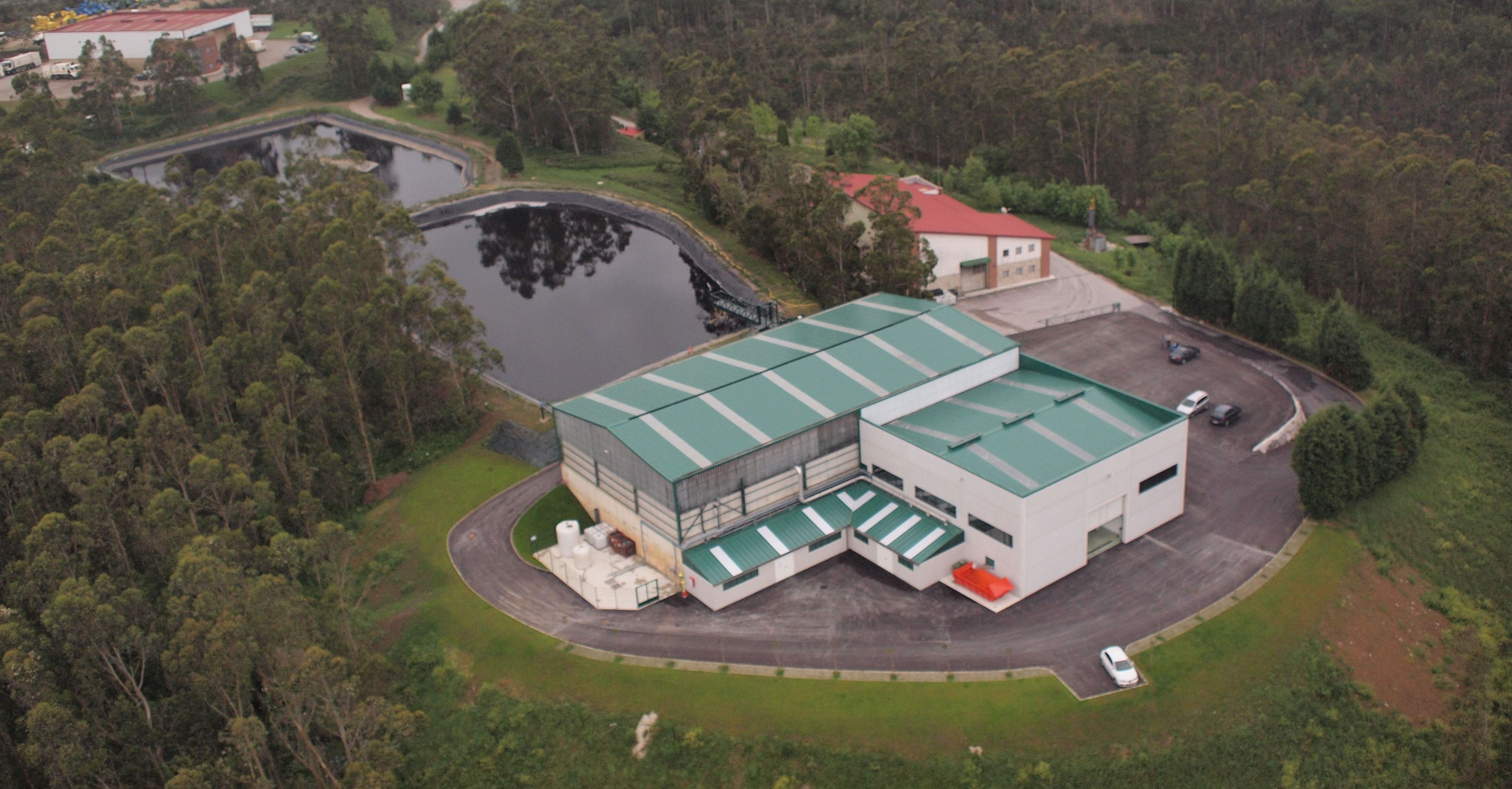
Leachate treatment plant in Spain

More modern landfills in the developed world have some form of membrane separating the waste from the surrounding ground, and in such sites there is often a leachate collection series of pipes laid on the membrane to convey the leachate to a collection or treatment location. An example of a treatment system with only minor membrane use is the Nantmel Landfill Site.

All membranes are porous to a limited extent so that, over time, low volumes of leachate will cross the membrane. The design of landfill membranes is at such low volumes that they should never have a measurable adverse impact on the quality of the receiving groundwater. A more significant risk may be the failure or abandonment of the leachate collection system. Such systems are prone to internal failure as landfills suffer large internal movements as waste decomposes unevenly and thus buckles and distorts pipes. If a leachate collection system fails, leachate levels will slowly build in a site and may even over-top the containing membrane and flow out into the environment. Rising leachate levels can also wet waste masses that have previously been dry, triggering further active decomposition and leachate generation. Thus, what appears to be a stabilised and inactive site can become re-activated and restart significant gas production and exhibit significant changes in finished ground levels.

== Re-injection into landfill ==
One method of leachate management that was more common in uncontained sites was leachate re-circulation, in which leachate was collected and re-injected into the waste mass. This process greatly accelerated decomposition and therefore gas production and had the impact of converting some leachate volume into landfill gas and reducing the overall volume of leachate for disposal. However, it also tended to increase substantially the concentrations of contaminant materials, making it a more difficult waste to treat.

== Treatment ==
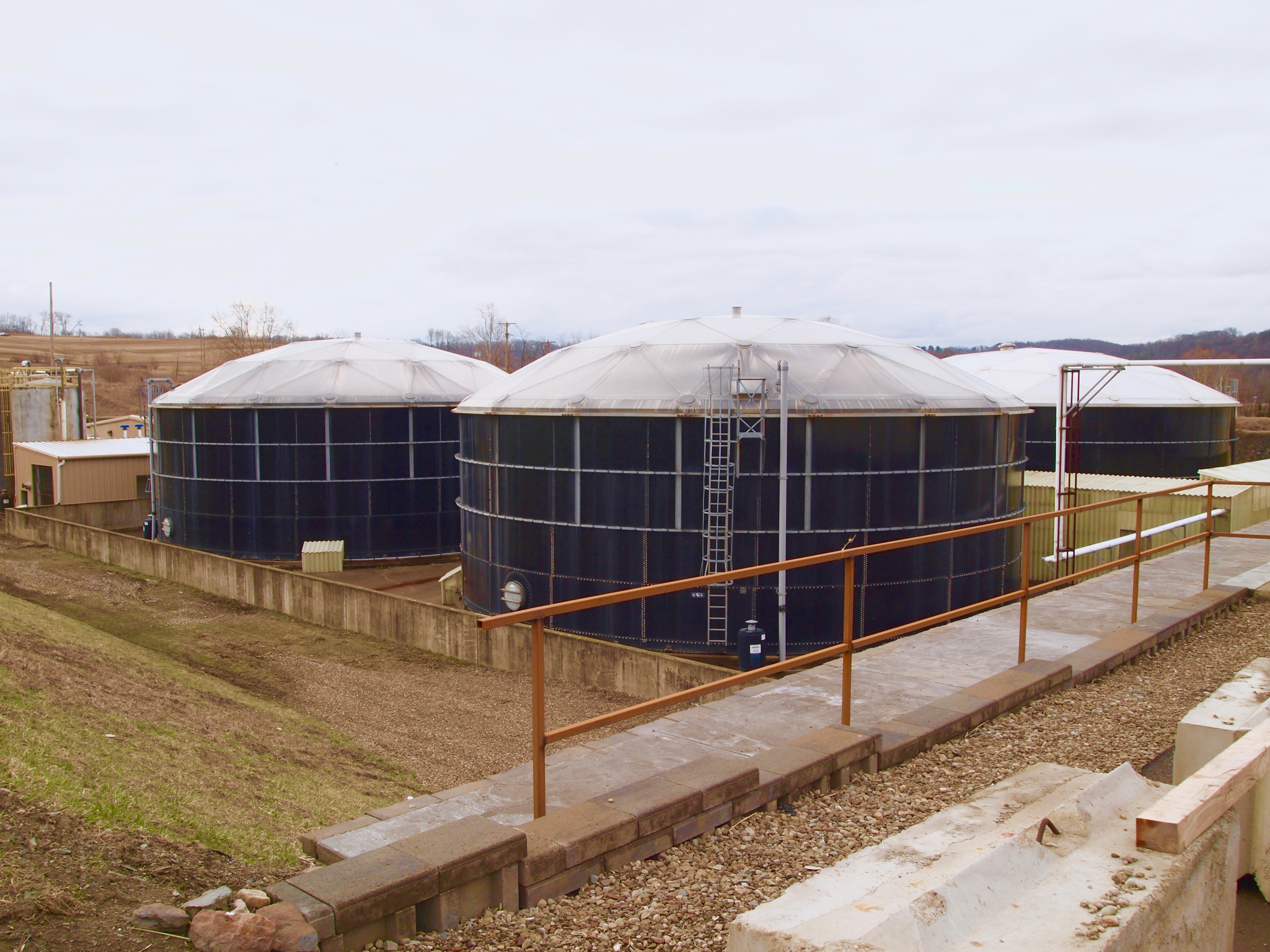
Leachate processing / equalization tanks used in leachate treatment before releasing to a river.

The most common method of handling collected leachate is on-site treatment. When treating leachate on-site, the leachate is pumped from the sump into the treatment tanks. The leachate may then be mixed with chemical reagents to modify the pH and to coagulate and settle solids and to reduce the concentration of hazardous matter. Traditional treatment involved a modified form of activated sludge to substantially reduce the dissolved organic content. Nutrient imbalance can cause difficulties in maintaining an effective biological treatment stage. The treated liquid is rarely of sufficient quality to be released to the environment and may be tankered or piped to a local sewage treatment facility; the decision depends on the age of the landfill and on the limit of water quality that must be achieved after treatment. With high conductivity, leachate is hard to treat with biological treatment or chemical treatment.

Treatment with reverse osmosis is also limited, resulting in low recoveries and fouling of the RO membranes. Reverse osmosis applicability is limited by conductivity, organics, and scaling inorganic elements such as CaSO_{4}, Si, and Ba.

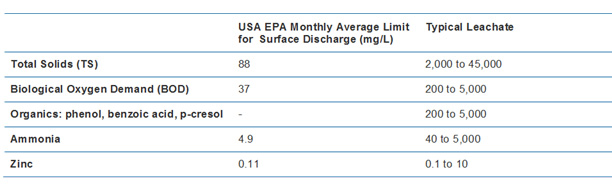
USA EPA monthly average discharge limits for surface discharge of landfill leachate and typical leachate characteristics.

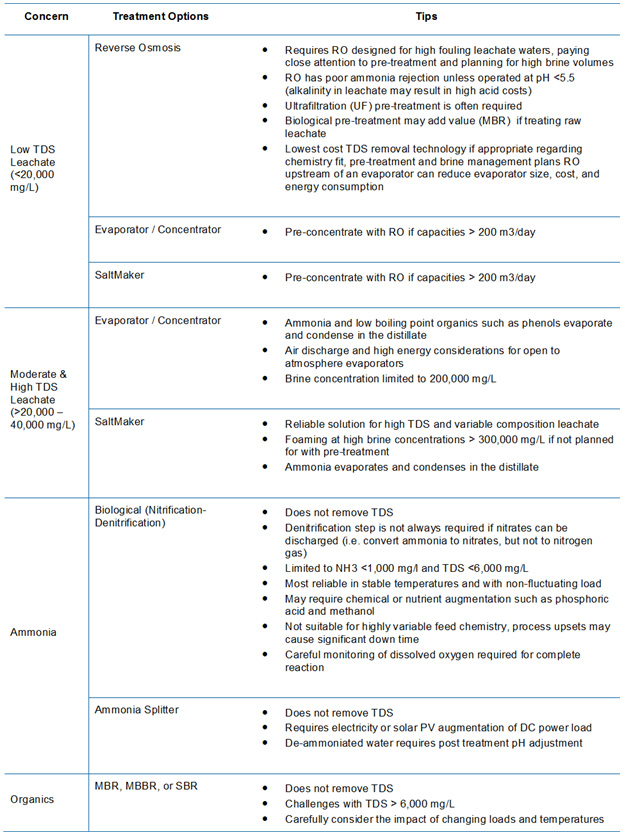
Typical landfill leachate treatment options and tips for different leachate types.

== Removal to sewer system ==
In some older landfills, leachate was directed to the sewers, but this can cause a number of problems. Toxic metals from leachate passing through the sewage treatment plant concentrate in the sewage sludge, making it difficult or dangerous to dispose of the sludge without incurring a risk to the environment. In Europe, regulations and controls have improved in recent decades, and toxic wastes are now no longer permitted to be disposed of in the Municipal Solid Waste landfills, and in most developed countries the metals problem has diminished. Paradoxically, however, as sewage treatment plant discharges are being improved throughout Europe and many other countries, the plant operators are finding that leachates are difficult waste streams to treat. This is because leachates contain very high ammoniacal nitrogen concentrations, are usually very acidic, are often anoxic and, if received in large volumes relative to the incoming sewage flow, lack the phosphorus needed to prevent nutrient starvation for the biological communities that perform the sewage treatment processes. The result is that leachates are a difficult-to-treat waste stream.

However, within ageing municipal solid waste landfills, this may not be a problem as the pH returns close to neutral after the initial stage of acidogenic leachate decomposition. Many sewer undertakers limit maximum ammoniacal nitrogen concentration in their sewers to 250 mg/L to protect sewer maintenance workers, as the WHO's maximum occupational safety limit would be exceeded at above pH 9 to 10, which is often the highest pH allowed in sewer discharges.

Many older leachate streams also contained a variety of synthetic organic species and their decomposition products, some of which had the potential to be acutely damaging to the environment.

== Environmental impact ==
The risks from waste leachate are due to its high organic contaminant concentrations and high concentration of ammonia. Pathogenic microorganisms that might be present in it are often cited as the most important, but pathogenic organism counts reduce rapidly with time in the landfill, so this only applies to the freshest leachate. Toxic substances may, however, be present in variable concentrations, and their presence is related to the nature of the waste deposited.

Most landfills containing organic material will produce methane, some of which dissolves in the leachate. This could, in theory, be released in poorly ventilated areas in the treatment plant. All plants in Europe must now be assessed under the EU ATEX Directive and zoned where explosion risks are identified to prevent future accidents. The most important requirement is the prevention of the discharge of dissolved methane from untreated leachate into public sewers, and most sewage treatment authorities limit the permissible discharge concentration of dissolved methane to 0.14 mg/L, or 1/10 of the lower explosive limit. This entails methane stripping from the leachate.

The greatest environmental risks occur in the discharges from older sites constructed before modern engineering standards became mandatory and also from sites in the developing world where modern standards have not been applied. There are also substantial risks from illegal sites and ad-hoc sites used by organizations outside the law to dispose of waste materials. Leachate streams running directly into the aquatic environment have both an acute and chronic impact on the environment, which may be very severe and can severely diminish bio-diversity and greatly reduce populations of sensitive species. Where toxic metals and organics are present this can lead to chronic toxin accumulation in both local and far distant populations. Rivers impacted by leachate are often yellow in appearance and often support severe overgrowths of sewage fungus.

The contemporary research in the field of assessment techniques and remedial technology of environmental issues originating from landfill leachate has been reviewed in an article published in Critical Reviews in Environmental Science and Technology journal.

A possible ecological threat for the aquatic environment due to the occurrence of organic micropollutants in raw and treated landfill leachates has also been reported.

== Problems and failures ==
Leachate collection systems can experience many problems including clogging with mud or silt. Bioclogging can be exacerbated by the growth of micro-organisms in the conduit. The conditions in leachate collection systems are ideal for micro-organisms to multiply. Chemical reactions in the leachate may also cause clogging through generation of solid residues. The chemical composition of leachate can weaken pipe walls, which may then fail.
