= Terram =

- Industry: Geosynthetics, Geotextiles
- Founded: 1969
- Headquarters: Maldon, Essex, United Kingdom
- Products: Geosynthetics, Geotextiles, Geocells, Geocomposites, Permeable Paving, Porous Pavers, Grass Reinforcement Mesh
- Owner: Berry Global
- Number of employees: ~100
- Website: http://www.terram.com/ https://www.BerryGlobal.com/

Terram is part of the Berry Global group, and has its manufacturing headquarters in Maldon, Essex, United Kingdom, supplying geosynthetics materials to the worldwide civil engineering & construction industry. The company was founded in the late 1960s as part of ICI Fibres, and is now part of Berry Global, a supplier of nonwoven materials. Terram Geosynthetics are manufactured under the name Fiberweb Geosynthetics Limited.

The company supplies geotextiles for roads and highway construction, rail trackbed construction, coastal defences, flood defence, slope and soil stabilisation, SuDs source control paving solutions and a specialist range of geosynthetics for the rail industry, drainage composites for structural and waste management drainage systems.

== Locations ==
The Terram production plant is located in the Maldon, Essex UK and supports global sales and supplies distributors in over 60 countries. Product supply is complemented by production from its sister companies in North America (Typar geotextiles) and India (Terram Geosynthetics Pvt Ltd)
