= Polypropylene raffia =

Packaging material made from weaving ribbons of polypropylene

Polypropylene raffia, or PP raffia is a packaging material made from weaving ribbons of oriented polypropylene. It is named after the raffia palm, which the packaging emulates to some extent. Polypropylene raffia is considered to be a "widely used material for atmospheric capture".

== See also ==
- Geotextile
