= Geosynthetic clay liner =

Type of hydraulic barrier

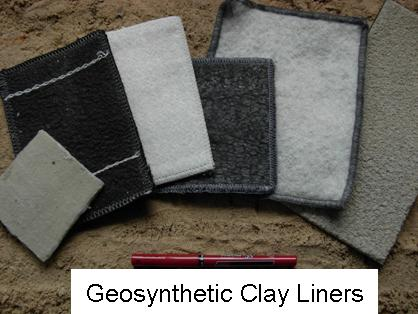
Different types of fabric used for geosynthetic clay liners

Geosynthetic clay liners (GCLs) are factory manufactured hydraulic barriers consisting of a layer of bentonite or other very low-permeability material supported by geotextiles and/or geomembranes, mechanically held together by needling, stitching, or chemical adhesives. Due to environmental laws, any seepage from landfills must be collected and properly disposed of, otherwise contamination of the surrounding ground water could cause major environmental and/or ecological problems. The lower the hydraulic conductivity the more effective the GCL will be at retaining seepage inside of the landfill. Bentonite composed predominantly (>70%) of montmorillonite or other expansive clays, are preferred and most commonly used in GCLs. A general GCL construction would consist of two layers of geosynthetics stitched together enclosing a layer of natural or processed sodium bentonite. Typically, woven and/or non-woven textile geosynthetics are used, however polyethylene or geomembrane layers or geogrid geotextiles materials have also been incorporated into the design or in place of a textile layer to increase strength. GCLs are produced by several large companies in North America, Europe, and Asia. The United States Environmental Protection Agency currently regulates landfill construction and design in the US through several legislations.

== History ==
The origin of GCLs can be traced back to 1962 when Arthur G. Clem filed a patent for preformed moisture impervious panels which combined bentonite clay with corrugated paperboard. In 1982, Arthur J. Clem filed a patent for a what would today be recognized as a GCL which combined bentonite clay, adhesive, and a geotextile. In that same year, Arthur J. Clem established Clem Environmental Corp to put his invention into production. The use of GCLs as a separate category of geosynthetics appears to have been in the United States in 1988 in solid waste containment as a backup to a geomembrane. The product was Claymax which is bentonite mixed with an adhesive so as to bond the clay between two geotextiles; one below (the carrier textile) and the other above (the cover textile) the bentonite in the center. About the same time a different product in Germany, Bentofix, was manufactured by placing bentonite powder between two geotextiles and then needle punching the three-components system together. The needle punching method of manufacture (US patent filed in 1989) gave the resulting composite material shear strength, a critical feature for installation on slopes.

== Other names ==
Other names used for GCLs since their initiation are "clay blankets", "bentonite blankets", "bentonite mats", "prefabricated bentonite clay blankets" and "clay geosynthetic barriers", the latter currently favored by the International Organization for Standardization (ISO).

== Function ==
The engineering function of a GCL is containment as a hydraulic barrier to water, leachate or other liquids and sometimes gases. As such, they are used as replacements for either compacted clay liners or geomembranes, or they are used in a composite manner to augment the more traditional liner materials. The ultimate in liner security is probably a three component composite geomembrane/geosynthetic clay liner/compacted clay liner which has seen use as a landfill liner on many occasions.

Differences between geosynthetic clay liners (GCL) and compacted clay liners (CCL)
Characteristic	Geosynthetic Clay Liners (GCL)	Compacted Clay Liners (CCL)
Material	Bentonite clay, adhesives, geotextiles and/or geomembranes	Native soils or blends of soil and bentonite clay
Construction	Factory manufactured and then installed in the field	Construction and/or amended in the field
Thickness	~ 6 mm	300 to 900 mm
Hydraulic conductivity of clay	10^{−10} to 10^{−12} m/s	10^{−9} to 10^{−10} m/s
Speed and ease of construction	Rapid, simple installation	Slow, delicate and complicated compaction works
Installed cost	$0.05 to $0.10 per m^{2}	Highly variable (estimated range $0.07 to $0.30 per m^{2})
Experience	Construction quality assurance and quality control are critical	Highly workforce dependent
