= Geotextiles and Geomembranes =

- Discipline: Geosynthetics
- Language: English
- Edited by: Chung-Sik Yoo

Publication details
- History: 1984-present
- Publisher: Elsevier
- Frequency: Bimonthly
- Impact factor: 5.292 (2020)

Standard abbreviations
- ISO 4: Geotext. Geomembr.

Indexing
- ISSN: 0266-1144
- OCLC no.: 780551741

Links
- Journal homepage; Online access; Journal page at society website

Geotextiles and Geomembranes is a bimonthly peer-reviewed scientific journal. It is the official journal of the International Geosynthetics Society and published on their behalf by Elsevier. The journal covers all topics relating to geosynthetics, including research, behaviour, performance analysis, testing, design, construction methods, case histories, and field experience.

== Abstracting and indexing ==
The journal is abstracted and indexed in:

- Current Contents/Engineering, Computing & Technology
- GEOBASE
- Geographical Abstracts: Physical Geography
- Geological Abstracts
- Scopus
- Science Citation Index Expanded

According to the Journal Citation Reports, the journal has a 2020 impact factor of 5.292.

== See also ==
- Geotechnical engineering
