= Geofoam =

Construction material

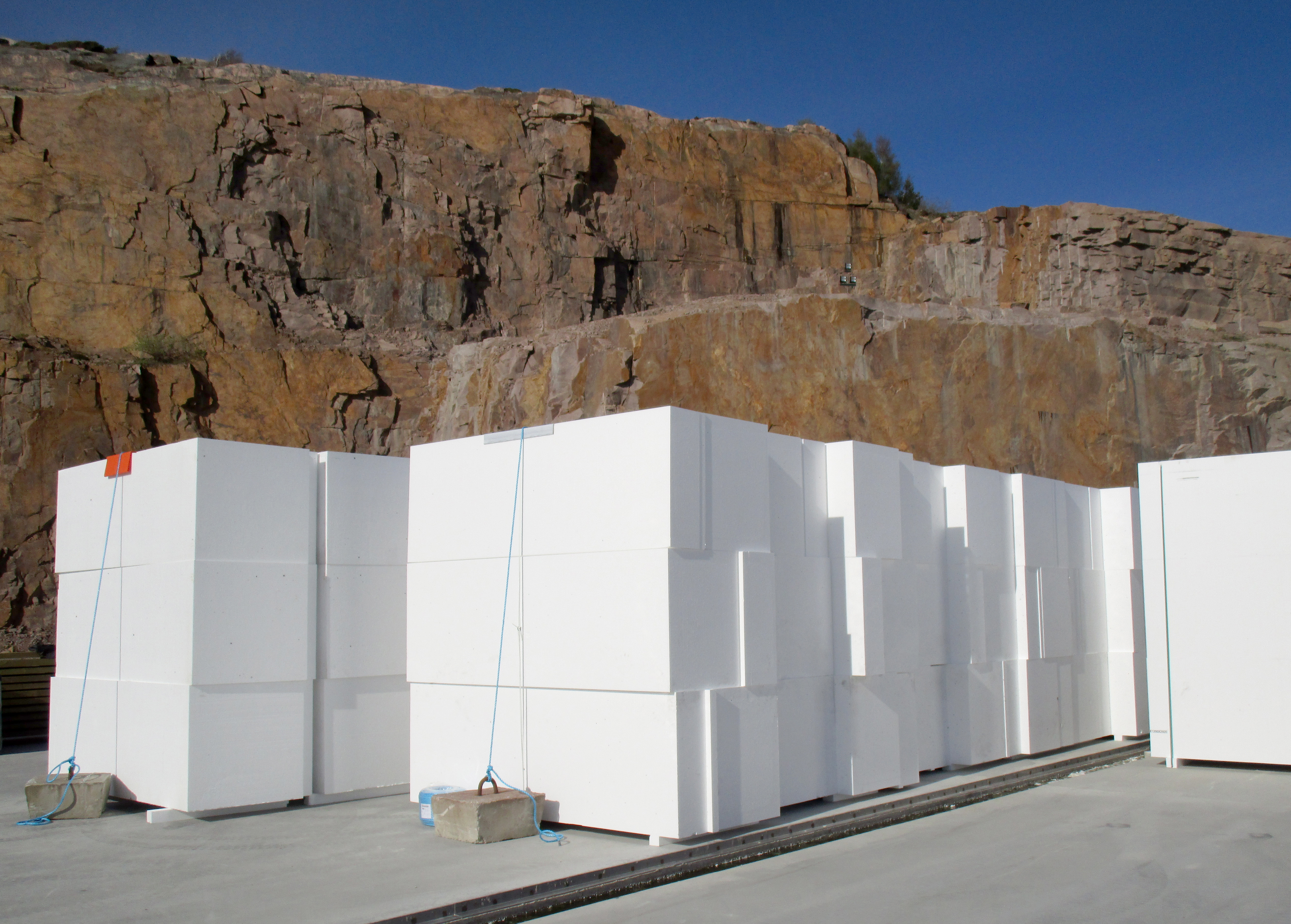
Stacked blocks of geofoam at a construction site

Geofoam is expanded polystyrene (EPS) or extruded polystyrene (XPS) manufactured into large lightweight blocks. The blocks vary in size but are often 2 m × 0.75 m × 0.75 m (6.6 ft × 2.5 ft × 2.5 ft). The primary function of geofoam is to provide a lightweight void fill below a highway, bridge approach, embankment or parking lot. EPS Geofoam minimizes settlement on underground utilities. Geofoam is also used in much broader applications, including lightweight fill, green roof fill, compressible inclusions, thermal insulation, and (when appropriately formed) drainage.

Geofoam shares principles with geocombs (previously called ultralight cellular structures) which has been defined as "any manufactured material created by an extrusion process that results in a final product that consists of numerous open-ended tubes that are glued, bonded, fused or otherwise bundled together." The cross-sectional geometry of an individual tube typically has a simple geometric shape (circle, ellipse, hexagon, octagon, etc.) and is on the order of 25 mm (0.98 in) across. The overall cross-section of the assemblage of bundled tubes resembles a honeycomb that gives it its name. Presently, only rigid polymers (polypropylene and PVC) have been used as geocomb material.

== History ==
The first use of EPS Geofoam was in Oslo, Norway, in 1972. Geofoam was used in the embankments around the Flom Bridge in an effort to reduce settlements. Prior to installing geofoam, this area experienced 20–30 centimeters of settlement annually causing extreme roadway damage.

Due to the success of the Oslo geofoam project, the first International Geofoam Conference was held in Oslo, Norway, in 1985 for engineers to exchange knowledge, research results, share new applications, and discuss case histories. Since then, two more conferences were held in Tokyo, Japan, and Salt Lake City, US, in 1996 and 2001, respectively. The most recent conference was held in June 2011 in Lillestrom, Norway.

Between 1985 and 1987, Japan used over 1,300,000 m^{3} (46,000,000 ft^{3}) of geofoam in 2,000 projects. Testing and use of geofoam in these projects demonstrated the potential advantages of geofoam as a lightweight fill. For example, Geofoam was placed beneath runways in Japanese airports, proving the material can sustain heavy and repeated pressure.

Geofoam was first used in the United States in 1989 on Highway 160 between Durango and Mancos, Colorado. An increase in rainfall caused a landslide, destroying part of the highway. Geofoam was used to create highway side slope stabilization to prevent any similar issues. The use of geofoam versus conventional restoration resulted in an 84% reduction to the total cost of the project.

The largest geofoam project in the United States took place from 1997 to 2001 on Interstate 15 in Salt Lake City, Utah. Geofoam was chosen to minimize that amount of utilities that would need to be relocated or remodeled for the project. A total of 3,530,000 ft^{3} (100,000 m^{3}) of geofoam was used, and approximately $450,000 was saved by eliminating the need to relocate utility poles. Geofoam was also used in embankments and bridge abutments for base stability. Subsequently, because of the success of usage of geofoam for the I-15 Reconstruction Project, the Utah Transit Authority has used geofoam embankment for its light rail (i.e., TRAX) and commuter rail lines (i.e., FrontRunner).

From 2009 to 2012, a Vaudreuil-based expanded polymer manufacturing company provided over 625,000 m^{3} (22,100,000 ft^{3}) of geofoam for a new segment of highway 30 in the province of Quebec, in the Montreal area, making it the largest geofoam project in North America to date.

Since 2016, Geofoam is extensively used in the construction of the new elevated highway 15 and Turcot interchange in Montreal.

== Applications ==
A brief summary of applications can be found at:

=== Slope stabilization ===
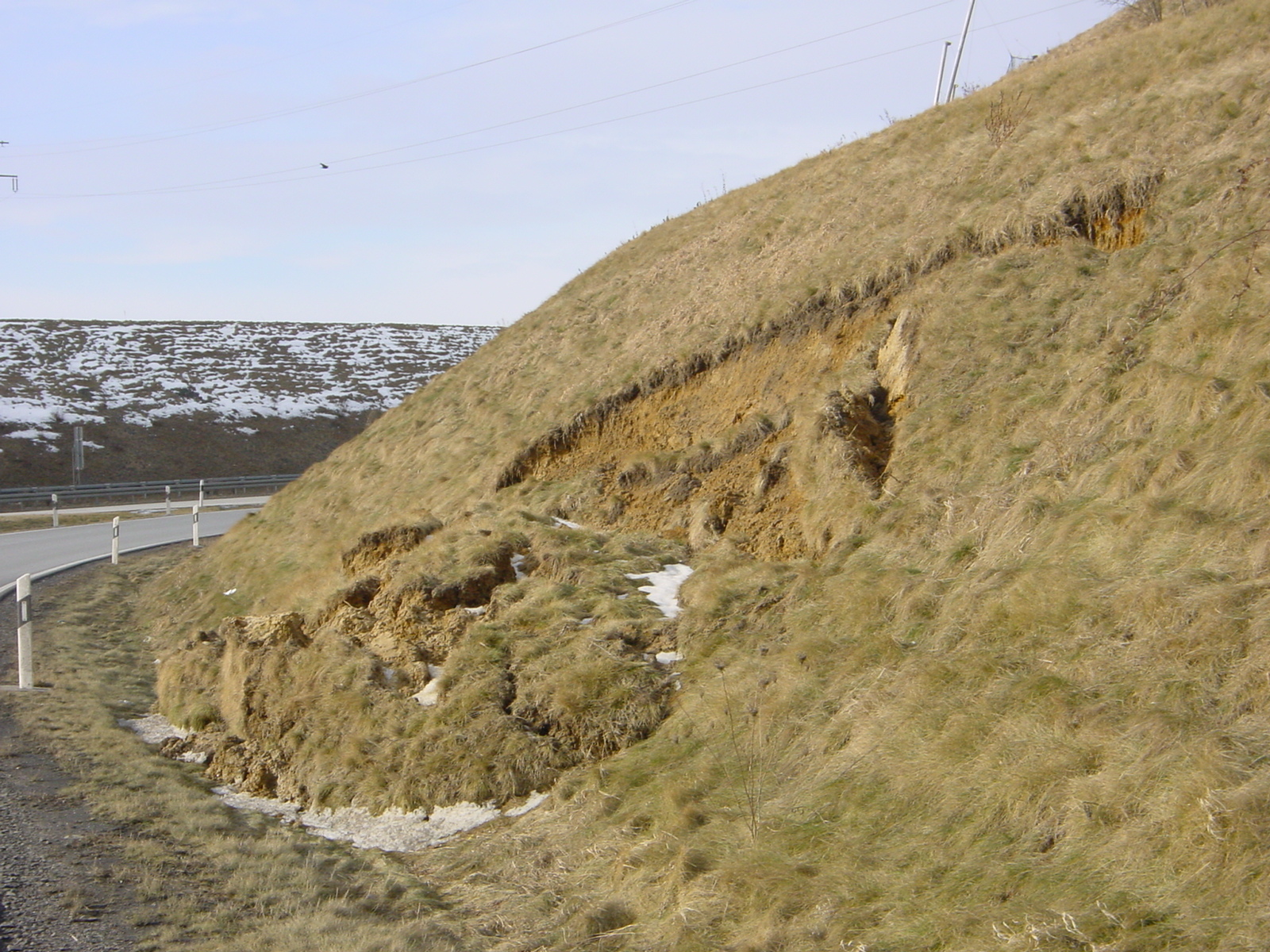
Landslide

Slope stabilization is the use of geofoam in order to reduce the mass and gravitational force in an area that may be subject to failure, such as a landslide. Geofoam is up to 50 times lighter than other traditional fills with similar compressive strengths. This allows geofoam to maximize the available right-of-way on an embankment. Geofoam's light weight and ease of installation reduces construction time and labor costs.

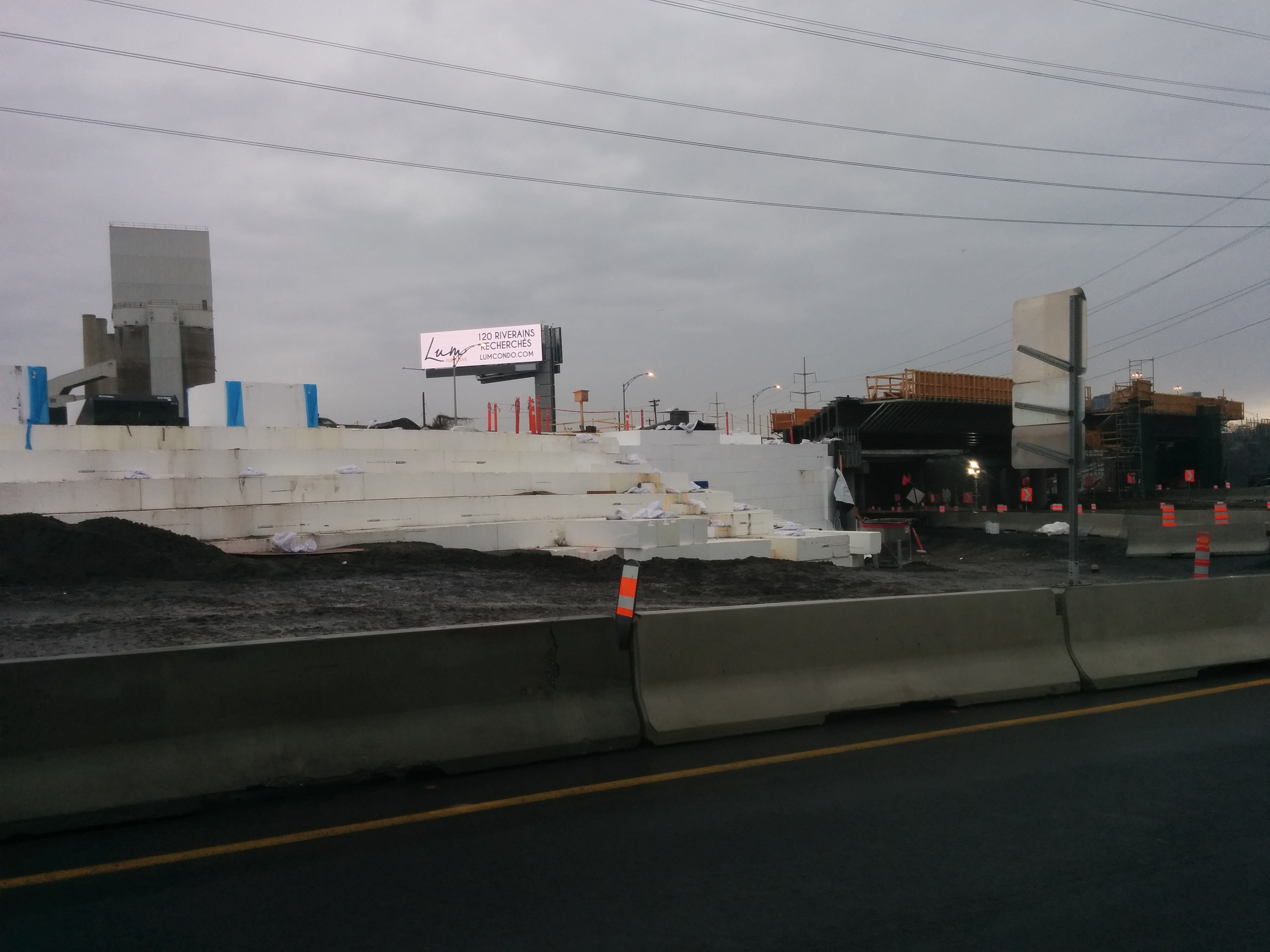
Geofoam is used as lightweight earthworks to build a bridge overpass on weak soil near Montreal

=== Embankments ===
Embankments using geofoam allow for a great reduction in necessary side slopes compared to typical fills. Reducing the side slope of the embankment can increase the usable space on either side. These embankments can also be built upon soils affected by differential settlement without being affected. Maintenance costs associated with geofoam embankments are significantly lower when compared to embankments using natural soil.

=== Reduced digging ===
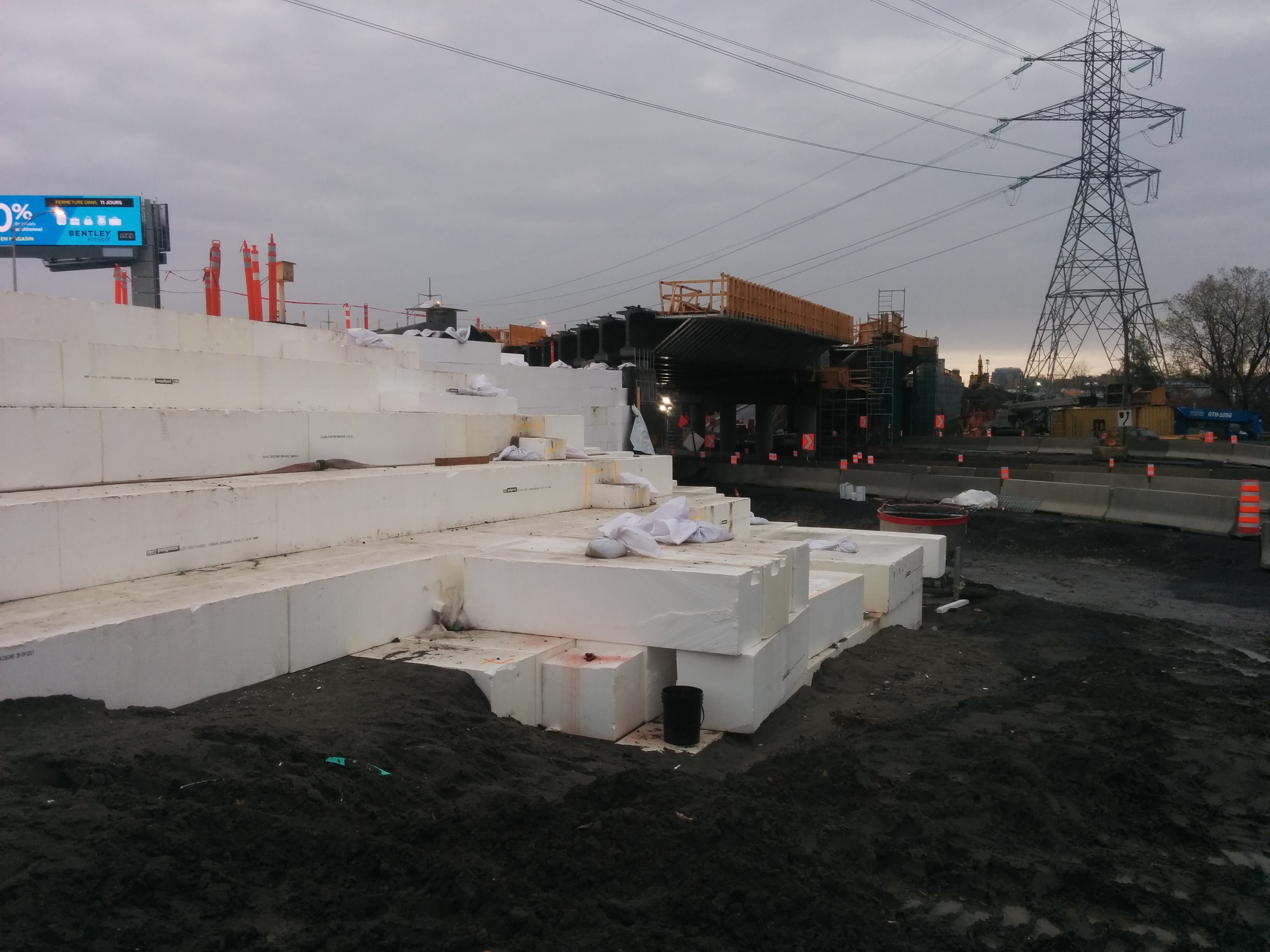
Geofoam is used as core filling inside of a car bridge near Montreal

Some weak and soft soil cannot support the weight of the desired structure; an overpass bridge on the nearby picture. If it was built out of traditional earthwork filling, it would have been too heavy and deform the weak soil underneath and damage the bridge. To reduce costs by not digging into the bedrock, geofoam is used for the interior filling of the bridge

=== Retaining structures ===
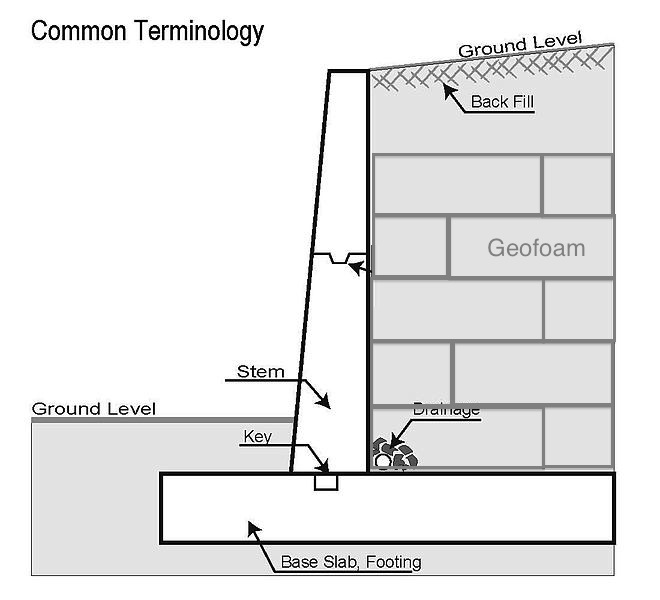
Geofoam used in retaining wall

Using geofoam for retaining structures provides a reduction in lateral pressure as well as preventing settlement and improving waterproofing. Geofoam's light weight will reduce the lateral force on a retaining wall or abutment. It is important to install a draining system under the geofoam to prevent problems with built-up hydrostatic pressure or buoyancy.

=== Utility protection ===
Utility Protection is possible by using geofoam to reduce the vertical stresses on pipes and other sensitive utilities. Reducing the weight on top of a utility by using geofoam instead of a typical soil prevents utilities from potential issues, such as collapses.

=== Pavement insulation ===
Pavement insulation is the use of geofoam under pavement where pavement thickness can be controlled by frost heave conditions. Using geofoam as a sub-grade insulation element will decrease this differential thickness. Geofoam is 98% air by volume, making it an effective thermal insulator. Proper installation of geofoam is especially important as gaps between geofoam blocks will work against geofoam's insulating effects.

== Advantages ==
Advantages of using geofoam include:

- Low density/high strength: Geofoam is 1% to 2% the density of soil with equal strength.
- Predictable behavior: Geofoam allows engineers to be much more specific in the design criteria. This is very different than other lightweight fillers, such as soil, that can be very variable in composition.
- Inert: Geofoam will not break down, so it will not spread into surrounding soils. This means that geofoam will not pollute the surrounding soil. Geofoam can also be dug up and reused.
- Decreases construction time: Geofoam is quick to install and can be installed during any type of weather, resulting in faster installation time.

== Disadvantages ==
Disadvantages of using geofoam include:

- Fire hazards: Untreated geofoam is a fire hazard.
- Vulnerable to petroleum solvents: If geofoam comes in contact with a petroleum solvent, it will immediately turn into a glue-type substance, making it unable to support any load.
- Buoyancy: Forces developed because of buoyancy can result in a dangerous uplift force. Cars were crushed against the ceiling after floodwaters raised polystyrene below the floor of a car park in Crayford on 9 October 2016.
- Susceptible to insect damage: Geofoam can be treated to resist insect infestation. When geofoam is used for insulating buildings where wood is present damage to the geofoam can be limited by use of insect treatment. On the other hand, in traditional lightweight fill for road construction no known evidence of insect damage has been documented.

== Specifications ==
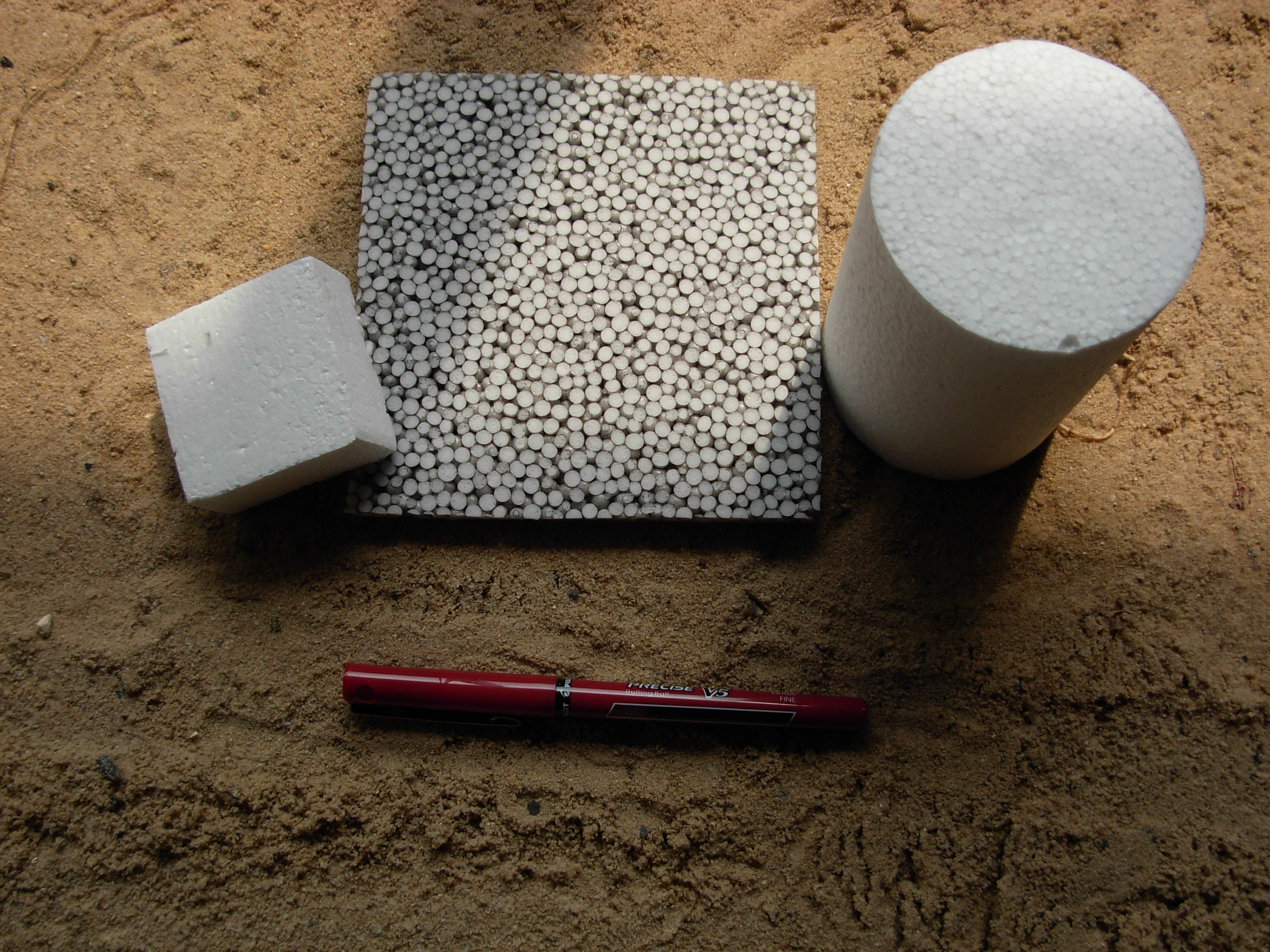
Geofoam

Physical Properties of EPS Geofoam
TYPE – ASTM D6817	EPS12	EPS15	EPS19	EPS22	EPS29
Density, min. kg/m^{3}	11.2	14.4	18.4	21.6	28.8
Compressive Strength, min., kPa at 1%	15	25	40	50	75
Compressive Strength min., kPa at 5%	35	55	90	115	170
Compressive Strength min., kPa at 10%	40	70	110	135	200
Flexural Strength, min., kpa	69	172	207	276	345
Oxygen index, min., volume %	24.0	24.0	24.0	24.0	24.0

Physical Properties of XPS Geofoam
TYPE – ASTM D6817	XPS20	XPS21	XPS26	XPS29	XPS36	XPS48
Density, min. kg/m^{3}	19.2	20.8	25.6	28.8	35.2	48.0
Compressive Strength, min., kPa at 1%	20	35	75	105	160	280
Compressive Strength min., kPa at 5%	85	110	185	235	335	535
Compressive Strength min., kPa at 10%	104	104	173	276	414	690
Flexural Strength, min., kpa	276	276	345	414	517	689
Oxygen index, min., volume %	24.0	24.0	24.0	24.0	24.0	24.0

== See also ==
- Geosynthetics
- Civil engineering
