= Geocomposite =

Composite material made of multiple geosynthetic components

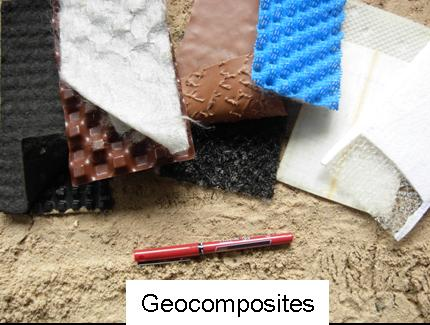
^{<--1st-5th edition published by 3rd-party publisher, 6th edition published by self-publication company (Xlibris, same author)-->}

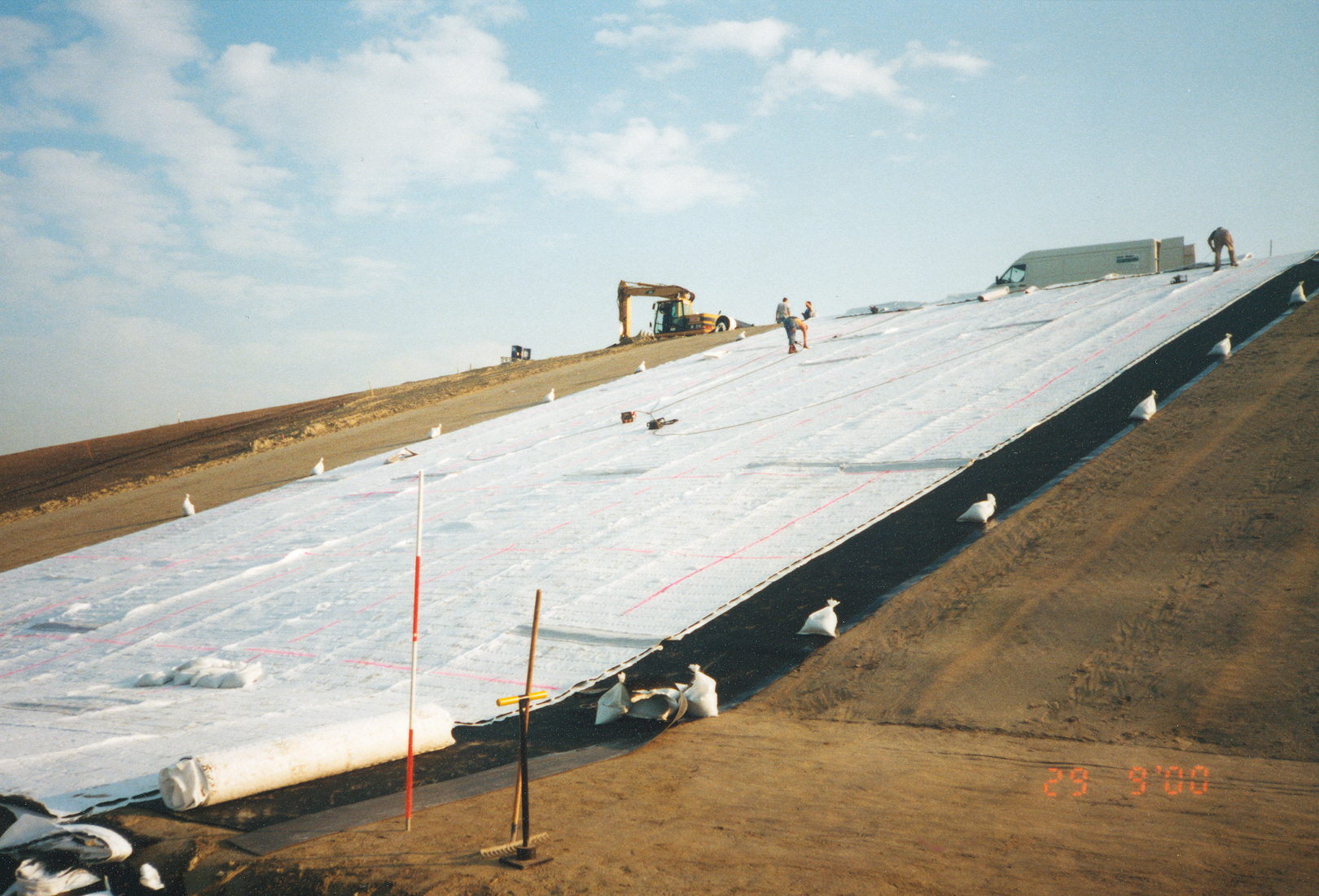
Installation of a geocomposite drain. Geocomposite drains are often used on steep slopes of landfill capping systems.

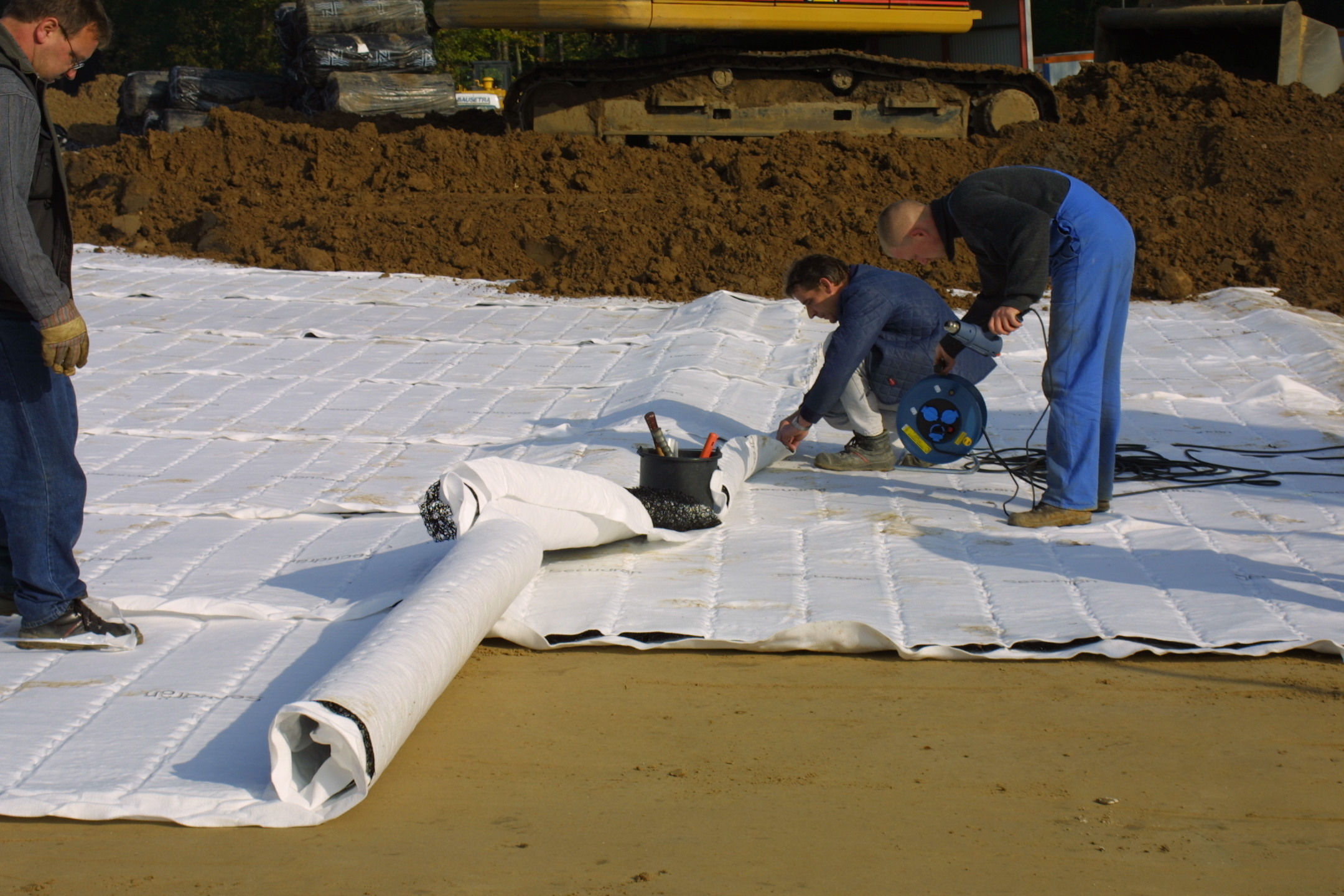
Installation of a geocomposite drain.

Geocomposites are combinations of two or more geosynthetic materials for civil engineering applications that perform multiple geosynthetic functions; the five basic functions are: separation, reinforcement, filtration, drainage, and containment. Such composite materials may enhance technical properties of the soil or the geotechnical structure and minimize application costs.

== Geotextile-geonet composites ==
When a geotextile is used on one or both sides of a geonet, the separation and filtration functions are always satisfied, but the drainage function is vastly improved in comparison to geotextiles by themselves. Such geocomposites are regularly used in intercepting and conveying leachate in landfill liner and cover systems and for conducting vapor or water beneath pond liners of various types. These drainage geocomposites also make effective drains to intercept water in a capillary zone where frost heave or salt migration is a problem. In all cases, the liquid enters through the geotextile and then travels horizontally within the geonet to a suitable exit.

== Multi-linear drainage composites ==
A manufactured product composed of a series of parallel single drainage conduits (like perforated mini-pipes) regularly spaced across the width of the product and sandwiched between two or more geosynthetics (more often geotextiles). They are used for liquid drainage or gas collection while providing a separation and filtration function. Such multi-linear drainage composites are not susceptible to creep in compression or geotextile intrusion when confined in the soil, which means that they maintain their flow capacity over time, even under heavy loads. These drainage geocomposites are regularly used in landfill applications for leachate collection layers and cover systems, and in buildings for sub-slab depressurization systems to collect toxic gases (Radon, VOCs, etc.) and prevent their migration into the building.

== Geotextile-geomembrane composites ==
Geotextiles can be laminated on one or both sides of a geomembrane for a number of purposes. The geotextiles provide increased resistance to puncture, tear propagation, and friction related to sliding, as well as providing tensile strength in and of themselves. Geotextiles are of heavy and are of the nonwoven, needle-punched variety. In such cases the geotextile component acts as a drainage medium, since it can conduct water, leachate or gases away from direct contact with the geomembrane.

== Geotextile-geogrid composites ==
A needle-punched nonwoven geotextile bonded to a geogrid provides in-plane drainage while the geogrid provides tensile reinforcement. Such geotextile-geogrid composites are used for internal drainage of low-permeability backfill soils for reinforced walls and slopes. The synergistic properties of each component enhance the characteristics of the final product.

== Geotextile-polymer core composites ==
A core in the form of a quasi-rigid plastic sheet, it can be extruded or deformed in such a way as to allow very large quantities of liquid to flow within its structure; it thus acts as a drainage core. The core must be protected by a geotextile, acting as a filter and separator, on one or both sides. Various systems are available, each focused on a particular application.

- The first type is known as wick drains in the U.S. and prefabricated vertical drains (PVDs) in Europe. The 100mm wide by 5mm thick polymer cores are often fluted for ease of conducting water. A geotextile acting as a filter and separator is socked around the core. The emergence of such wick drains, or PVDs, has all but eliminated traditional sand drains as a rapid means of consolidating fine-grained saturated cohesive soils.
- The second type is in the form of drainage panels, the rigid polymer core being nubbed, columned, dimpled or a three-dimensional net. With a geotextile on one side it makes an effective drain on the backfilled side of retaining walls, basement walls and plaza decks. The cores are sometimes vacuum formed dimples or stiff 3-D meshes. As with wick drains, the geotextile is the filter/separator and the thick polymer core is the drain. Many systems of this type are available, the latest addition having a thin pliable geomembrane on the side facing the wall and functioning as a vapor barrier.
- The third type within this area of drainage geocomposites is the category of prefabricated edge drains. These materials, typically 500 mm high by 20 to 30 mm wide are placed adjacent to a highway pavement, airfield pavement, or railroad right-of-way, for lateral drainage out of and away from the pavement section. The systems are cost-effective and can be installed quickly.
