= Geonets =

A geonet is a geosynthetic material similar in structure to a geogrid, consisting of integrally connected parallel sets of ribs overlying similar sets at various angles for in-plane drainage of liquids or gases. Geonets are often laminated with geotextiles on one or both surfaces and are then referred to as drainage geocomposites. They are competitive with other drainage geocomposites having different core configurations.

== Manufacturing ==
Geonets are formed by a continuous extrusion process into a netlike configuration of parallel sets of homogeneously interconnected ribs. There are three categories of geonets. The following are illustrated:

- Biplanar geonets: These are the original and most common types and consist of two sets of intersecting ribs at different angles and spacings. The ribs themselves are of different sizes and shapes for different styles.
- Triplanar geonets: These have parallel central ribs with smaller sets of ribs above and beneath mainly for geometric stability.
- Other geonets: These newer geonet structures have either box shaped channels or protruding columns from an underlying support network.

Each of the above categories have variations within themselves (mainly thickness) and new product development by various manufacturers is quite active.

All geonets that are currently available are made from polyethylene resin. The density varies from 0.94 to 0.96 mg/L, with the higher values forming the more rigid products. In this regard, the resin is true high-density polyethylene (HDPE) unlike the density used in HDPE geomembranes that is really medium density. The resin is formulated with 2.0 to 2.5% carbon black (usually in a concentrated form mixed with a polyethylene carrier resin), and 0.25 to 0.75% additives that serve as processing aids and anti-oxidants.

While quite different in the manufacture or configuration than geonets are competitive geosynthetic products called geospacers. Their drainage cores consists of nubs, columns, cuspations, or 3-D networks of stiff polymer strands. They are generally used for drainage behind retaining walls, plaza decks or green roofs.

Various categories of geonets.

== Properties ==
Since the primary function of a geonet is to convey liquid within the plane of its structure, the in-plane hydraulic flow rate, or transmissivity, is of paramount importance. However, other features, which may influence this value over the service lifetime of the geonet, are also of importance. Thus, a number of physical, mechanical, endurance, and environmental properties will also be mentioned.

=== Physical properties ===
The tests for physical properties are either covered in ASTM, ISO or GRI Standards.

- density or specific gravity
- mass per unit area (weight)
- rib dimensions
- planar angles
- junction characteristics
- aperture size and shape

=== Mechanical properties ===
- tensile strength and elongation
- compression strength and deformation
- shear strength

=== Hydraulic properties ===
- planar transmisivity

=== Endurance properties ===
- type of resin
- creep behavior
- intrusion of adjacent materials
- extrusion of clay materials

=== Environmental properties ===
A series of environmental related issues can have impact on the flow-rate performance of geonets.

- temperature effects
- permeating liquid properties
- biological growth within geonet structure
- resistance to light and weather

== Theoretical concepts ==
Design-by-function requires the formulation of a factor of safety as follows:

$FS=\frac{\text{allowable (test) value}}{\text{required (design) value}}$

For geonets serving as a drainage medium, the targeted value is flow rate and the above concept becomes:

$FS=\frac{q_{allow}}{q_{reqd}}$

where

a_{allow} = allowable flow rate, and

q_{reqd} = required flow rate

As stated previously, if we desire an alternative to the flow rate, calculations can be based on Darcy's formula (assuming saturated conditions and laminar flow) obtaining the transmissivity, θ. This important concept is repeated.

$q=kiA$

$q=ki(W\times t)$

$q=(kt)iW$

$kt= \mathit{\Theta} = \frac{q}{iW}$

where q = volumetric flow rate (m^{3}/s),

k = coefficient of permeability (m/s),

i = hydraulic gradient (dimensionless),

A = flow cross-section area (m^{2}),

θ = transmissivity (m^{2}/s),

W = width (m), and

t = thickness (m).

As seen in the equation, q/W and θ carry the same units and are directly related to one another by means of the hydraulic gradient i. At a hydraulic gradient of 1.0, they are numerically identical. At all other values of hydraulic gradient they are not equal. Also note that the system should be saturated and flow must be laminar in order to use transmissivity. When in doubt, it is usually best to use flow rate per unit width.

== Construction methods ==
Geonets are supplied in rolls from 2.0 to 6.7 m wide. They should be placed and covered in a timely manner. While UV and heat effects are not as severe in geonets as they are in geotextile (because of thicker ribs in contrast to thin yarns and fibers), it is good practice not to leave the material exposed and subjected to accidental damage or contamination of any variety. Contamination can occur from soil, miscellaneous sediment, construction debris, ingrowing vegetation, and so on.

The rolls are usually placed with their roll directions oriented up-and-down slope, rather than along (or parallel to) them. There are two reasons for this: First, the machine direction has the greatest strength and flow rate; second, such orientation eliminates seams along the flow direction. If triplanar or boxlike channel geonets are being used for their high flow in the machine direction, the proper orientation is critical during placement. For very long slopes or along the base of a facility, flow must continue unimpeded from one geonet to the next. When geotextiles are laminated to the geonet, they must be stripped back from the overlapped area such the upgradient geonet is directly on the downgradient geonet in shingled manner. There can be no geotextile sandwiched within this overlap area.

The seaming or joining of geonets is difficult. Assuming stress does not have to be transferred from one roll to the next, plastic electrical ties, threaded loops, and wires have all been used with a relatively small overlaps of 50 100 mm. Metal hog rings should never be used when geonets are used adjacent to geomembranes. There are questions as to what influence overlapping has on the geonet's flow rate. The connection of geonets to perforated drainage pipes is difficult and extremely important. The geonet's outlet must be free draining at all times even in winter under freezing conditions.

Notwithstanding the above concerns, geonets are very impressive with respect to their flow-rate capability, ease of construction, savings in airspace, and overall economy in many facilities where drainage must be accommodated.
