= Geosynthetics =

Synthetic material used to stabilize terrain

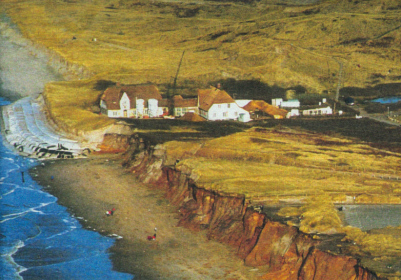
Geotextile sandbags protected the historic house Kliffende on Sylt island against storms, which eroded the cliffs left and right from the sandbag barrier.

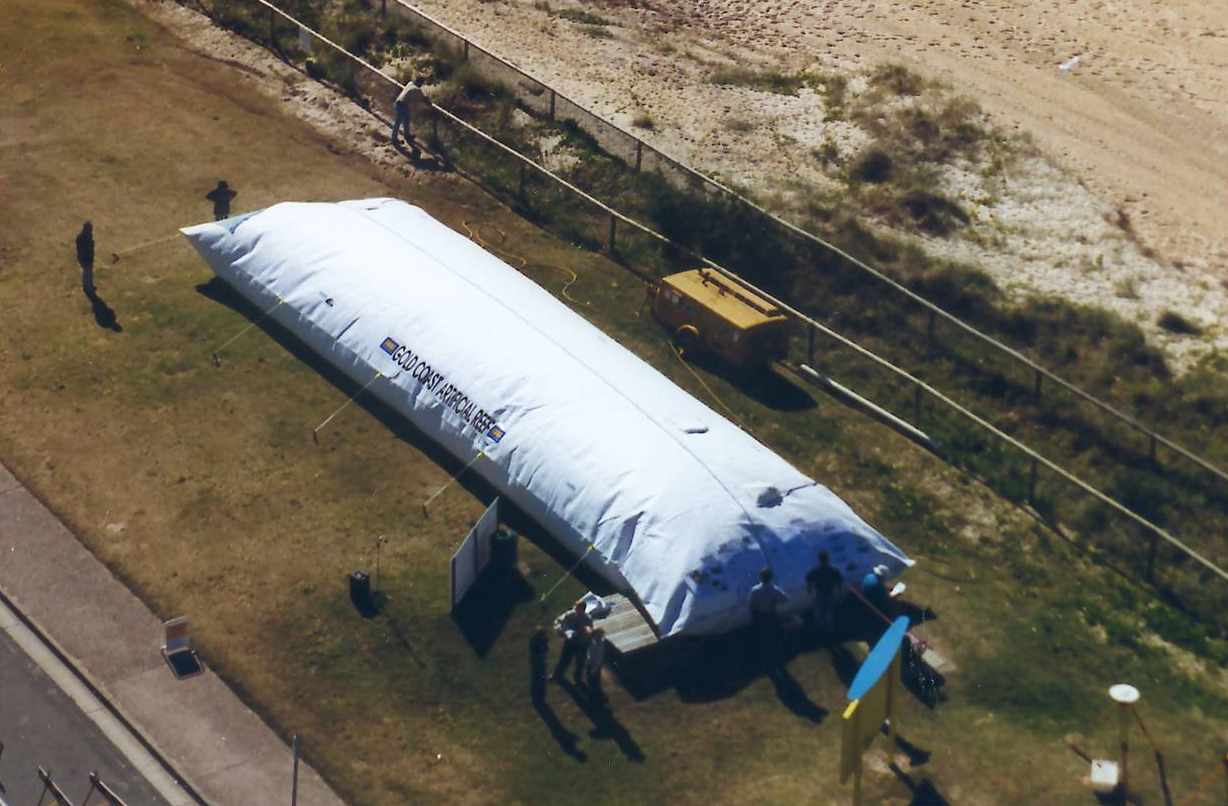
Geotextile sandbags can be approximately 20 m long, such as those used for the artificial reef at Narrow Neck, Queensland.

Geosynthetics are synthetic products used to stabilize terrain, contain liquids, drain liquids, and filter particles. They are generally polymeric products used to solve civil engineering problems. This includes eight main product categories: geotextiles, geogrids, geonets, geomembranes, geosynthetic clay liners, geofoam, geocells and geocomposites. The polymeric nature of the products makes them suitable for use in the ground where high levels of durability are required. They can also be used in exposed applications. Geosynthetics are available in a wide range of forms and materials. These products have a wide range of applications and are currently used in many civil, geotechnical, transportation, geoenvironmental, hydraulic, and private development applications including roads, airfields, railroads, embankments, retaining structures, reservoirs, canals, dams, erosion control, sediment control, landfill liners, landfill covers, mining, aquaculture and agriculture.

== History ==
Inclusions of different sorts mixed with soil have been used for thousands of years. They were used in roadway construction in Roman days to stabilize roadways and their edges. These early attempts were made of natural fibres, fabrics or vegetation mixed with soil to improve road quality, particularly when roads were built on unstable soil. They were also used to build steep slopes as with several pyramids in Egypt and walls as well. A fundamental problem with using natural materials (wood, cotton, etc.) in a buried environment is the biodegradation that occurs from microorganisms in the soil. With the advent of polymers in the middle of the 20th century a much more stable material became available. When properly formulated, lifetimes of centuries can be predicted even for harsh environmental conditions.

Early papers on geosynthetics (as we know them today) in the 1960s documented their use as filters in the United States and as reinforcement in Europe. A 1977 conference in Paris brought together many of the early manufacturers and practitioners. The International Geosynthetics Society (IGS) was founded in 1983 and has subsequently organized a worldwide conference every four years and its numerous chapters have additional conferences. Presently, separate geosynthetic institutes, trade-groups, and standards-setting groups are active. Approximately twenty universities teach stand-alone courses on geosynthetics and almost all include the subject in geotechnical, geoenvironmental, and hydraulic engineering courses. Geosynthetics are available worldwide and the activity is robust and steadily growing.

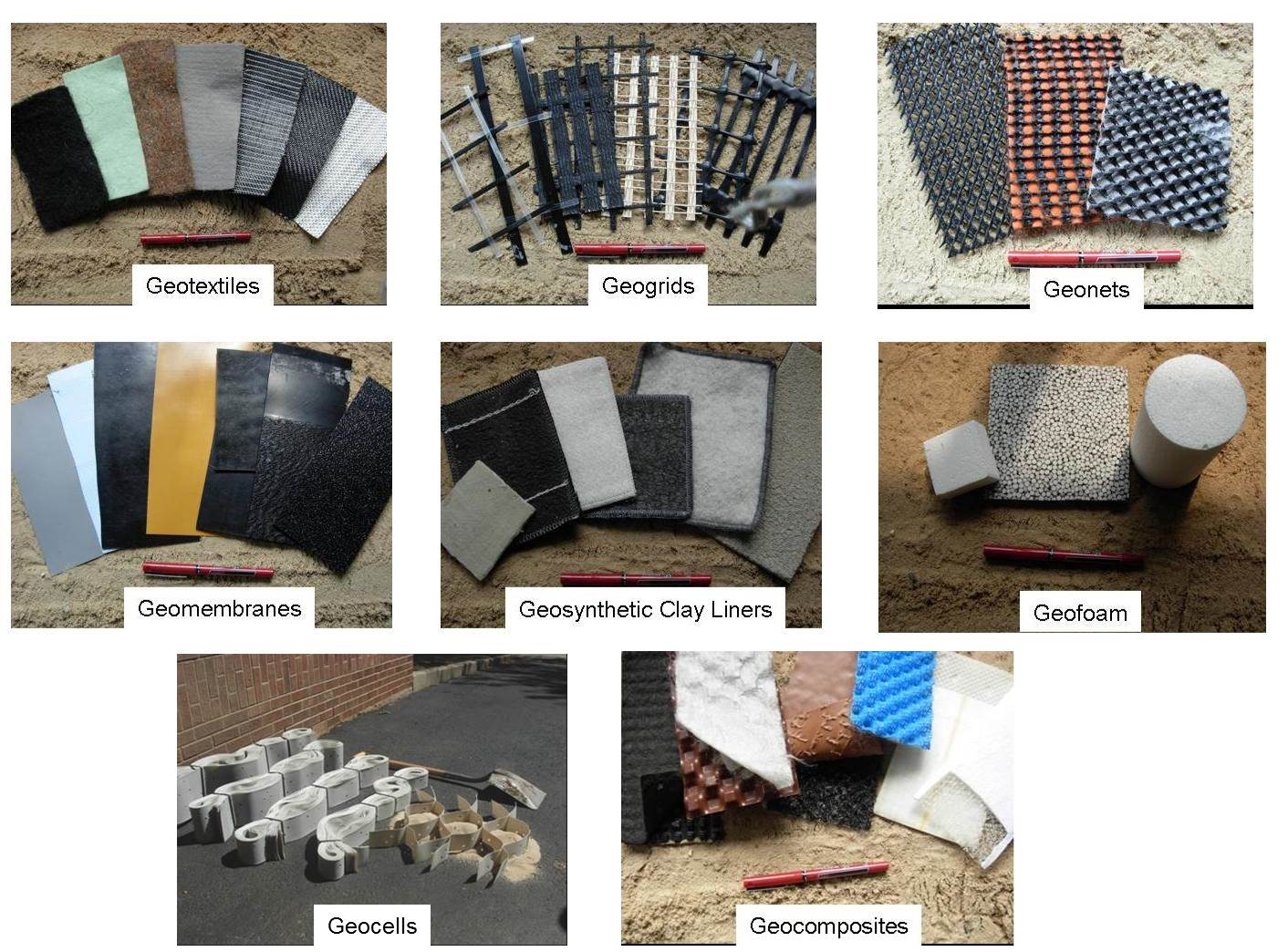
Geosynthetic products

== Categories ==
=== Geotextiles ===
Geotextiles form one of the two largest groups of geosynthetics. They are textiles consisting of synthetic fibers rather than natural ones such as cotton, wool, or silk. This makes them less susceptible to bio-degradation. These synthetic fibers are made into flexible, porous fabrics by standard weaving machinery or are matted together in a random non woven manner. Some are also knitted. Geotextiles are porous to liquid flow across their manufactured plane and also within their thickness, but to a widely varying degree. There are at least 100 specific application areas for geotextiles that have been developed; however, the fabric always performs at least one of four discrete functions: separation, reinforcement, filtration, and/or drainage.

=== Geogrids ===
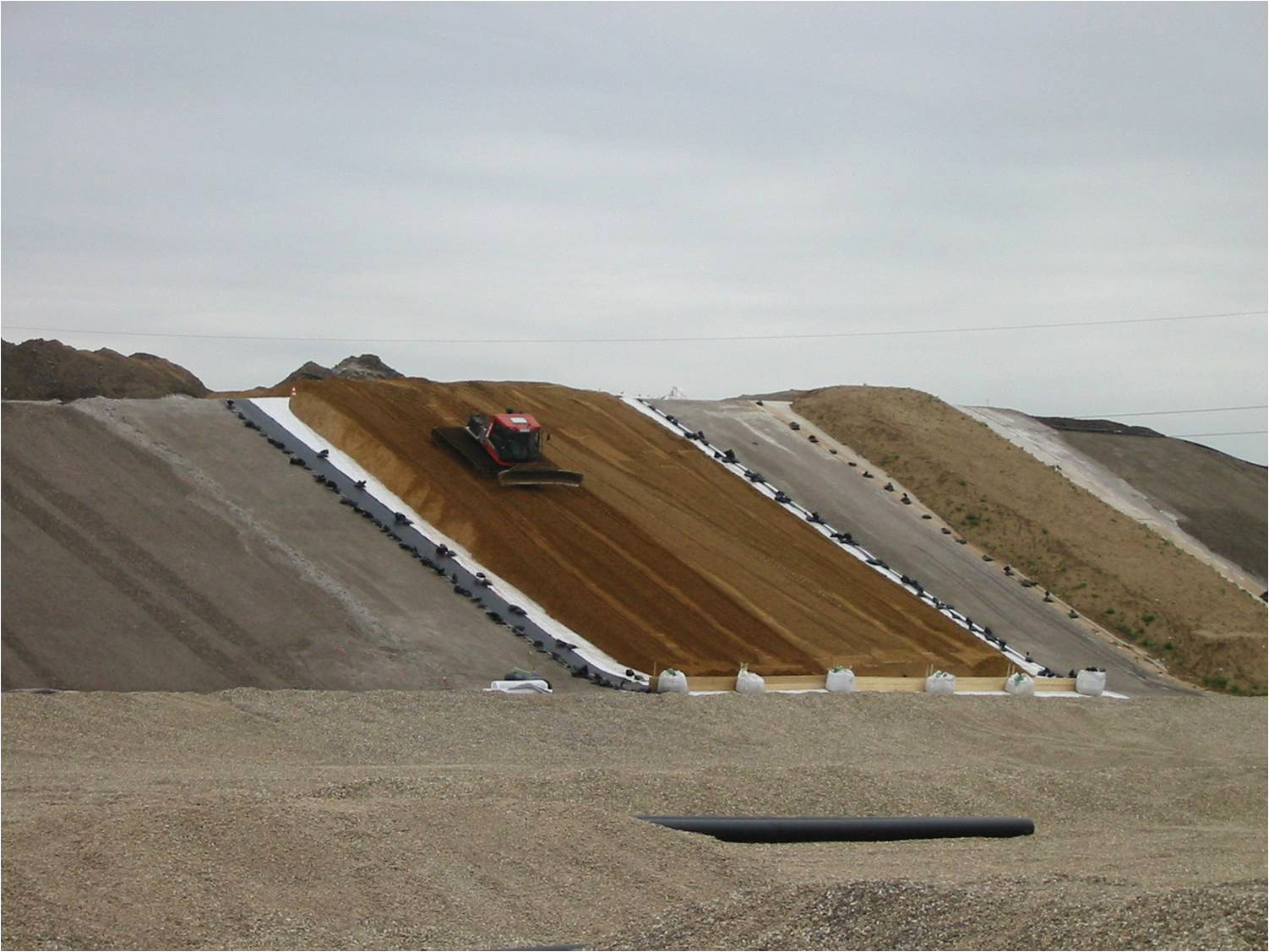
Geogrids are used to prevent sliding on long and steep slopes during installation and use of a landfill capping system.

Geogrids represent a rapidly growing segment within geosynthetics. Rather than being a woven, nonwoven or knitted textile fabric, geogrids are polymers formed into a very open, gridlike configuration, i.e., they have large apertures between individual ribs in the transverse and longitudinal directions. Geogrids are (a) either stretched in one, two or three directions for improved physical properties, (b) made on weaving or knitting machinery by standard textile manufacturing methods, or (c) by laser or ultrasonically bonding rods or straps together. There are many specific application areas; however, geogrids function almost exclusively as reinforcement materials.

=== Geonets/Geospacers ===
Geonets, and the related geospacers by some, constitute another specialized segment within the geosynthetics area. They are formed by a continuous extrusion of parallel sets of polymeric ribs at acute angles to one another. When the ribs are opened, relatively large apertures are formed into a netlike configuration. Two types are most common, either biplanar or triplanar. Alternatively many very different types of drainage cores are available. They consist of nubbed, dimpled or cuspated polymer sheets, three-dimensional networks of stiff polymer fibers in different configurations and perforated mini-pipes or spacers within geotextiles. Their design function is completely within the drainage area where they are used to convey liquids or gases of all types.

=== Geomembranes ===
Geomembranes represent the other largest group of geosynthetics, and in dollar volume their sales are greater than that of geotextiles. Their growth in the United States and Germany was stimulated by governmental regulations originally enacted in the early 1980s for the lining of solid-waste landfills. The materials themselves are relatively thin, impervious sheets of polymeric material used primarily for linings and covers of liquids- or solid-storage facilities. This includes all types of landfills, surface impoundments, canals, and other containment facilities. Thus the primary function is always containment as a liquid or vapor barrier or both. The range of applications, however, is great, and in addition to the environmental area, applications are rapidly growing in geotechnical, transportation, hydraulic, and private development engineering (such as aquaculture, agriculture, heap leach mining, etc.).

=== Geosynthetic clay liners ===
Geosynthetic clay liners, or GCLs, are an interesting juxtaposition of polymeric materials and natural soils. They are rolls of factory fabricated thin layers of bentonite clay sandwiched between two geotextiles or bonded to a geomembrane. Structural integrity of the subsequent composite is obtained by needle-punching, stitching or adhesive bonding. GCLs are used as a composite component beneath a geomembrane or by themselves in geoenvironmental and containment applications as well as in transportation, geotechnical, hydraulic, and many private development applications.

=== Geofoam ===
Geofoam is a polymeric product created by processing polystyrene into a foam consisting of many closed cells filled with air and/or gases. The skeletal nature of the cell walls resembles bone-structures made of the unexpanded polymeric material. The resulting product is generally in the form of large, but extremely light, blocks which are stacked side-by-side and in layers providing lightweight fill in numerous applications.

=== Geocells ===
Geocells (also known as Cellular Confinement Systems) are three-dimensional honeycombed cellular structures that form a confinement system when infilled with compacted soil. Extruded from polymeric materials into strips welded together ultrasonically in series, the strips are expanded to form the stiff (and typically textured and perforated) walls of a flexible 3D cellular mattress. Infilled with soil, a new composite entity is created from the cell-soil interactions. The cellular confinement reduces the lateral movement of soil particles, thereby maintaining compaction and forms a stiffened mattress that distributes loads over a wider area. Traditionally used in slope protection and earth retention applications, geocells made from advanced polymers are being increasingly adopted for long-term road and rail load support. Much larger geocells are also made from stiff geotextiles sewn into similar, but larger, unit cells that are used for protection bunkers and walls.

=== Geodrains ===
Geodrains are prefabricated product consisting of one or more polymeric core elements transporting fluid (perforated mini-pipes, geonets, cuspated sheets) and one or more geosynthetics separating the flow region from the surrounding environment.

=== Geocomposites ===
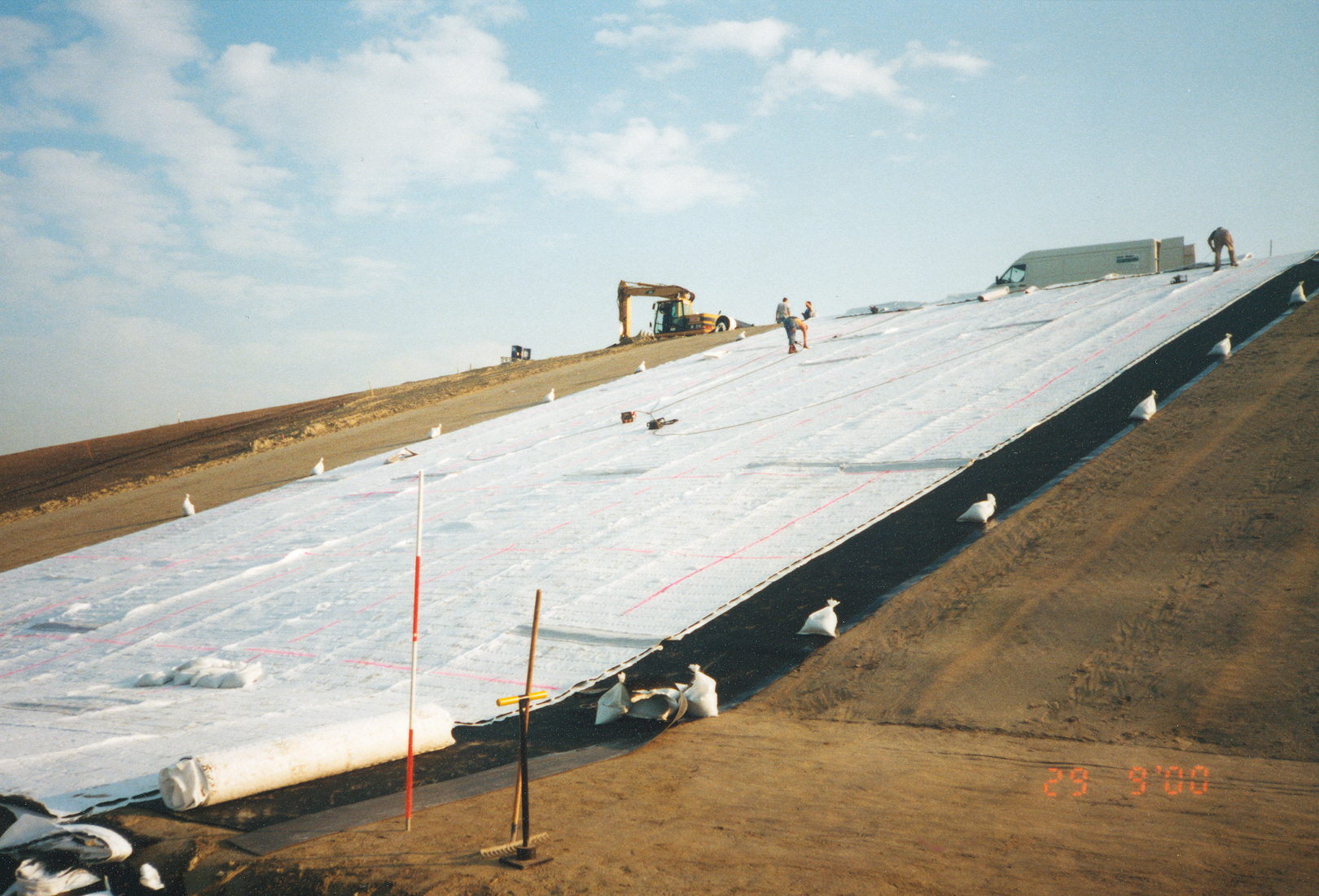
Installation of a geocomposite drain. Geocomposite drains are often used on steep slopes of landfill capping systems.

A geocomposite consists of a combination of geotextiles, geogrids, geonets and/or geomembranes in a factory fabricated unit. Also, any one of these four materials can be combined with another synthetic material (e.g., deformed plastic sheets or steel cables) or even with soil. As examples, a geonet or geospacer with geotextiles on both surfaces and a GCL consisting of a geotextile/bentonite/geotextile sandwich are both geocomposites. This specific category brings out the best creative efforts of the engineer and manufacturer. The application areas are numerous and constantly growing. The major functions encompass the entire range of functions listed for geosynthetics discussed previously: separation, reinforcement, filtration, drainage, and containment.

== Demand and production ==
Demand for geosynthetics (millions m^{2})
Region	2007	2012	2017
North America	923	965	1300
Western Europe	668	615	725
Asia/Pacific	723	1200	2330
Central and South America	124	160	220
Eastern Europe	248	305	405
Africa/Mideast	115	155	220
Total	2801	3400	5200

Worldwide sales of geosynthetics
Type	Amount (millions m^{2})	Price (USD/m^{2})	Sales (millions USD)
Geotextiles	1400	0.75	1050
Geogrids	250	2.50	625
Geonets	75	2.00	150
Geomembranes	300	6.00	1800
Geosynthetic clay liners	100	6.50	650
Geofoams	5	75.00	375
Geocomposites	100	4.00	400
Total	2230		5050

== Functions ==
Environmental stabilization by the United States Army Corps of Engineers working in Puerto Rico after Hurricane Maria

The juxtaposition of the various types of geosynthetics just described with the primary function that the material is called upon to serve allows for the creation of an organizational matrix for geosynthetics; see table below. In essence, this matrix is the "scorecard" for understanding the entire geosynthetic field and its design related methodology. In the table the primary function that each geosynthetic can be called upon to serve is seen. Note that these are primary functions and in many cases (if not most) cases there are secondary functions, and perhaps tertiary ones as well. For example, a geotextile placed on soft soil will usually be designed on the basis of its reinforcement capability, but separation and filtration might certainly be secondary and tertiary considerations. As another example, a geomembrane is obviously used for its containment capability, but separation will always be a secondary function. The greatest variability from a manufacturing and materials viewpoint is the category of geocomposites. The primary function will depend entirely upon what is actually created, manufactured, and installed.

Primary functions of geosynthetics
Type of geosynthetics (GS)	Separation	Reinforcement	Filtration	Drainage	Containment
2.1 Geotextile (GT)	X	X	X	X	
2.2 Geogrid (GG)		X			
2.3 Geonet (GN) or geospacer (GR)				X	
2.4 Geomembrane (GM)					X
2.5 Geosynthetic clay liner (GCL)					X
2.6 Geofoam (GF)	X				
2.7 Geocells (GL)	X	X			
2.8 Geocomposite (GC)	X	X	X	X	X

Geosynthetics are generally designed for a particular application by considering the primary function that can be provided. As seen in the accompanying table there are five primary functions given, but some groups suggest even more.

Separation is the placement of a flexible geosynthetic material, like a porous geotextile, between dissimilar materials so that the integrity and functioning of both materials can remain intact or even be improved. Paved roads, unpaved roads, and railroad bases are common applications. Also, the use of thick nonwoven geotextiles for cushioning and protection of geomembranes is in this category. In addition, for most applications of geofoam and geocells, separation is the major function.

Reinforcement is the synergistic improvement of a total system's strength created by the introduction of a geotextile, geogrid or geocell (all of which are good in tension) into a soil (that is good in compression, but poor in tension) or other disjointed and separated material. Applications of this function are in mechanically stabilized and retained earth walls and steep soil slopes; they can be combined with masonry facings to create vertical retaining walls. Also involved is the application of basal reinforcement over soft soils and over deep foundations for embankments and heavy surface loadings. Stiff polymer geogrids and geocells do not have to be held in tension to provide soil reinforcement, unlike geotextiles. Stiff 2D geogrid and 3D geocells interlock with the aggregate particles and the reinforcement mechanism is one of confinement of the aggregate. The resulting mechanically stabilized aggregate layer exhibits improved loadbearing performance. Stiff polymer geogrids, with very open apertures, in addition to three-dimensional geocells made from various polymers are also increasingly specified in unpaved and paved roadways, load platforms and railway ballast, where the improved loadbearing characteristics significantly reduce the requirements for high quality, imported aggregate fills, thus reducing the carbon footprint of the construction.

Filtration is the equilibrium soil-to-geotextile interaction that allows for adequate liquid flow without soil loss, across the plane of the geotextile over a service lifetime compatible with the application under consideration. Filtration applications are highway underdrain systems, retaining wall drainage, landfill leachate collection systems, as silt fences and curtains, and as flexible forms for bags, tubes and containers.

Drainage is the equilibrium soil-to-geosynthetic system that allows for adequate liquid flow without soil loss, within the plane of the geosynthetic over a service lifetime compatible with the application under consideration. Geopipe highlights this function, and also geonets, geocomposites and very thick geotextiles. Drainage applications for these different geosynthetics are retaining walls, sport fields, dams, canals, reservoirs, and capillary breaks. Also to be noted is that sheet, edge and wick drains are geocomposites used for various soil and rock drainage situations.

Containment involves geomembranes, geosynthetic clay liners, or some geocomposites which function as liquid or gas barriers. Landfill liners and covers make critical use of these geosynthetics. All hydraulic applications (tunnels, dams, canals, surface impoundments, and floating covers) use these geosynthetics as well.

== Advantages ==
- The manufactured quality control of geosynthetics in a controlled factory environment is a great advantage over outdoor soil and rock construction. Most factories are ISO 9000 certified and have their own in-house quality programs as well.
- The low thickness of geosynthetics, as compared to their natural soil counterparts, is an advantage insofar as light weight on the subgrade, less airspace used, and avoidance of quarried sand, gravel, and clay soil materials.
- The ease of geosynthetic installation is significant in comparison to thick soil layers (sands, gravels, or clays) requiring large earthmoving equipment.
- Published standards (test methods, guides, and specifications) are well advanced in standards-setting organizations like ISO, ASTM, and GSI.
- Design methods are currently available from many publication sources as well as universities which teach stand-alone courses in geosynthetics or have integrated geosynthetics in traditional geotechnical, geoenvironmental, and hydraulic engineering courses.
- When comparing geosynthetic designs to alternative natural soil designs there are usually cost advantages and invariably sustainability (lower CO_{2} footprint) advantages.

== Disadvantages ==
- Long-term performance of the particular formulated resin being used to make the geosynthetic must be assured by using proper additives including antioxidants, ultraviolet screeners, and fillers.
- The exposed lifetime of geosynthetics, being polymeric, is less than unexposed as when they are soil backfilled.
- Clogging or bioclogging of geotextiles, geonets, geopipe and/or geocomposites is a challenging design for certain soil types or unusual situations. For example, loess soils, fine cohesionless silts, highly turbid liquids, and microorganism laden liquids (farm runoff) are troublesome and generally require specialized testing evaluations.
- Handling, storage, carrying and installation must be assured by careful quality control and quality assurance.
