= Geotextile =

Textile material used in ground stabilization and construction

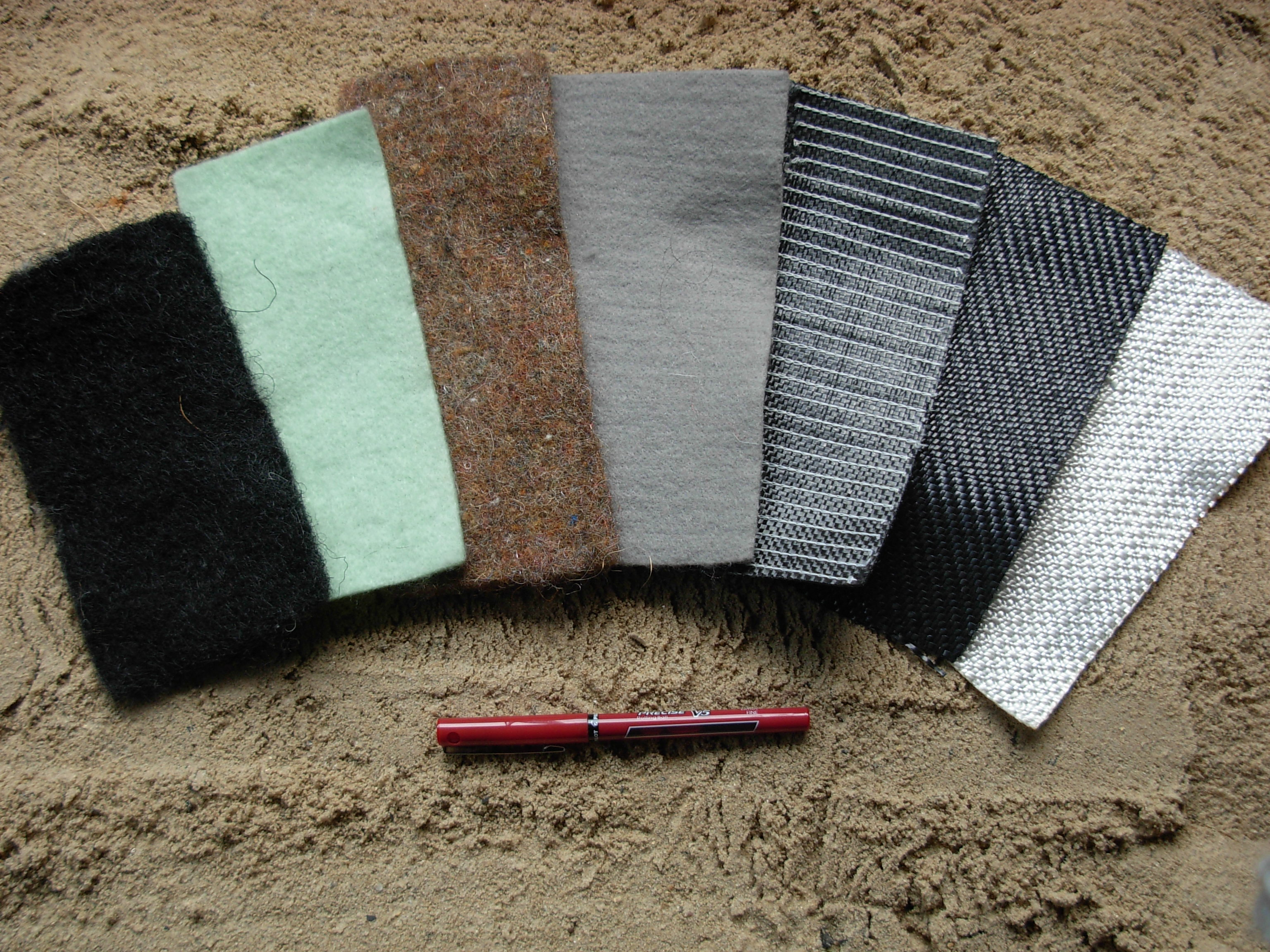
A selection of woven and non-woven geotextile samples

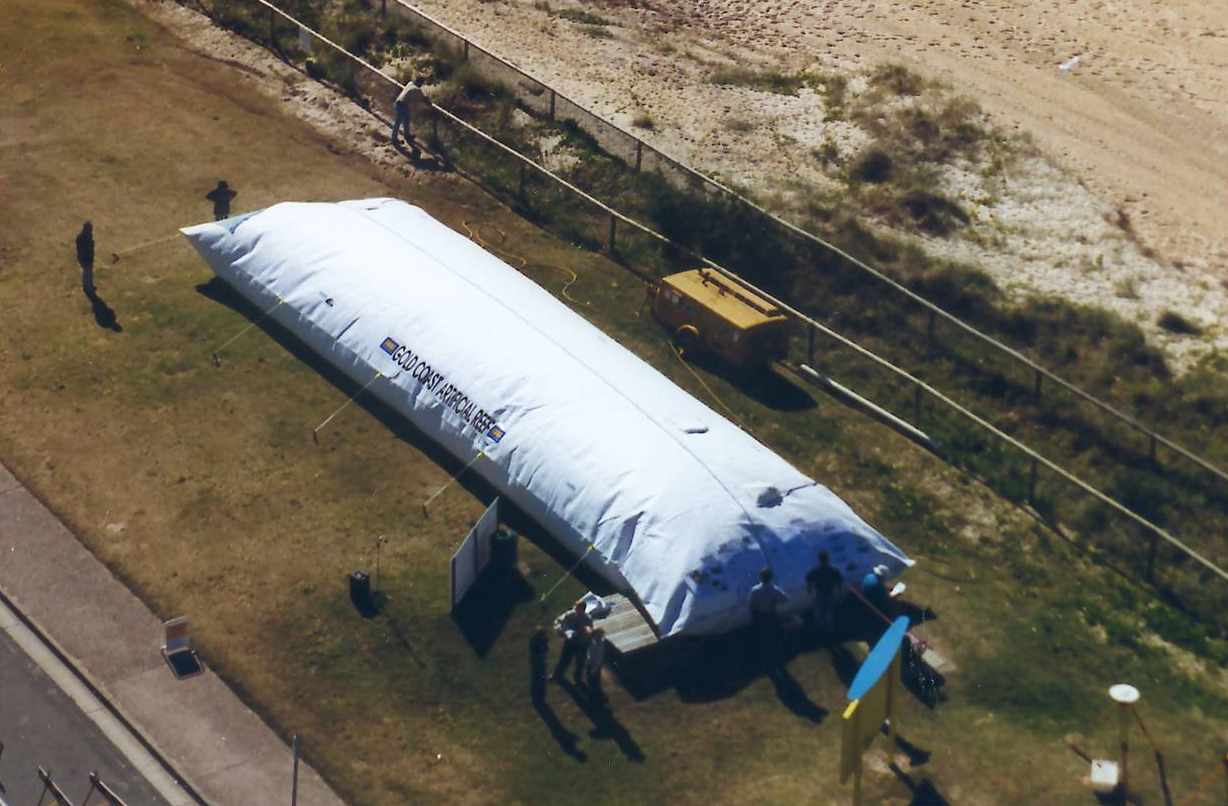
Geotextile sandbags can be 20 m long, such as those used for the artificial reef at Narrow Neck, Queensland.

Geotextiles are versatile permeable fabrics that, when used in conjunction with soil, can effectively perform multiple functions, including separation, filtration, reinforcement, protection, and drainage. Typically crafted from polypropylene or polyester, geotextile fabrics are available in two primary forms: woven, which resembles traditional mail bag sacking, and nonwoven, which resembles felt.

Geotextile composites have been introduced and products such as geogrids and meshes have been developed. Geotextiles are durable and are able to soften a fall. Overall, these materials are referred to as geosynthetics and each configuration—geonets, geosynthetic clay liners, geogrids, geotextile tubes, and others—can yield benefits in geotechnical and environmental engineering design.

== History ==
Geotextiles were originally intended to be a substitute for granular soil filters. Geotextiles can also be referred to as filter fabrics. In the 1950s, R.J. Barrett began working using geotextiles behind precast concrete seawalls, under precast concrete erosion control blocks, beneath large stone riprap, and in other erosion control situations. He used different styles of woven monofilament fabrics, all characterized by a relatively high percentage open area (varying from 6 to 30%). He discussed the need for both adequate permeability and soil retention, along with adequate fabric strength and proper elongation and tone setting for geotextile use in filtration situations.

== Applications ==
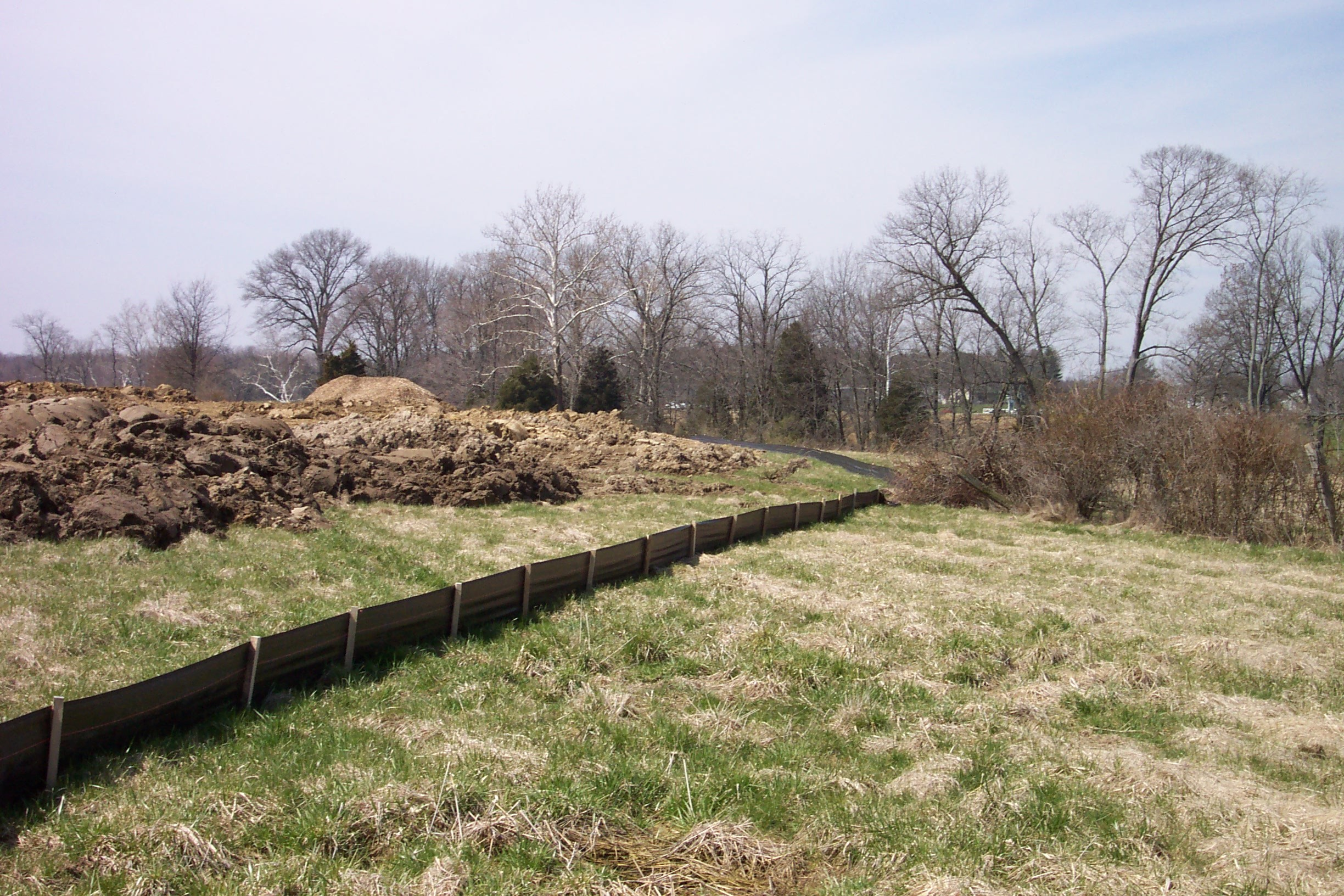
A silt fence on a construction site.

Geotextiles and related products have many applications and currently support many civil engineering applications including roads, airfields, railroads, embankments, retaining structures, reservoirs, canals, dams, bank protection, coastal engineering and construction site silt fences or to form a geotextile tube. Geotextiles can also serve as components of other geosynthetics such as the reinforcing material in a bituminous geomembrane or a geosynthetic clay liner. Usually geotextiles are placed at the tension surface to strengthen the soil. Geotextiles are also used for sand dune armoring to protect upland coastal property from storm surge, wave action and flooding. A large sand-filled container (SFC) within the dune system prevents storm erosion from proceeding beyond the SFC. Using a sloped unit rather than a single tube eliminates damaging scour.

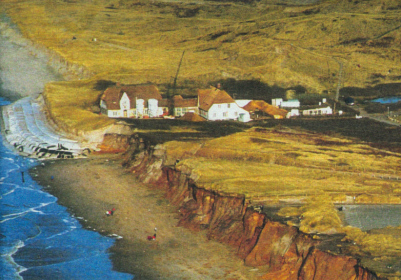
Geotextile sandbags protected the historic house Kliffende on Sylt island against storms, which eroded the cliffs left and right from the sandbag barrier.

Erosion control manuals comment on the effectiveness of sloped, stepped shapes in mitigating shoreline erosion damage from storms. Geotextile sand-filled units provide a "soft" armoring solution for upland property protection. Geotextiles are used as matting to stabilize flow in stream channels and swales.

Geotextiles can improve soil strength at a lower cost than conventional soil nailing. In addition, geotextiles allow planting on steep slopes, further securing the slope.

Geotextiles have been used to protect the fossil hominid footprints of Laetoli in Tanzania from erosion, rain, and tree roots.

In building demolition, geotextile fabrics in combination with steel wire fencing can contain explosive debris.

Coir (coconut fiber) geotextiles are popular for erosion control, slope stabilization and bioengineering, due to the fabric's substantial mechanical strength. Coir geotextiles last approximately 3 to 5 years depending on the fabric weight. The product degrades into humus, enriching the soil.

=== Global warming ===
==== Glacial retreat ====
Geotextiles with reflective properties are often used in protecting the melting glaciers. In north Italy, they use Geotextiles to cover the glaciers for protection from the Sun. The reflective properties of the geotextile reflect the sun away from the melting glacier in order to slow the process.

== Design methods ==
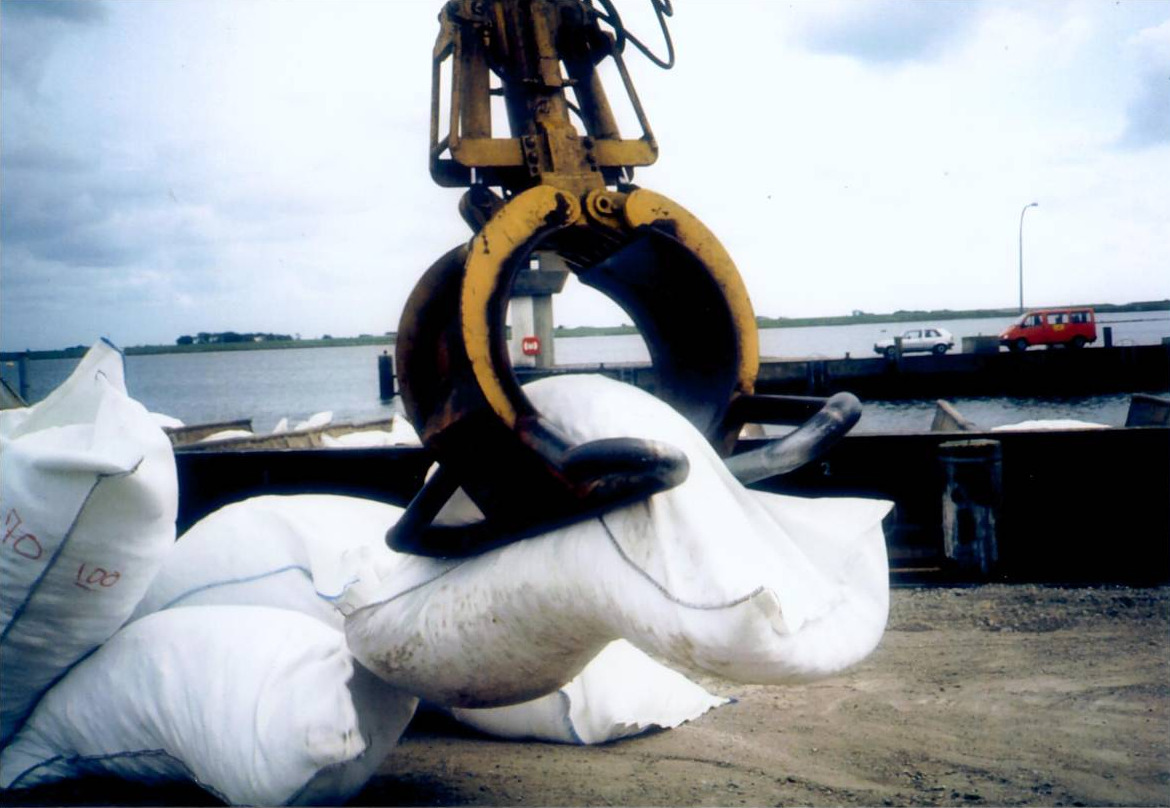
Nonwoven geotextile bags are much more robust than woven bags of the same thickness.

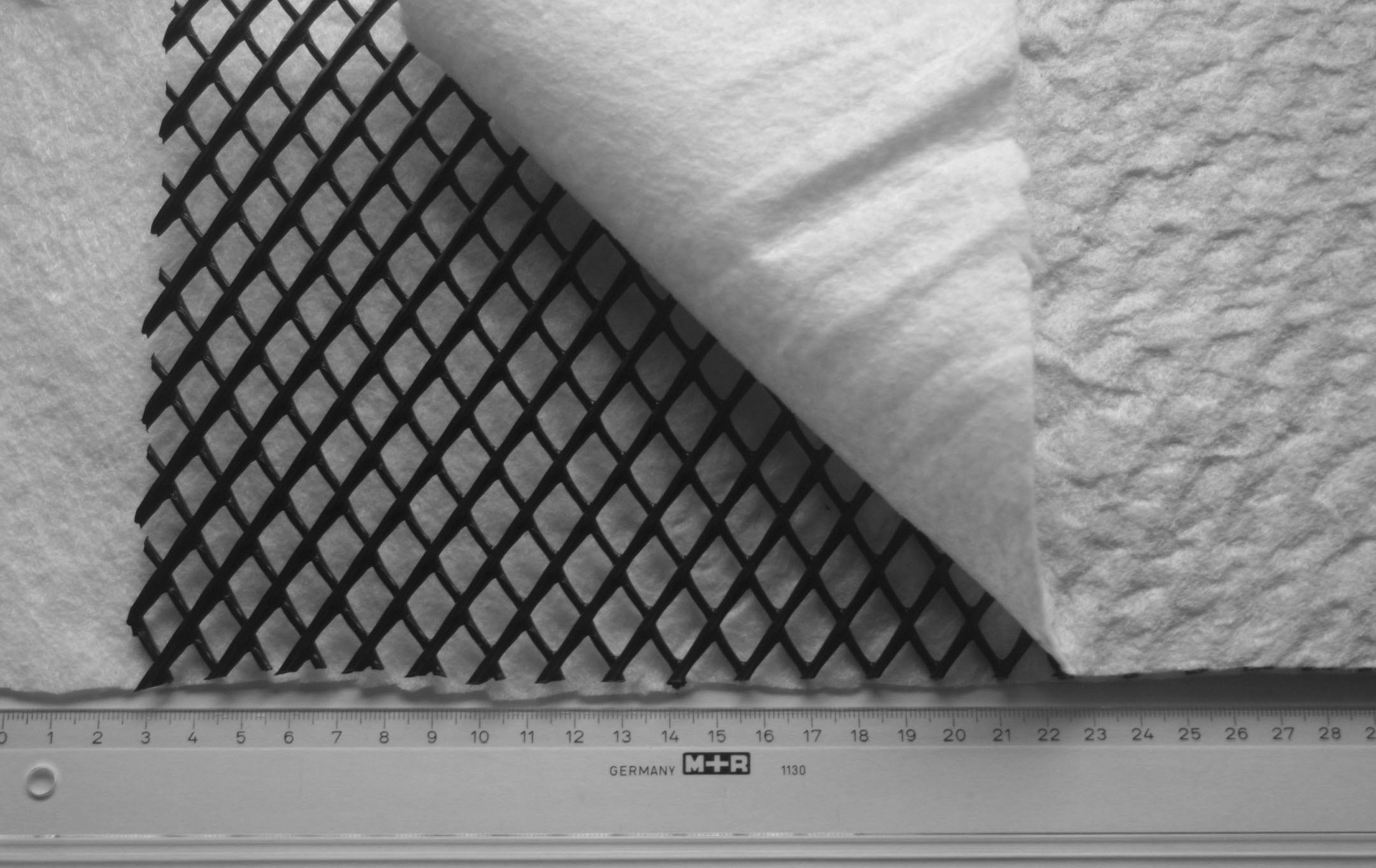
Geocomposite drain consisting of needle-punched nonwoven filter and carrier geotextiles of polypropylene staple fibers each having a mass per area of 200 g/m^{2}.

While many possible design methods or combinations of methods are available to the geotextile designer, the ultimate decision for a particular application usually takes one of three directions: design by cost and availability, design by specification, or design by function. Extensive literature on design methods for geotextiles has been published in the peer reviewed journal Geotextiles and Geomembranes.

== Requirements ==
Geotextiles are needed for specific requirements, just as anything else in the world. Some of these requirements consist of polymers composed of a minimum of 85% by weight poly-propylene, polyesters, polyamides, polyolefins, and polyethylene.

== See also ==
- Geomembrane
- Geotextile tube
- Hard landscape materials
- Polypropylene raffia
- Sediment control
