= Leachate =

Liquid that extracts soluble or suspended solids

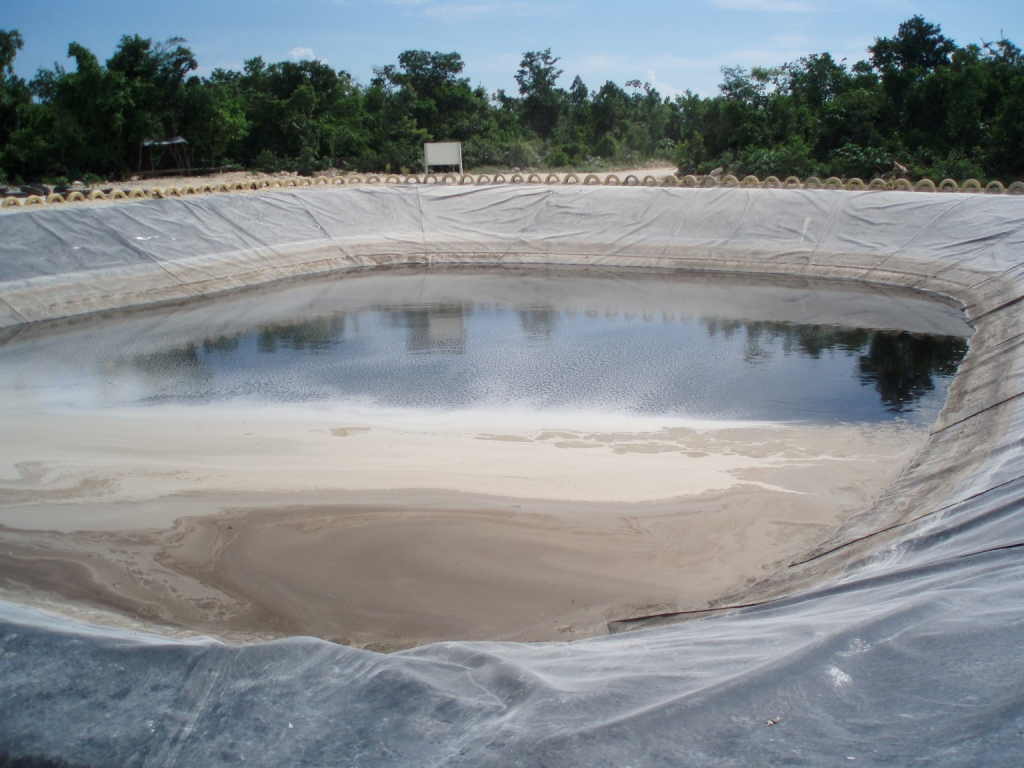
A leachate evaporation pond in a landfill site located in Cancún, Mexico

A leachate is any liquid that passes through matter and extracts soluble or suspended solids, or any other component of the material it passed through.

Leachate is a widely used term in the environmental sciences where it has the specific meaning of a liquid that contains environmentally-harmful substances that can enter the environment. It is commonly used in the context of land-filling of decomposable or industrial waste.

In the narrow environmental context, leachate is any liquid that drains from land or stockpiled material and contains significantly-elevated concentrations of undesirable material from what it passed through.

== Landfill leachate ==
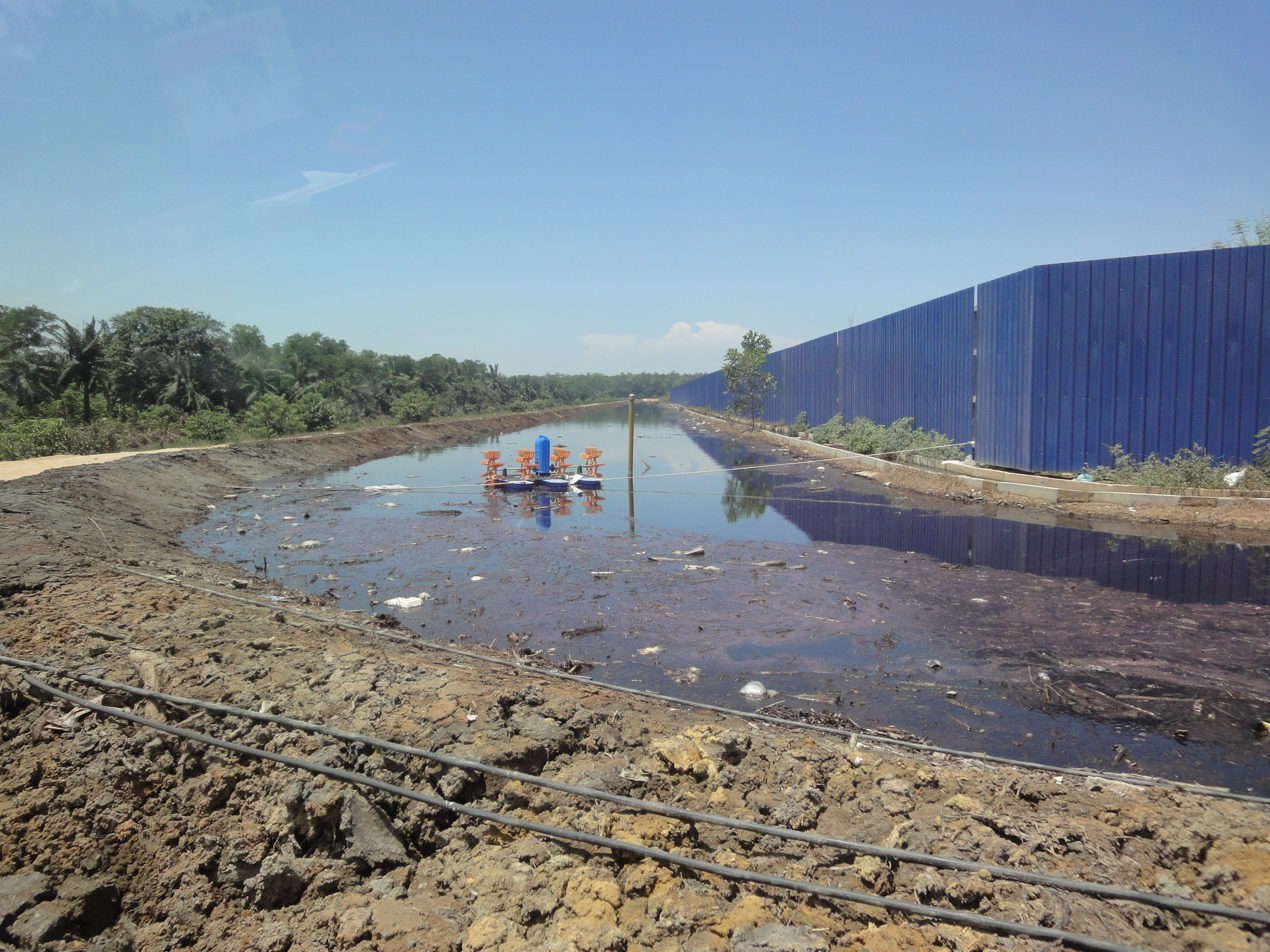
Part of a leachate containment system in a landfill in Penang, Malaysia

Landfill leachate is contaminated liquid formed when rain or another source of water enters a landfill and comes in contact with waste, which may then flow into and contaminate local groundwater if not properly managed. Landfill leachate varies widely in composition depending on the age of the landfill and the type of waste that it contains. It usually contains both dissolved and suspended material. The generation of leachate is caused principally by precipitation percolating through waste deposited in a landfill. Once in contact with decomposing solid waste, the percolating water becomes contaminated, and if it then flows out of the waste material it is termed leachate. Additional leachate volume is produced during this decomposition of carbonaceous material producing a wide range of other materials including methane, carbon dioxide and a complex mixture of organic acids, aldehydes, alcohols and simple sugars.

The risks of leachate generation can be mitigated by properly designed and engineered landfill sites, such as those that are constructed on geologically impermeable materials or sites that use impermeable liners made of geomembranes or engineered clay. The use of linings is now mandatory within the United States, Australia and the European Union except where the waste is deemed inert. In addition, most toxic and difficult materials are now specifically excluded from landfilling. However, despite much stricter statutory controls, leachates from modern sites are often found to contain a range of contaminants stemming from illegal activity or legally discarded household and domestic products.

In a 2012 survey performed in New York State, all surveyed double-lined landfill cells had leakage rates of less than 500 liters per hectare per day. Average leakage rates were much lower than for landfills built according to older standards before 1992.

== Use in mining ==
=== Heap leaching ===
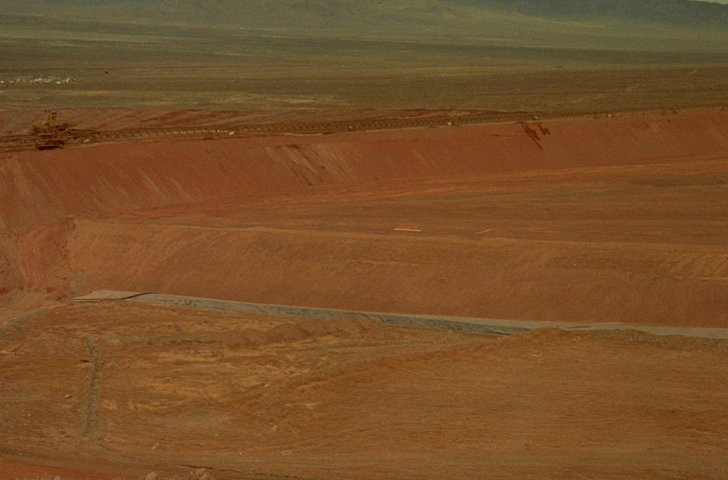
Gold heap leaching

Heap leaching is an industrial mining process used to extract precious metals, copper, uranium, and other compounds from ore using a series of chemical reactions that absorb specific minerals and re-separate them after their division from other earth materials. While similar to in situ mining, heap leach mining differs in that it places ore on a liner, then adds the chemicals via drip systems to the ore, whereas in situ mining lacks these liners and pulls pregnant solution up to obtain the minerals. Heap leaching is widely used in modern large-scale mining operations as it produces the desired concentrates at a lower cost compared to conventional processing methods such as flotation, agitation, and vat leaching.

Additionally, dump leaching is an essential part of most copper mining operations and determines the quality grade of the produced material along with other factors

Due to the profitability that the dump leaching has on the mining process, i.e. it can contribute substantially to the economic viability of the mining process, it is advantageous to include the results of the leaching operation in the economic overall project evaluation.

The process has ancient origins; one of the classical methods for the manufacture of copperas (iron sulfate) was to heap up iron pyrite and collect the leachate from the heap, which was then boiled with iron to produce iron(II) sulfate.

=== In situ leach ===
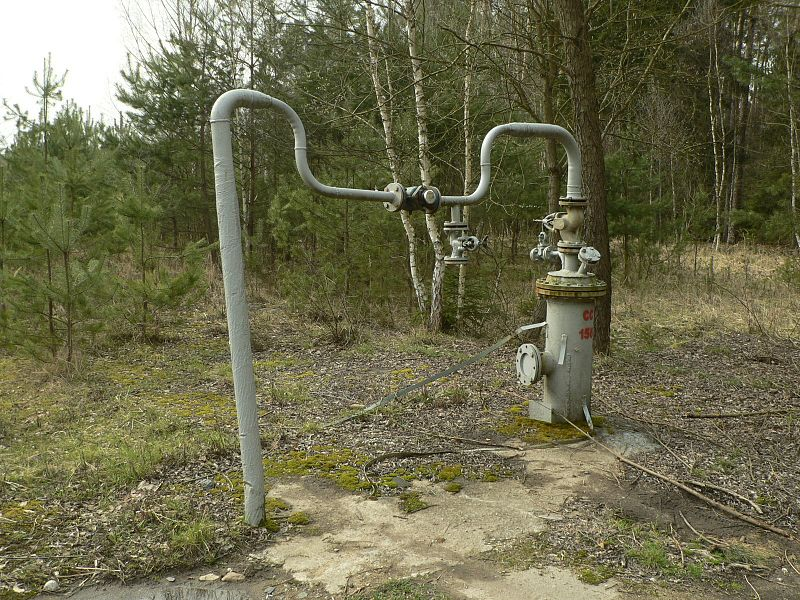
Remains of an abandoned piping system used for uranium in-situ leaching in Stráž pod Ralskem, Czech Republic

In-situ leaching (ISL), also called in-situ recovery (ISR) or solution mining, is a mining process used to recover minerals such as copper and uranium through boreholes drilled into a deposit, in situ. In-situ leach works by artificially dissolving minerals occurring naturally in the solid state.

The process initially involves the drilling of boreholes into the ore deposit. Explosive or hydraulic fracturing can be used to create open pathways in the deposit for the solution to penetrate. Leaching solution is pumped into the deposit where it comes in contact with the ore. The solution bearing the dissolved ore content is then pumped to the surface and processed. This process allows the extraction of metals and salts from an ore body without the need for conventional mining involving drill-and-blast, open-cut or underground mining.

== Other types ==
Leachate can also be produced from land that was contaminated by chemicals or toxic materials used in industrial activities such as factories, mines or storage sites.

Composting sites in areas and/or times of high rainfall also produce leachate. Due to the makeup of compost, which often consists of materials that degrade relatively easily compared to the makeup other waste collection sites, prolonged moisture exposure and occurrence of anaerobic digestion, which can occur due to the collapse of compost piles. The critical portion then involves exposure to precipitation, which causes the decomposed matter to flow, becoming runoff and therefore leachate.

Leachate is associated with stockpiled coal and with waste materials from metal ore mining and other rock extraction processes, especially those in which sulfide containing materials are exposed to air producing sulfuric acid, often with elevated metal concentrations.

In the context of civil engineering (more specifically reinforced concrete design), leachate refers to the effluent of pavement wash-off (that may include melting snow and ice with salt) that permeates through the cement paste onto the surface of the steel reinforcement, thereby catalyzing its oxidation and degradation. Leachates can be genotoxic in nature.

A possible risk for the aquatic environment due to the occurrence of organic micropollutants in raw or treated landfill leachates has also been reported in recent studies.
