= Paradox Access Solutions =

Canadian construction company

- Company type: Privately held company
- Industry: Construction
- Founded: 2004
- Headquarters: Acheson, Alberta
- Key people: Marc Breault, Founder and CEO
- Services: Access solutions (mats, cellular confinement, geotextile), Earthworks (engineering))

Paradox Access Solutions is a construction company specializing in customized access solutions for companies who need temporary or permanent roadways built on unstable terrain, such as muskeg, permafrost or mud. The company is located in Acheson, Alberta with distribution access across Alberta and Saskatchewan.

== History ==
Paradox Access Solutions was founded in 2004 by Marc Breault, who holds six patents relating to roadway construction. In 2012, the company formed an engineering firm to provide geotechnical engineering expertise.

In the aftermath of the 2016 Fort McMurray wildfire, the company assisted with road restoration in affected communities, creating 40 km of temporary roads in a little over one week. Paradox also donated used mats (see description in Products and Services below) to regional nature trail construction groups to aid in trail stabilization and sustainability.

In 2018, the company began work to restore the Hudson Bay Railway to Churchill, Manitoba, which was washed out by floods in May 2017. Paradox provided railbed restoration while Cando Rail repaired the rails.

== Products and Services ==
The company is a provider of wood, rubber and composite mats (often called rig mats or swamp mats), intended to provide stable, if temporary, roadways for industrial applications, such as in oil and natural gas, pipeline access, mining, and utility corridors. The mats are placed in the spring when the ground thaws and removed later in the year when the ground re-freezes, providing extended access to industrial sites in locations where traditional access construction methods are ill-suited, due to location, cost or sensitive environmental conditions. These mats may also be used in aviation, rail transport and paved or unpaved public or private road surface applications.

=== Tough Cell ===
Paradox Access Solutions is the sole Canadian distributor of a product called Tough Cell, a Novel polymeric alloy cellular confinement product known as Neology geocell.

Once the honeycomb-shaped geotextile is placed, it's filled with sand, gravel, dirt, or other locally available materials, and then compressed. The honeycomb shape is able to support heavy equipment by redirecting downward energy outward, “decreasing differential settlement of soft subgrades,” providing soil confinement, stabilization, and reinforcement. The resulting surface is functional in very cold (-60 °C) to very hot (60 °C) conditions.

The product is notable for its use of local, rather than imported, aggregate materials.

In addition to temporary roadway applications, it has also been approved for municipal road construction projects.
