= Railway track =

Rail infrastructure

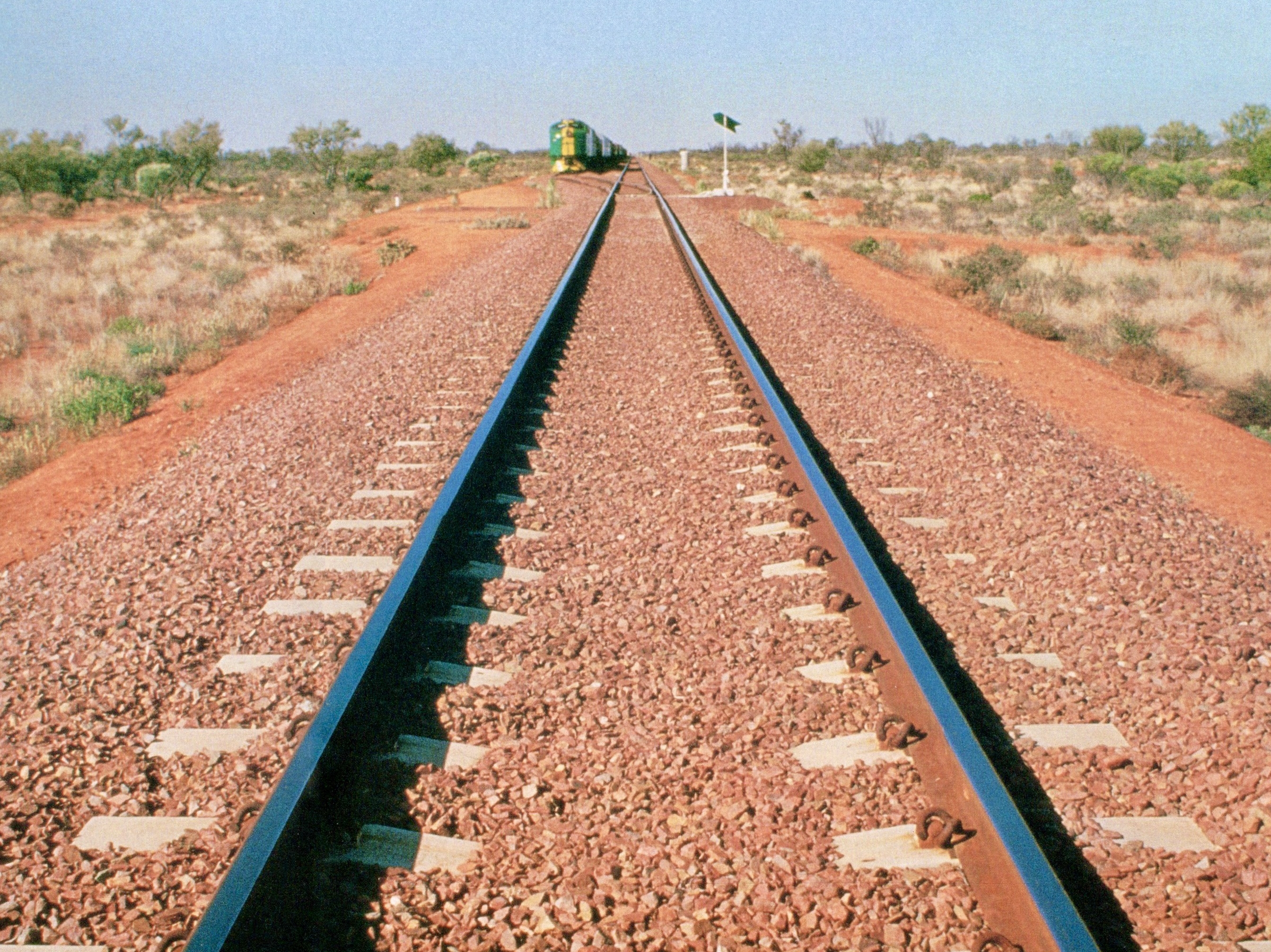
Common contemporary practice in track construction, featuring well-drained ballast spread level with the tops of concrete sleepers/crossties – Australian National Railways, ca 1982

Railway track (CwthE and UIC terminology) or railroad track (NAmE), also known as permanent way (per way) (CwthE) or "P way" (BrE and Indian English), is the structure on a railway consisting of the rails, fasteners, sleepers (railroad ties in American English) and ballast (or slab track), plus the underlying subgrade. It enables trains to move by providing a dependable, low-friction surface on which steel wheels can roll. Early tracks were constructed with wooden or cast-iron rails and wooden or stone sleepers. Since the 1870s, rails have almost universally been made from steel.

== Historical development ==
The first railway in Britain was the Wollaton Wagonway, built in 1603 between Wollaton and Strelley in Nottinghamshire. It used wooden rails and was the first of about 50 wooden-railed tramways built over the subsequent 164 years. These early wooden tramways typically used rails of oak or beech, attached to wooden sleepers with iron or wooden nails. Gravel or small stones were packed around the sleepers to hold them in place and provide a walkway for the people or horses that moved wagons along the track. The rails were usually about 3 feet (0.91 m) long and were not joined - instead, adjacent rails were laid on a common sleeper. The straight rails could be angled at these joints to form a primitive curved track.

The first iron rails laid in Britain were at the Darby Ironworks in Coalbrookdale in 1767.

When steam locomotives were introduced, starting in 1804, the track then in use proved too weak to carry the additional weight. Richard Trevithick's pioneering locomotive at Pen-y-darren broke the plateway track and had to be withdrawn. As locomotives became more widespread in the 1810s and 1820s, engineers built rigid track formations, with iron rails mounted on stone sleepers, and cast-iron chairs holding them in place. This proved to be a mistake, and was soon replaced with flexible track structures that allowed a degree of elastic movement as trains passed over them.

== Structure ==
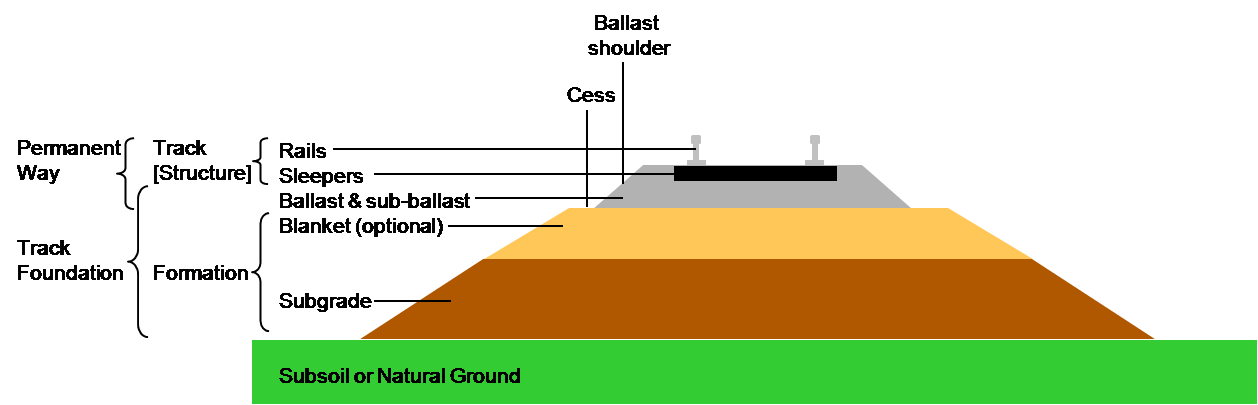
Section through railway track and foundation showing the ballast and formation layers. The layers are slightly sloped to help drainage. Sometimes there is a layer of rubber matting (not shown) to improve drainage, and to dampen sound and vibration

=== Traditional track structure ===
Traditionally, tracks are constructed using flat-bottomed steel rails laid on and spiked or screwed into timber or pre-stressed concrete sleepers (known as ties in North America), with crushed stone ballast placed beneath and around the sleepers.

Most modern railroads with heavy traffic use continuously welded rails that are attached to the sleepers with base plates that spread the load. When concrete sleepers are used, a plastic or rubber pad is usually placed between the rail and the tie plate. Rail is usually attached to the sleeper with resilient fastenings, although cut spikes are widely used in North America. For much of the 20th century, rail tracks used softwood timber sleepers and jointed rails, and a considerable amount of this track remains on secondary and tertiary routes.

In North America and Australia, flat-bottomed rails were typically fastened to the sleepers with dog spikes through a flat tie plate. In Britain and Ireland, bullhead rails were carried in cast-iron chairs which were spiked to the sleepers. In 1936, the London, Midland and Scottish Railway pioneered the conversion to flat-bottomed rail in Britain, though earlier lines had used it to some extent.

Jointed rails were used at first because contemporary technology did not offer any alternative. However, the ballast's intrinsic weakness in resisting vertical loading causes it to become depressed, and a heavy maintenance workload is required to prevent unacceptable geometric defects at the joints. The joints also needed to be lubricated, and wear at the fishplate (joint bar) mating surfaces needed to be rectified by shimming. For this reason, jointed track is not financially appropriate for heavily operated railroads.

Timber sleepers are made of many available timbers, and are often treated with creosote, chromated copper arsenate, or other wood preservatives. Pre-stressed concrete sleepers are often used where timber is scarce and where tonnage or speeds are high. Steel is used in some applications.

Track ballast is usually stone crushed to particular specifications. Its purpose is to support the sleepers and allow some adjustment of their position while allowing free drainage.

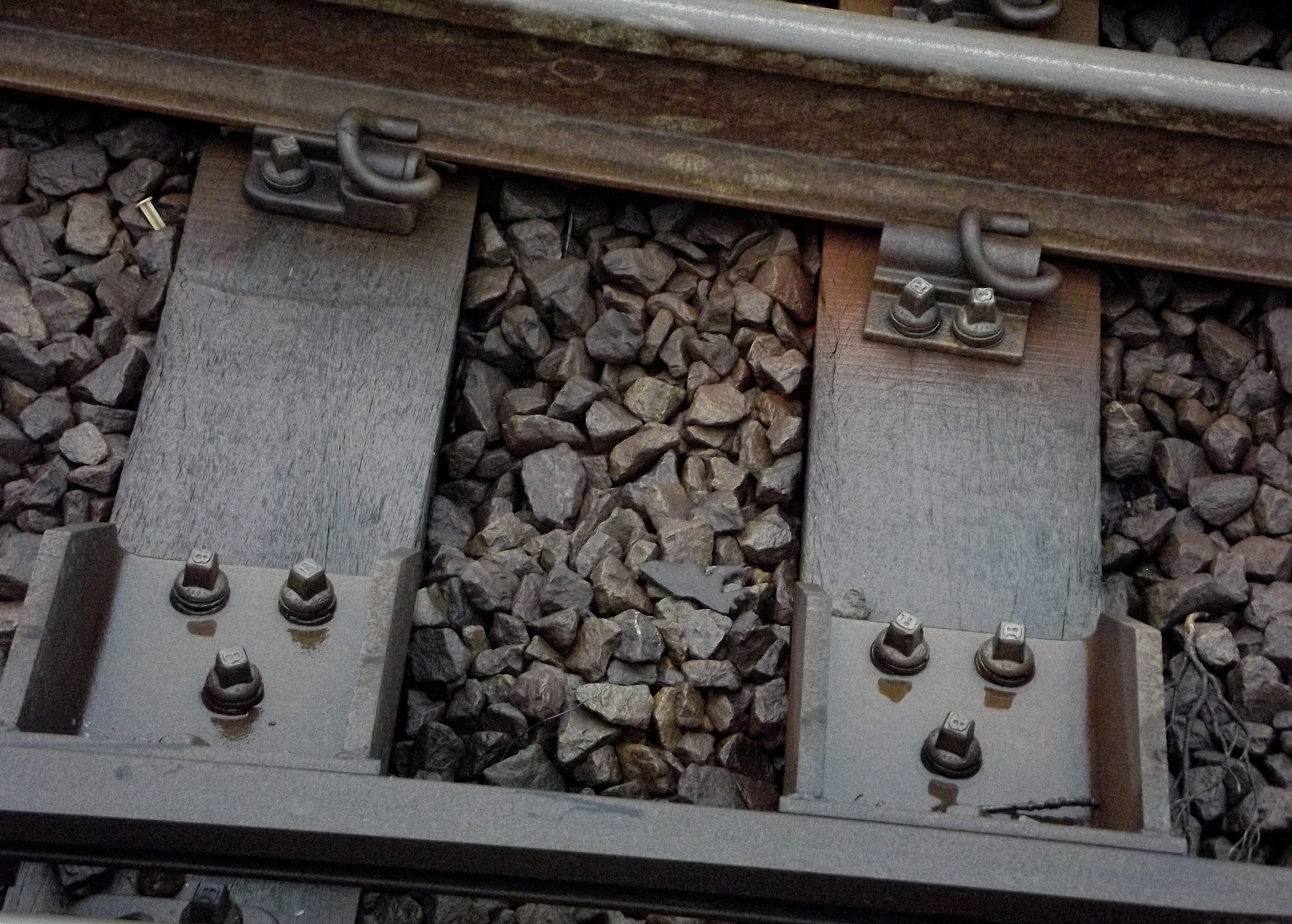
Traditional railway track showing ballast, sleepers, and rail fixings

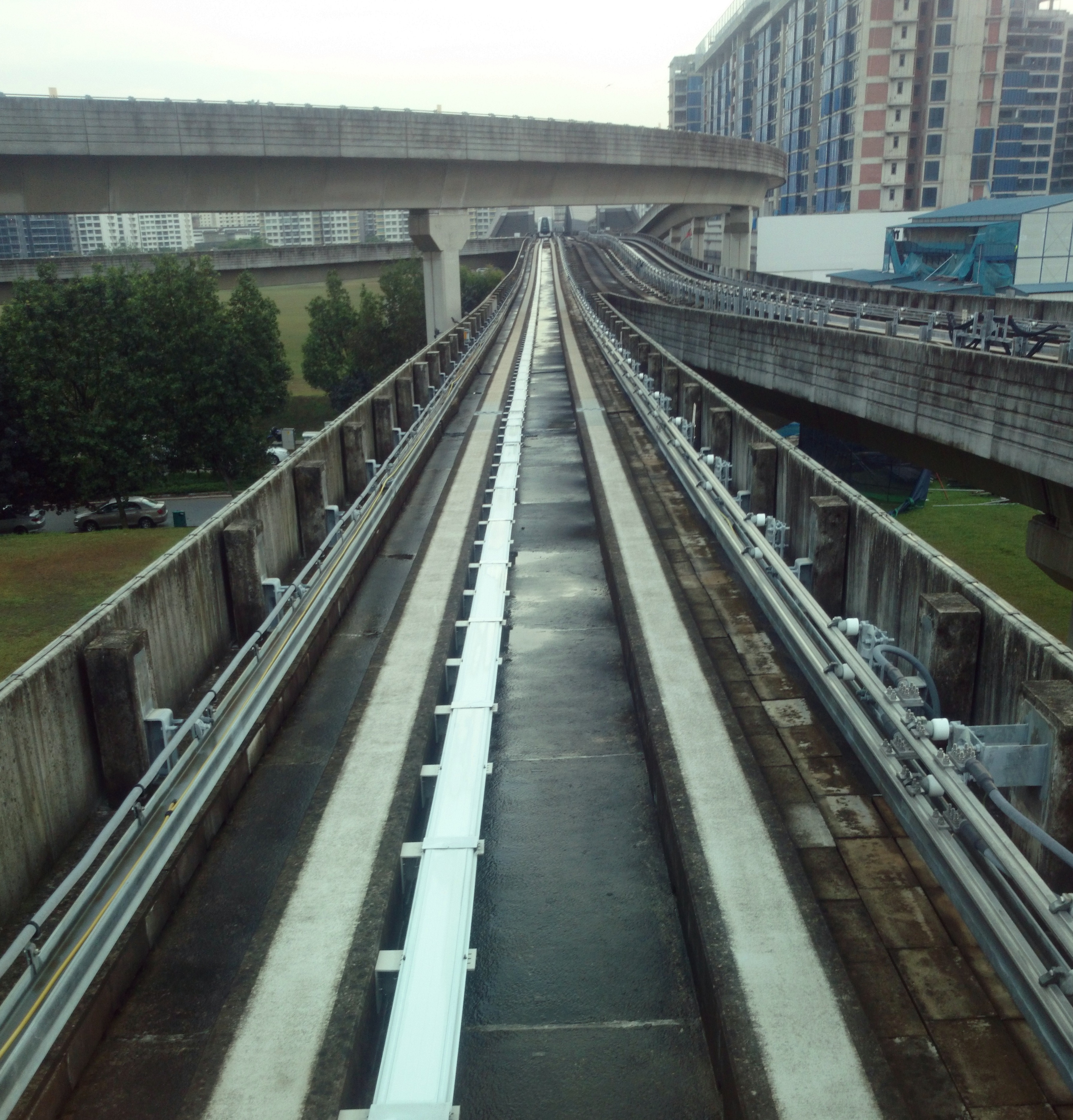
Guideway of the Light Rail Transit system, Singapore, on which rubber-tyred automated people-mover vehicles operate

=== Ballastless track ===
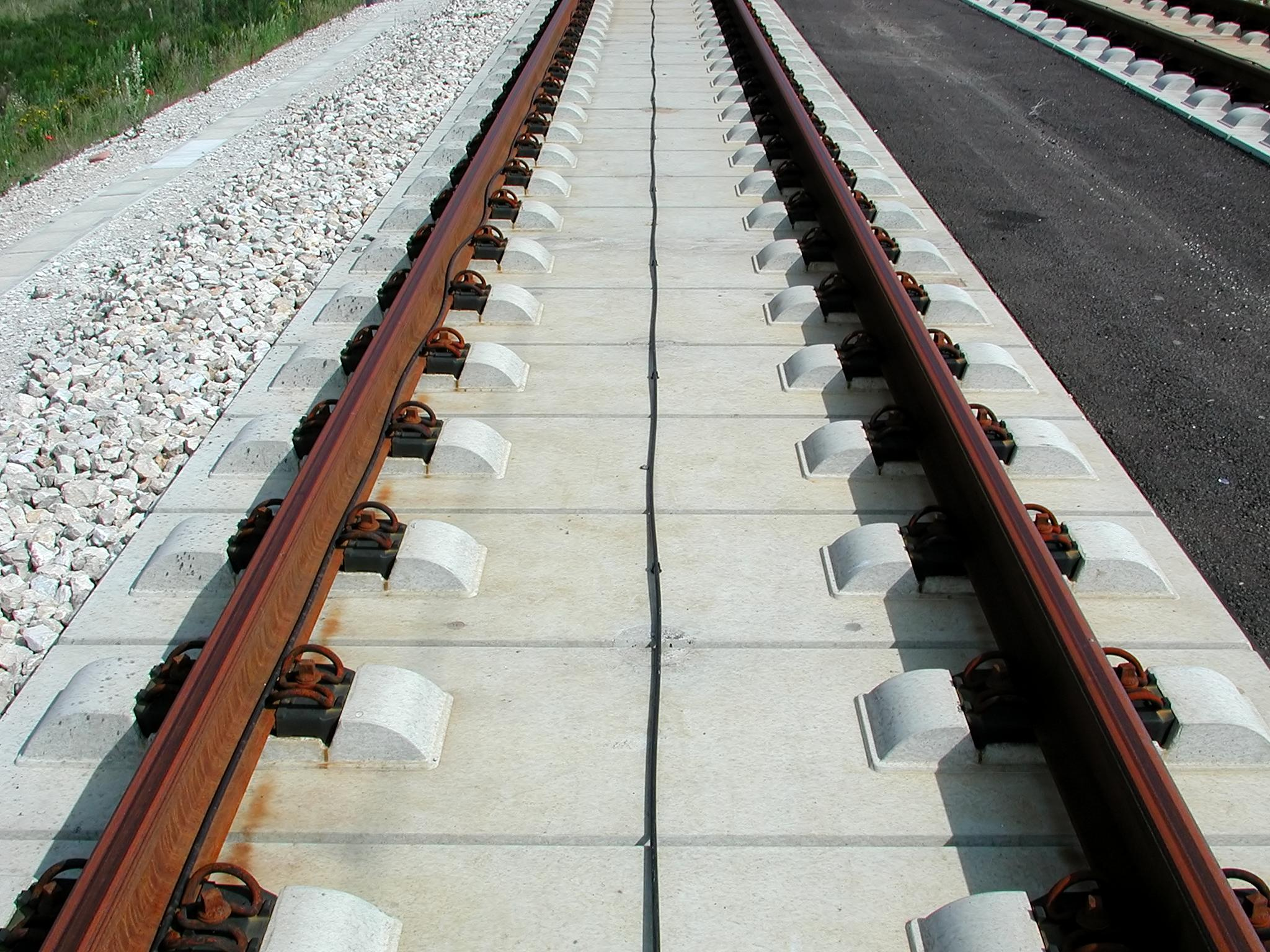
Slab track with flexible noise-reducing rail fixings, built by German company Max Bögl, on the Nürnberg–Ingolstadt high-speed line

A disadvantage of traditional track structures is the high maintenance demand, particularly for surfacing (tamping) and lining, to restore the desired track geometry and smoothness of vehicle running. Weaknesses of the subgrade and drainage deficiencies also lead to heavy maintenance costs. This can be overcome by using ballastless track. In its simplest form, this consists of a continuous slab of concrete (like a highway structure) with the rails supported directly on its upper surface (using a resilient pad).

There are many proprietary systems; variations include a continuously reinforced concrete slab and precast prestressed concrete units laid on a base layer. Many design permutations have been put forward.

However, ballastless track has a high initial cost, and for existing railroads, upgrading to it requires closing the route for an extended period. Its whole-life cost can be lower due to reduced maintenance. Ballastless track is usually considered for new very high-speed or very high-loading routes, in short extensions that require additional strength (e.g., railway stations), or for localised replacement where there are exceptional maintenance difficulties, for example, in tunnels. Most rapid transit lines and rubber-tyred metro systems use ballastless track.

=== Continuous longitudinally supported track ===
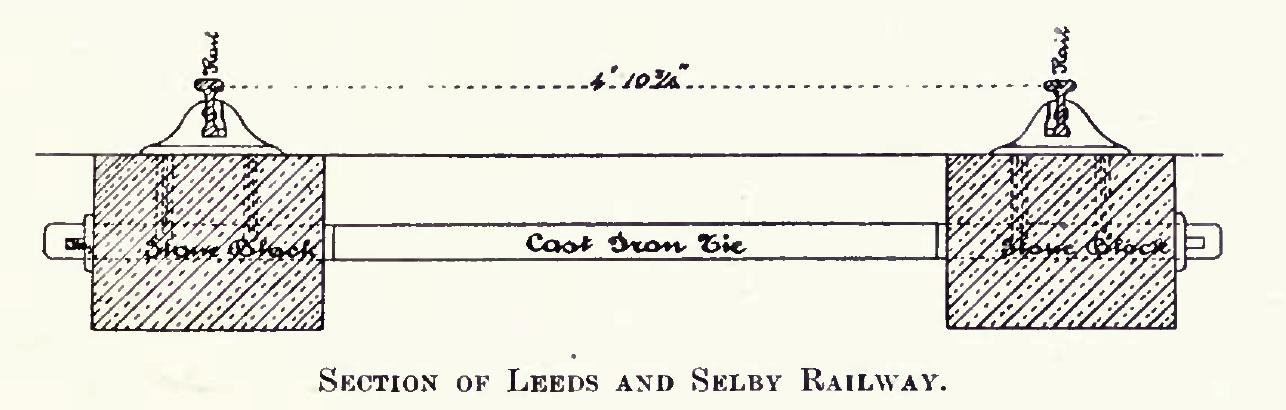
Diagram of cross section of 1830s ladder type track used on the Leeds and Selby Railway

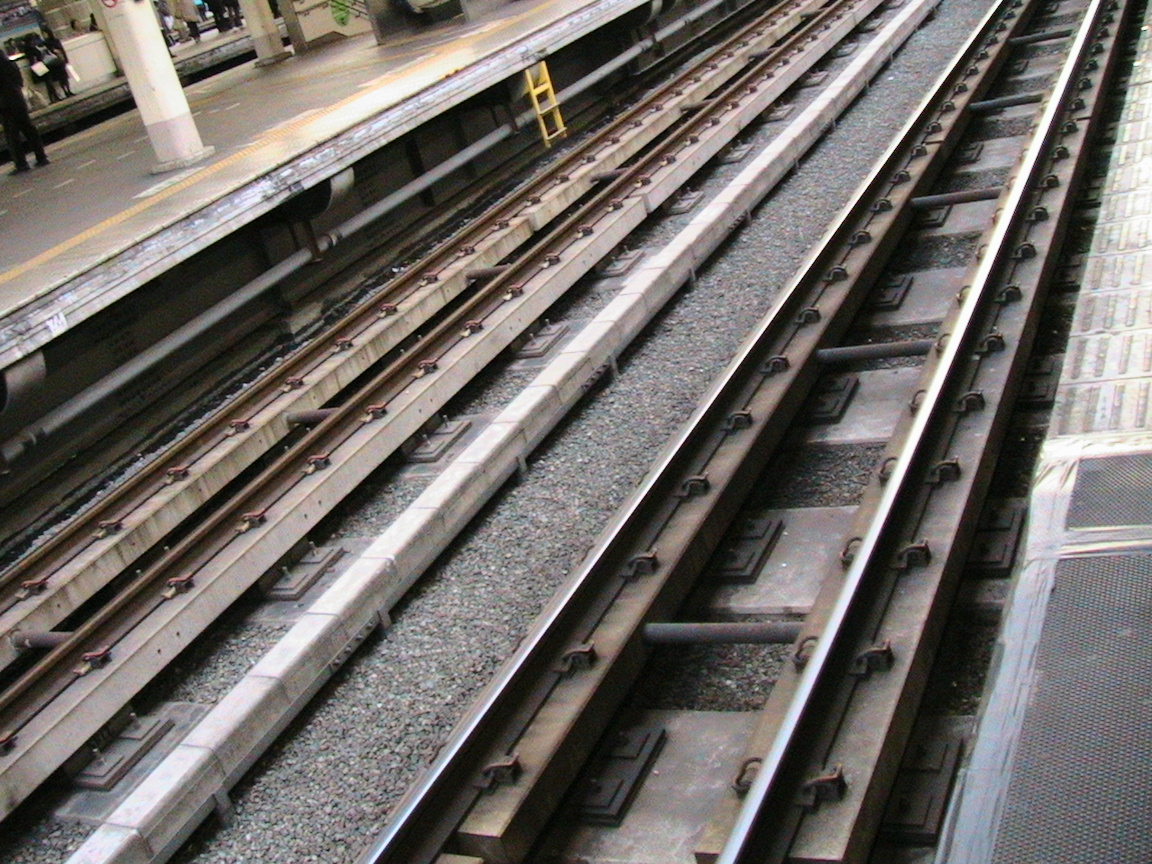
Ladder track at Shinagawa Station, Tokyo, Japan

Early railways (c. 1840s) experimented with continuous bearing railtrack, in which the rail was supported along its length, with examples including Brunel's baulk road on the Great Western Railway, as well as use on the Newcastle and North Shields Railway, on the Lancashire and Yorkshire Railway to a design by John Hawkshaw, and elsewhere. Continuous-bearing designs were also promoted by other engineers. The system was tested on the Baltimore and Ohio railway in the 1840s, but was found to be more expensive to maintain than rail with cross sleepers.

This type of track still exists on some bridges on Network Rail, where the timber baulks are known as waybeams or longitudinal timbers. Generally the speed over such structures is low.

Later applications of continuously supported track include Balfour Beatty's 'embedded slab track', which uses a rounded rectangular rail profile (BB14072) embedded in a slipformed (or pre-cast) concrete base (development 2000s). The 'embedded rail structure', used in the Netherlands since 1976, initially used a conventional UIC 54 rail embedded in concrete, and later developed (late 1990s) to use a 'mushroom' shaped SA42 rail profile; a version for light rail using a rail supported in an asphalt concrete–filled steel trough has also been developed (2002).

Modern ladder track can be considered a development of baulk road. Ladder track utilizes sleepers aligned in the same direction as the rails, with rung-like gauge-restraining cross members. Both ballasted and ballastless types exist.

== Rail ==
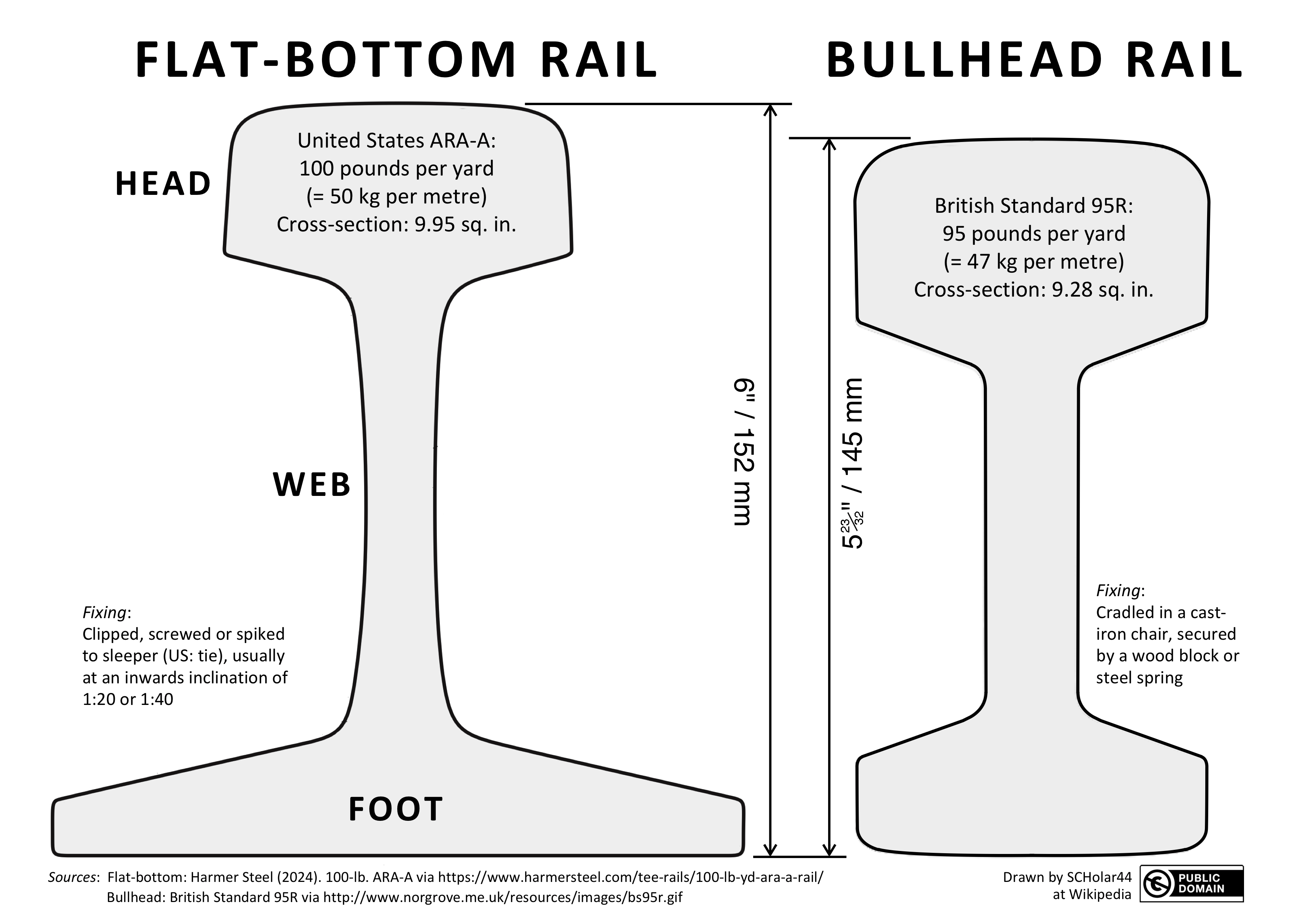
Cross-sections of rail. Left: flat-bottomed rail, which is spiked, screwed or clipped directly to a sleeper (CwthE) or crosstie (AE), or through a steel baseplate, which protects the sleeper. Right: bullhead rail, an older design used mainly in the UK, which sits in a cast-iron chair with a timber or spring-steel key to keep it secure.

Modern track typically uses hot-rolled steel with a profile of an asymmetrical rounded I-beam.

Other profiles of rail include: bullhead rail; grooved rail; flat-bottomed rail (Vignoles rail or flanged T-rail); bridge rail (inverted U–shaped used in baulk road); and Barlow rail (inverted V).

North American railroads until the mid- to late-20th century used rails 39 feet (11.9 m) long so they could be carried in gondola cars (open wagons), often 40 feet (12.2 m) long; as gondola sizes increased, so did rail lengths.

According to the Railway Gazette International the planned-but-cancelled 150-kilometre rail line for the Baffinland Iron Mine, on Baffin Island, would have used older carbon steel alloys for its rails, instead of more modern, higher performance alloys, because modern alloy rails can become brittle at very low temperatures.

=== Iron-topped wooden rails ===
Early North American railroads used iron on top of wooden rails as an economy measure but gave up this method of construction after the iron came loose, began to curl, and intruded into the floors of the coaches, leading early railroaders to refer to them as "snake heads".

The Deeside Tramway in North Wales used this form of rail. It opened around 1870 and closed in 1947, with long sections still using these rails. It was one of the last uses of iron-topped wooden rails.

=== Rail classification (weight) ===
Rail is graded by its linear density, that is, its mass over a standard length. Heavier rail can support greater axle loads and higher train speeds without sustaining damage than lighter rail, but at a greater cost. In North America and the United Kingdom, rail is graded in pounds per yard (usually shown as pound or lb), so 130-pound rail would weigh 130 lb/yd (64 kg/m). The usual range is 115 to 141 lb/yd (57 to 70 kg/m). In Europe, rail is graded in kilograms per metre and the usual range is 40 to 60 kg/m (81 to 121 lb/yd). The heaviest mass-produced rail was 155 pounds per yard (77 kg/m), rolled for the Pennsylvania Railroad.

== Rail lengths ==
The rails used in rail transport are produced in sections of fixed length. Rail lengths are made as long as possible, as the joints between rails are a source of weakness. Throughout the history of rail production, lengths have increased as manufacturing processes have improved.

=== Timeline ===
The following are lengths of single sections produced by steel mills, without any thermite welding. Shorter rails may be welded with flashbutt welding, but the following rail lengths are unwelded.

- (1767) (United Kingdom) Richard Reynolds laid the first iron rails at Coalbrookdale.
- (1825) (United Kingdom) 15 feet (4.57 m) Stockton and Darlington Railway 5.6 lb/yd (2.78 kg/m)
- (1830) (United Kingdom) 15 feet (4.57 m) Liverpool and Manchester Railway. Fish-belly rails at 35 lb/yd (17.4 kg/m), laid mostly on stone blocks
- (1831) 15 feet (4.6 m) long and weighing 36 pounds per yard (17.9 kg/m), reached Philadelphia the first use of the flanged T-rail in the United States
- (1880) 39 feet (11.89 m) United States to suit 40-foot-long (12.19 m) gondola cars
- (1928) (United Kingdom) 45 and 60 feet (13.72 and 18.29 m) London, Midland and Scottish Railway
- (1950) (United Kingdom) 60 feet (18.29 m) British Rail
- (1900) (United Kingdom) 71 ft (21.6 m) – steel works weighing machine for rails (steelyard balance)
- (1940s) (United States) 78 feet (23.77 m) – double 39 ft
- (1953) 45 feet (13.72 m) Australia

Welding of rails into longer lengths was first introduced around 1893, making train rides quieter and safer. With the introduction of thermite welding after 1899, the process became less labour-intensive and ubiquitous.

- (1895) (Germany) Hans Goldschmidt developed exothermic welding
- (1899) (Germany) the Essen Tramway became the first railway to use thermite welding; also suited track circuits
- (1904) (United States) George Pellissier welded the Holyoke Street Railway, first to use the process in the Americas
- (1935) (United States) Charles Cadwell developed non-ferrous exothermic welding
- (1950) (Australia) 240 ft (73.2 m) welded – (4 x 60 feet or 18.3 metres)

Modern production techniques allowed the production of longer unwelded segments.

- (2007) (United Kingdom) 108 metres (354.3 ft) Corus (now British Steel (2016–present))
- (2011) (France) 108 metres (354.3 ft) Tata Steel Europe
- (2011) (Austria) 120 metres (393.7 ft) Voestalpine,
- (2011) (India) 121 metres (397.0 ft) Jindal
- (2014) (Japan) 150 metres (492.1 ft) Nippon Steel

=== Multiples ===
Newer longer rails tend to be made as simple multiples of older shorter rails, so that old rails can be replaced without cutting and the same wagons can be used for transportation. Some cutting would be needed as slightly longer rails are needed on the outside of sharp curves compared to the rails on the inside.

=== Boltholes ===
Rails can be supplied pre-drilled with bolt holes for fishplates, or without, in which case they will be welded into place. There are usually two or three boltholes at each end.

== Joining rails ==
Rails are produced in fixed lengths and need to be joined end-to-end to make a continuous surface on which trains may run. The traditional method of joining the rails is to bolt them together with metal fishplates (joint bars in the US), producing jointed track. For more modern usage, particularly where higher speeds are required, the lengths of rail may be welded together to form continuous welded rail (CWR).

=== Jointed track ===
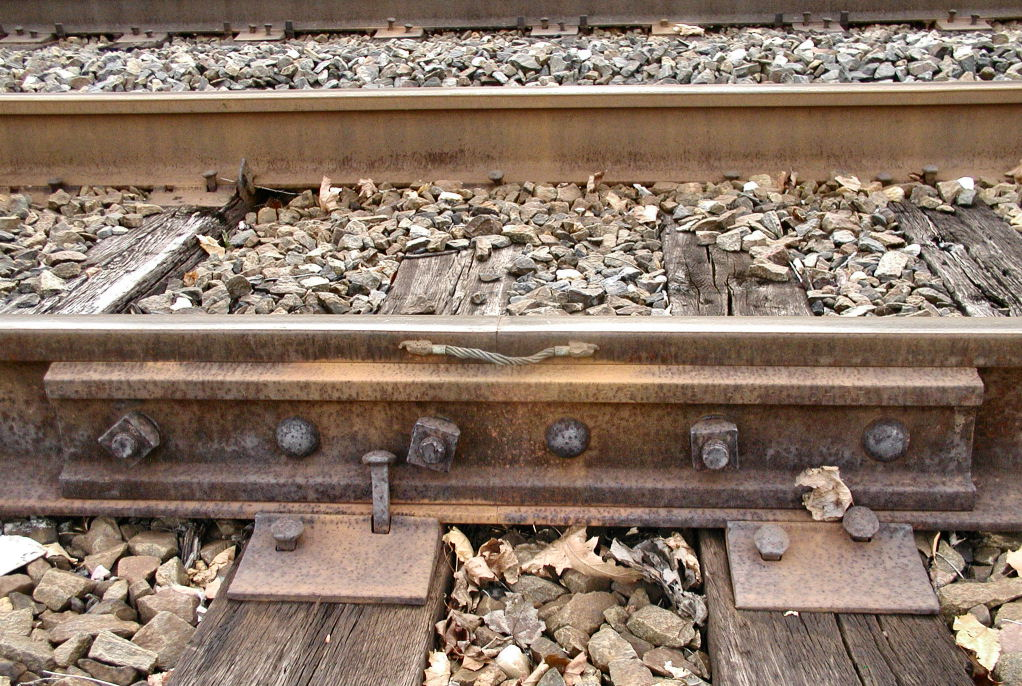
Mainline, six-bolt rail joint on a segment of 155 lb/yd (76.9 kg/m) rail. The alternating bolt head orientation prevents joint separation should a derailed wheel strike the bolts. The electrical bonding jumper connects the two rails to maintain continuity of the track circuit.

Jointed track is made using lengths of rail, usually about 20 m (66 ft) long (in the UK) and 39 or 78 ft (12 or 24 m) long (in North America), bolted together using perforated steel plates known as fishplates (UK) or joint bars (North America).

Fishplates are usually 600 mm (2 ft) long and are used in pairs on either side of the rail ends and bolted together (usually four, but sometimes six bolts per joint). The bolts have alternating orientations so that in the event of a derailment and a wheel flange striking the joint, only some of the bolts will be sheared, reducing the likelihood of the rails misaligning with each other and worsening the derailment. This technique is not universally applied; in European practice, all bolt heads are on the same side of the rail.

Small gaps which function as expansion joints are deliberately left between the rail ends to allow for expansion of the rails in hot weather. European practice was to have the rail joints on both rails adjacent to each other; North American practice is to stagger them. Because of these small gaps, trains passing over jointed tracks make a "clickety-clack" sound, and over time, the rail ends are deflected downwards. Unless it is well maintained, a jointed track does not have the ride quality of welded rail and is not suitable for high-speed trains. However, jointed track is still used in many countries on lower-speed lines and sidings, and is used extensively in poorer countries due to its lower construction costs and the simpler equipment required for installation and maintenance.

A major problem with jointed track is cracking around the bolt holes, which can lead to the rail head (the running surface) breaking. This was the cause of the Hither Green rail crash, which caused British Rail to begin converting much of its track to continuous welded rail.

==== Insulated joints ====
Where track circuits exist for signalling purposes, insulated block joints are required. These compound the weaknesses of ordinary joints. Specially-made glued joints, where all the gaps are filled with epoxy resin, increase the strength again.

As an alternative to the insulated joint, audio frequency track circuits can be employed using a tuned loop formed in approximately 20 m (66 ft) of the rail as part of the blocking circuit. Some insulated joints are unavoidable within turnouts.

Another alternative is an axle counter, which can reduce the number of track circuits and, in turn, the number of insulated rail joints required.

=== Continuous welded rail ===
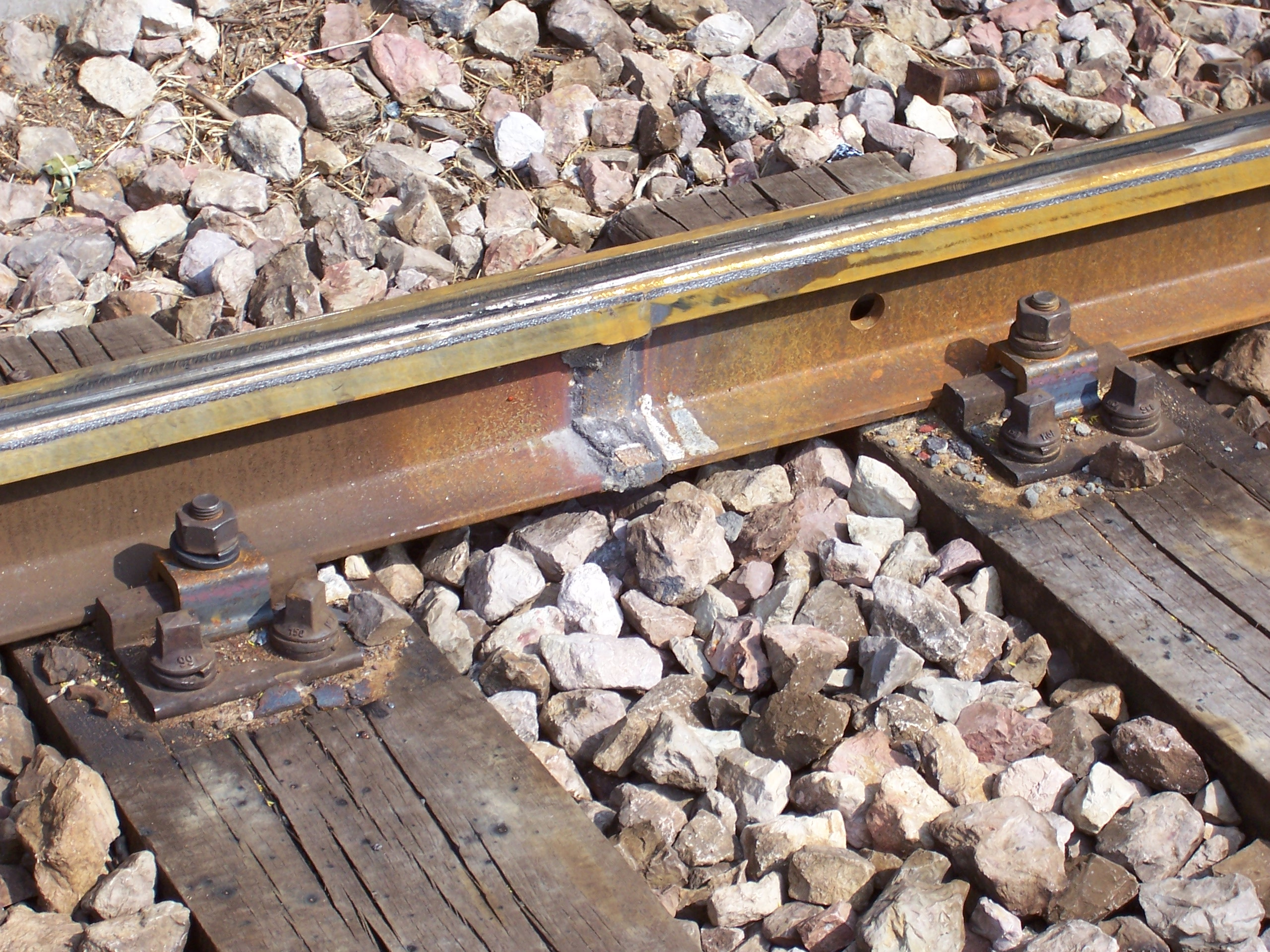
Welded rail joint

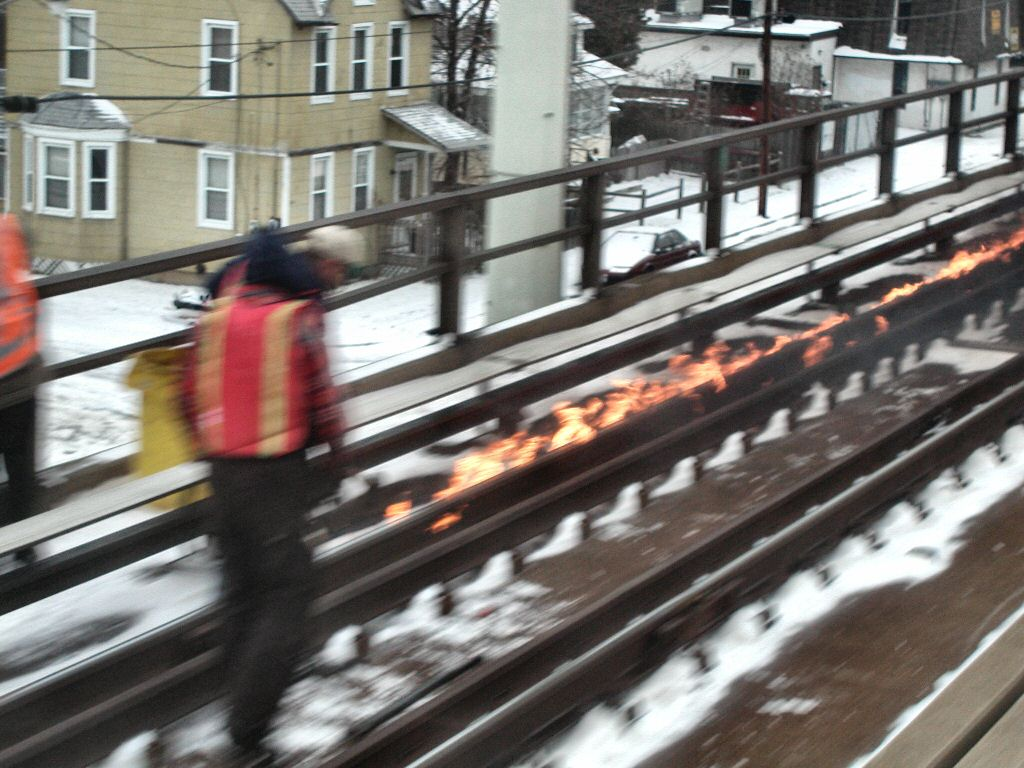
A pull-apart on the Long Island Rail Road Babylon Branch being repaired by using flaming rope to expand the rail back to a point where it can be joined together

Most modern railways use continuous welded rail, sometimes referred to as ribbon rails or seamless rails. In this form of track, the rails are welded together using flash butt welding to form a single continuous rail that may be several kilometres long. Because there are few joints, this form of track is very strong, provides a smooth ride, and requires less maintenance; trains can travel on it at higher speeds with less friction. Welded rails are more expensive to lay than jointed tracks, but have much lower maintenance costs. The first welded track was used in Germany in 1924. and has become common on main lines since the 1950s.

The preferred process of flash butt welding involves an automated track-laying machine running a strong electric current through the touching ends of two unjoined rails. The ends become white hot due to electrical resistance and are then pressed together, forming a strong weld. Thermite welding is used to repair or splice together existing continuous welded rail segments. This manual process requires a reaction crucible and a form to contain the molten iron.

North American practice is to weld 1/4-mile-long (400 m) segments of rail at a rail facility and load it on a special train to carry it to the job site. This train is designed to carry many rail segments, which are positioned to slide off their racks at the rear of the train and be attached to the ties (sleepers) in a continuous operation.

If unrestrained, rails would expand in hot weather and contract in cold weather. To provide this restraint, the rail is prevented from moving relative to the sleeper by clips or anchors. Attention needs to be paid to compacting the ballast effectively, including under, between, and at the ends of the sleepers, to prevent the sleepers from moving. Anchors are more common for wooden sleepers, whereas most concrete or steel sleepers are fastened to the rail by special clips that resist longitudinal movement of the rail. There is no theoretical limit to how long a welded rail can be. However, if longitudinal and lateral restraints are insufficient, the track could become distorted in hot weather, leading to a derailment. Distortion due to heat expansion is known in North America as sun kink, and elsewhere as buckling. In extreme hot weather, special inspections are required to monitor sections of track known to be problematic. In North American practice, extreme temperatures will trigger slow orders to allow crews time to react to buckling or "sun kinks" if encountered. The German railway company Deutsche Bahn is starting to paint rails white to lower the peak temperatures reached in summer days.

After new rail segments are laid or defective rails are replaced (welded in), the rails can be artificially stressed if the rail temperature at laying is cooler than desired. The stressing process involves either heating the rails, causing them to expand, or stretching the rails with hydraulic equipment. They are then fastened (clipped) to the sleepers in their expanded form. This process ensures that the rail will not expand much further in subsequent hot weather. In cold weather, the rails try to contract, but because they are firmly fastened, they cannot. In effect, stressed rails are a bit like a piece of stretched elastic firmly fastened down. In extremely cold weather, rails are heated to prevent "pull aparts".

Continuous welded rails, complete with fastenings, are laid at a temperature known as the "rail neutral temperature," which is approximately midway between the extremes experienced at that location. This installation procedure is intended to prevent tracks from buckling in summer heat or pulling apart in the winter cold. In North America, because broken rails are typically detected by an interruption in the signalling system's current, they are considered less of a hazard than undetected heat kinks.

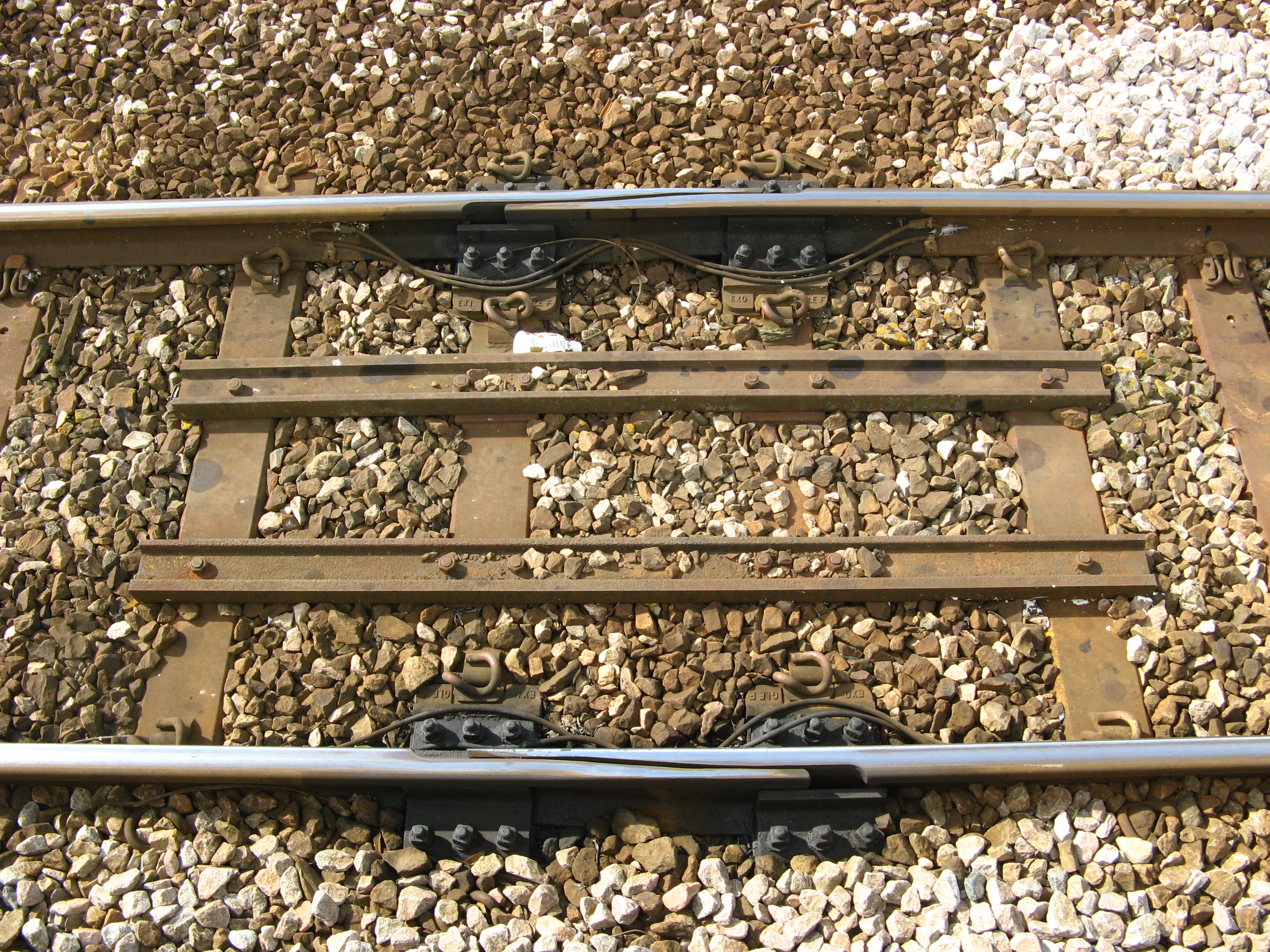
An expansion joint on the Cornish Main Line, England

Joints are used in continuous welded rail when necessary, typically to accommodate signal-circuit gaps. Instead of a joint that passes straight across the rail, the two rail ends are sometimes cut at an angle to give a smoother transition. In extreme cases, such as at the ends of long bridges, a breather switch (referred to in North America and Britain as an expansion joint) provides a smooth path for the wheels while allowing one rail to expand relative to the next.

== Sleepers ==
A sleeper (tie or crosstie) is a rectangular object on which the rails are supported and fixed. The sleeper has two main roles: to transfer loads from the rails to the track ballast and the ground beneath, and to hold the rails at the correct width apart (to maintain the rail gauge). They are generally laid transversely to the rails.

=== Fixing rails to sleepers ===
Various methods exist for fixing the rail to the sleeper. Historically, rails were spiked directly onto ties, a practice that gave way to baseplates fitted between the rails and sleepers; subsequently, spikes were replaced by sprung steel clips, such as Pandrol clips, to secure the rails to the baseplates.

== Portable track ==
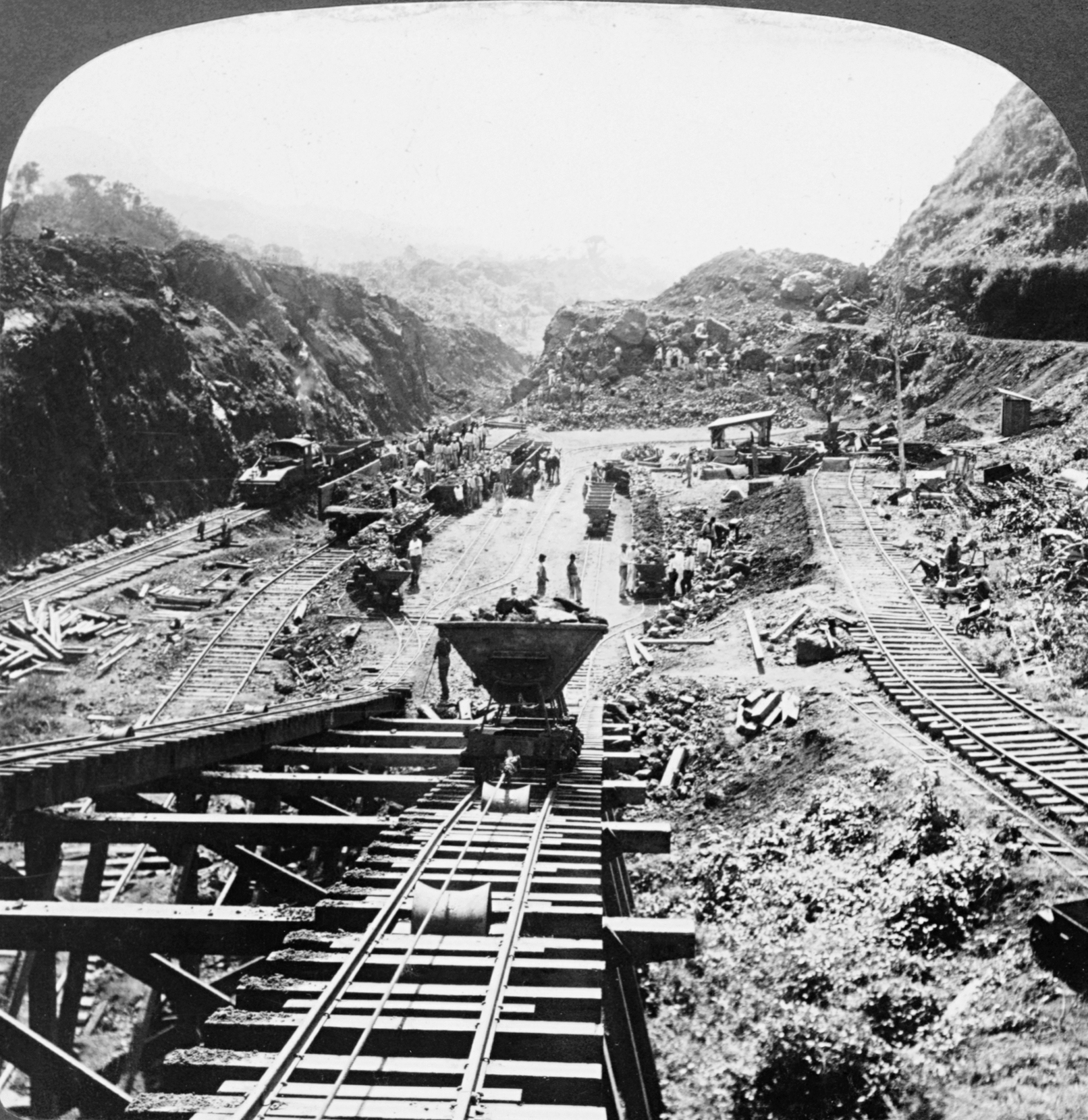
Panama Canal construction track, 1907

Sometimes, rail tracks are designed to be portable and moved from one place to another as required. During construction of the Panama Canal, tracks were moved around excavation works. These track gauges were 5 ft (1,524 mm) and the rolling stock was full size. Portable tracks have often been used in open-pit mines. In 1880 in New York City, sections of heavy portable track (along with much other improvised technology) helped in the move of the ancient obelisk in Central Park to its final location from the dock where it was unloaded from the cargo ship SS Dessoug.

Cane railways often had permanent tracks for the main lines, with portable tracks serving the canefields themselves. These tracks were narrow-gauge (for example, 2 ft (610 mm)), and the portable track came in straights, curves, and turnouts, much like a model railway.

Decauville was a source of many portable light rail tracks, also used for military purposes. The permanent way is so called because temporary way tracks were often used in the construction of that permanent way.

== Layout ==
The geometry of the tracks is inherently three-dimensional. Still, the standards governing speed limits and other regulations for track gauge, alignment, elevation, curvature, and track surface are usually presented in two separate layouts for the horizontal and vertical planes.

Horizontal layout is the track layout on the horizontal plane. This involves the layout of three main track types: tangent track (straight line), curved track, and track transition curve (also called transition spiral or spiral) which connects between a tangent and a curved track.

Vertical layout is the track layout on the vertical plane including the concepts such as crosslevel, cant and gradient.

A sidetrack is a railroad track other than siding that is auxiliary to the main track. The word is also used as a verb (without object) to refer to the movement of trains and railcars from the main track to a siding, and in common parlance to refer to giving in to distractions apart from a main subject. Sidetracks are used by railroads to order and organise the flow of rail traffic.

=== Gauge ===
Measuring rail gauge

During the early days of rail, there was considerable variation in the gauge used by different systems, and in the UK during the railway building boom of the 1840s Brunel's broad gauge of 7 ft 1/4 in (2,140 mm) was in competition with what was referred to at the time as the 'narrow' gauge of 1,435 mm (4 ft 8 1/2 in). Eventually, the 1,435 mm (4 ft 8 1/2 in) gauge won the battle, and became the standard gauge, with the term 'narrow gauge' henceforth used for gauges narrower than the new standard. As of 2017, about 60% of the world's railways use a gauge of 1,435 mm (4 ft 8 1/2 in), known as standard or international gauge Gauges wider than standard gauge are called broad gauge; narrower, narrow gauge. Some stretches of track are dual gauge, with three (or sometimes four) parallel rails in place of the usual two, to allow trains of two different gauges to use the same track.

A gauge can safely vary over a range. For example, U.S. federal safety standards allow standard gauge to vary from 4 ft 8 in (1,420 mm) to 4 ft 9 1/2 in (1,460 mm) for operation up to 60 mph (97 km/h).

== Maintenance ==
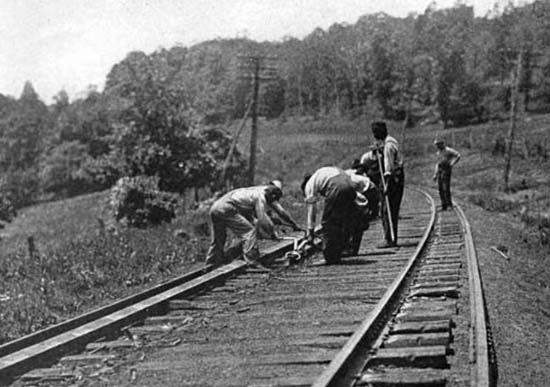
Circa 1917, an American section gang (gandy dancers) responsible for maintenance of a particular section of railway. One man is holding a lining bar (gandy), while others are using rail tongs to position a rail. Superelevation (cant) is clearly evident on the curve.

Track needs regular maintenance to remain in good order, especially when high-speed trains are involved. Inadequate maintenance may lead to a "slow order" (North American terminology, or temporary speed restriction in the United Kingdom) being imposed to avoid accidents (see Slow zone). Track maintenance was at one time hard manual labour, requiring teams of labourers, or trackmen (US: gandy dancers; UK: platelayers; Australia: fettlers or packers) under the supervision of a skilled ganger, who used lining bars to correct irregularities in horizontal alignment (line) of the track, and tamping and jacks to correct vertical irregularities (surface). Currently, maintenance is facilitated by a variety of specialised machines.

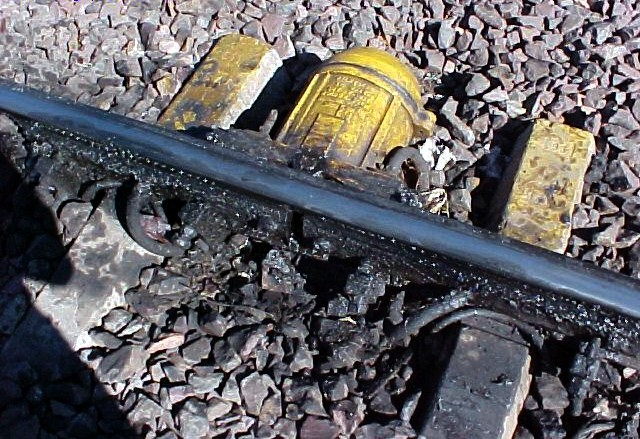
Flange oilers lubricate wheel flanges to reduce rail wear in tight curves, Middelburg, Mpumalanga, South Africa

The surface of the head of each of the two rails can be maintained by using a railgrinder.

Common maintenance jobs include changing sleepers, lubricating and adjusting switches, tightening loose track components, and surfacing and lining track to keep straight sections straight and curves within maintenance limits. The process of sleeper and rail replacement can be automated by using a track renewal train.

Spraying ballast with herbicide to prevent weeds from growing through and redistributing the ballast is typically done with a special weed-killing train.

Over time, ballast is crushed or moved by the weight of trains passing over it, periodically requiring relevelling ("tamping") and eventually needing to be cleaned or replaced. If this is not done, the tracks may become uneven, causing swaying, rough riding, and possibly derailments. An alternative to tamping is to lift the rails and sleepers and reinsert the ballast beneath. For this, specialist "stoneblower" trains are used.

Rail inspections utilize nondestructive testing methods to detect internal flaws in the rails. This is done by using specially equipped HiRail trucks, inspection cars, or, in some cases, handheld inspection devices.

Rails must be replaced before the railhead profile wears to a degree that may trigger a derailment. Worn mainline rails usually have sufficient life remaining to be used on a branch line, siding, or stub afterward and are "cascaded" to those applications.

The environmental conditions along the railroad track create a unique railway ecosystem. This is particularly true in the United Kingdom, where steam locomotives are used only on special services and vegetation has not been trimmed back as thoroughly. This creates a fire risk in prolonged dry weather.

In the UK, the cess is used by track repair crews to walk to a work site and to stand safely when a train is passing. This helps with minor work while keeping trains running by eliminating the need for a Hi-railer or transport vehicle to block the line to move crew to the site.

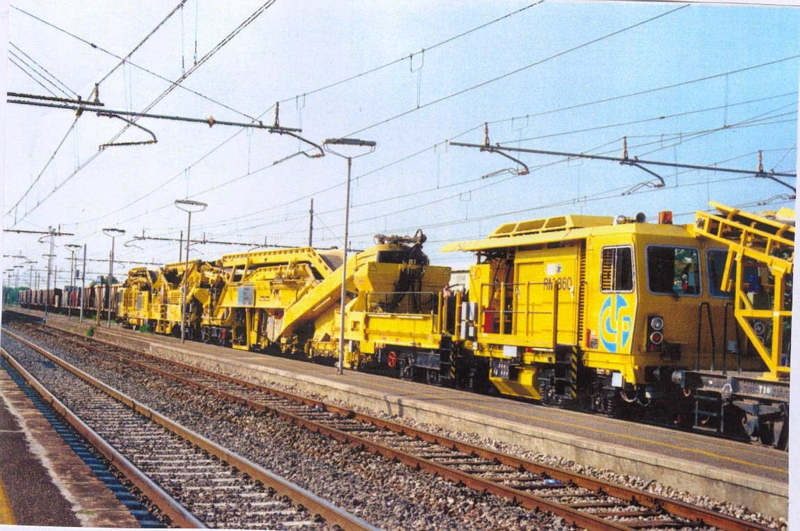
Maintenance of way equipment in Italy

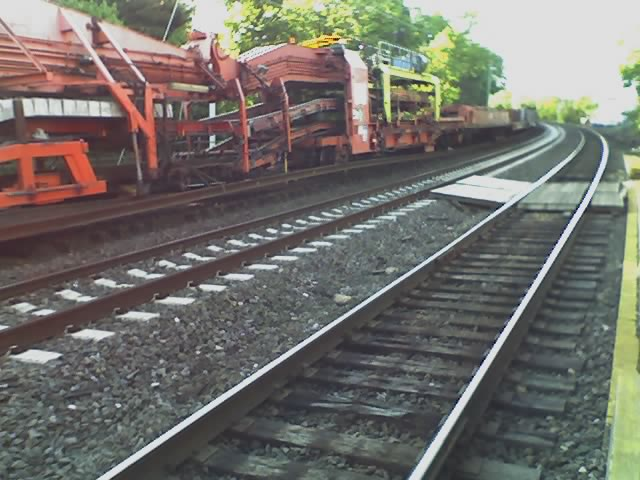
A track renewal train in Pennsylvania

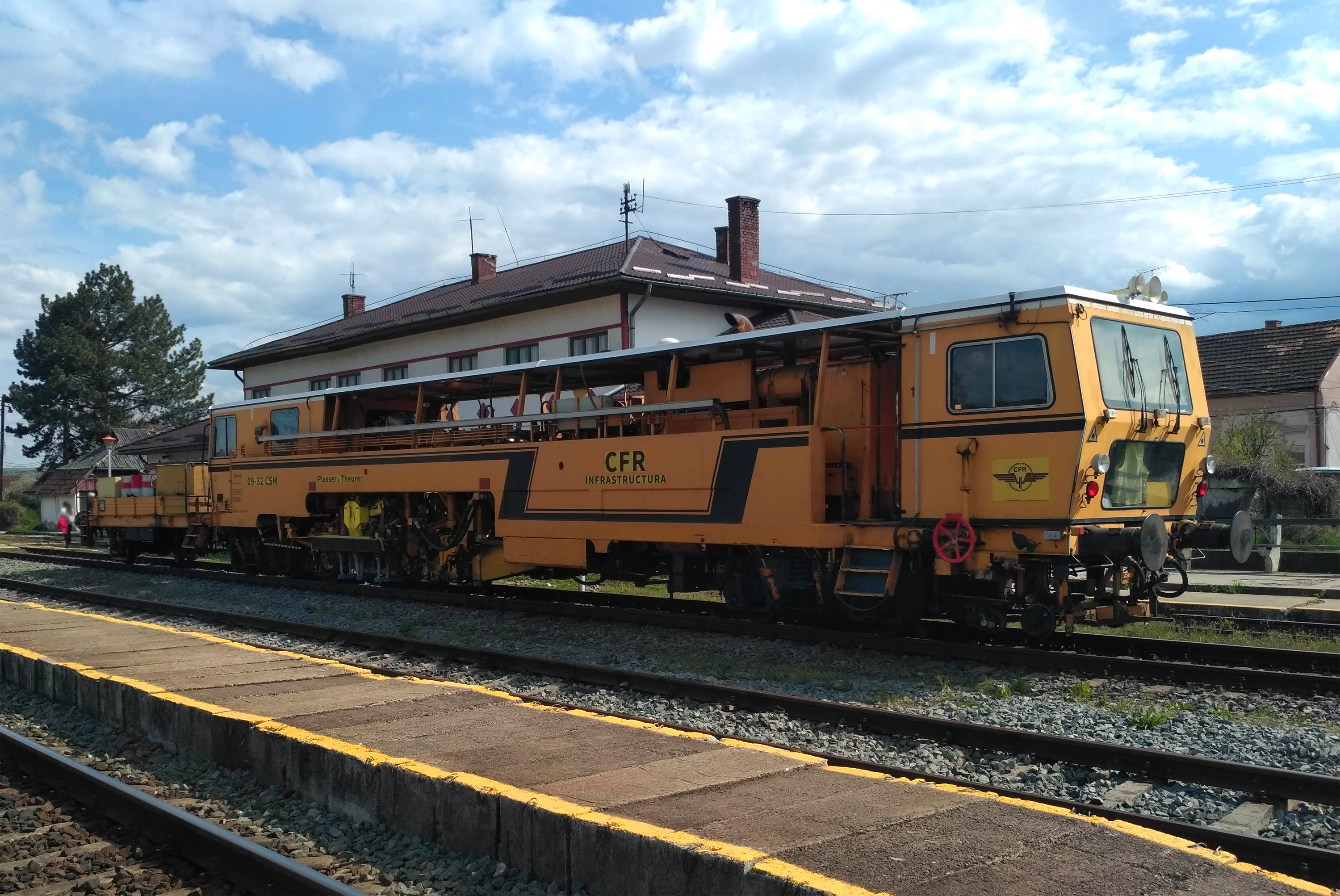
Plasser & Theurer 09-32 CSM continuous action levelling, lining and tamping machine of the Romanian Railways

== Bed and foundation ==
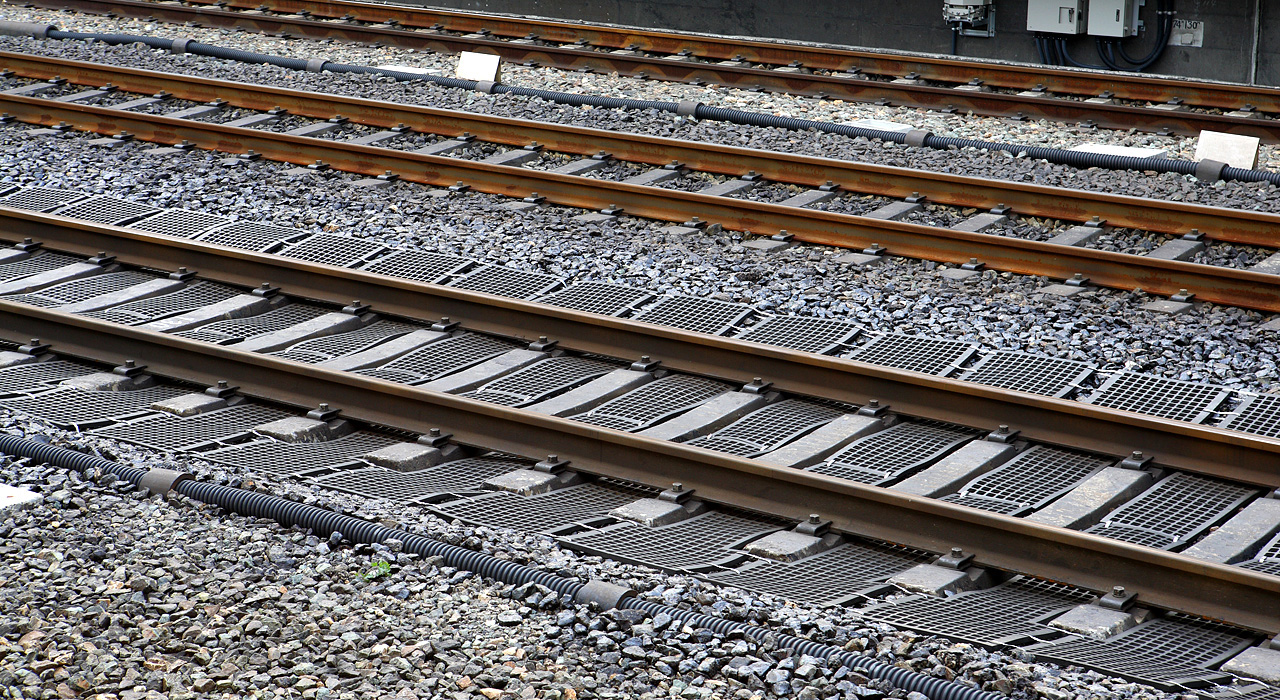
On this Japanese high-speed line, mats have been added to stabilize the ballast.

Railway tracks are generally laid on a bed of stone track ballast or track bed, which in turn is supported by prepared earthworks known as the track formation. The formation comprises the subgrade and a layer of sand or stone dust (often sandwiched in impervious plastic), known as the blanket, which restricts the upward migration of wet clay or silt. There may also be layers of waterproof fabric to prevent water from penetrating to the subgrade. The track and ballast form the permanent way. The foundation may refer to the ballast and formation, i.e., all manufactured structures below the tracks.

Some railroads are using asphalt pavement beneath the ballast to keep dirt and moisture from entering the ballast and spoiling it. The fresh asphalt also serves to stabilize the ballast so it does not move around so easily.

Additional measures are required where the track is laid over permafrost, such as on the Qingzang Railway in Tibet. For example, transverse pipes through the subgrade allow cold air to penetrate the formation and prevent the subgrade from melting.

=== Geosynthetic reinforcement ===
Geosynthetics are used worldwide to reduce or replace traditional layers in trackbed construction and rehabilitation, improving track support and reducing maintenance costs. Reinforcement geosynthetics, such as geocells (which rely on 3D soil confinement mechanisms) have demonstrated efficacy in stabilizing soft subgrade soils and reinforcing substructural layers, thereby limiting progressive track degradation. Reinforcement geosynthetics increase soil bearing capacity, limit ballast movement and degradation, and reduce differential settlement that affects track geometry. They also reduce construction time and cost, while reducing environmental impact and carbon footprint. The increased use of geosynthetic reinforcement solutions is supported by new high-performance geocell materials (e.g., NPA - Novel Polymeric Alloy), published research, case studies projects and international standards (ISO, ASTM, CROW/SBRCURnet)

The hybrid use of high-performance geogrids at the subgrade and high-performance geocells in the upper subbase/subballast layer has been shown to increase the reinforcement factor beyond the sum of their individual contributions; it is particularly effective in attenuating heaving of expansive subgrade clay soils. A field test project on Amtrak's NE Corridor suffering clay mud-pumping demonstrated how the hybrid solution significantly improved track quality index (TQI), reduced track geometry degradation, and lowered track surface maintenance by a factor of 6.7x utilizing high-performance NPA geocell. Geosynthetic reinforcement is also used to stabilize railway embankments, which must be robust enough to withstand repeated cyclical loading. Geocells can utilize recycled marginal or poorly graded granular material to create stable embankments, making railway construction more economical and sustainable.

== Buses ==
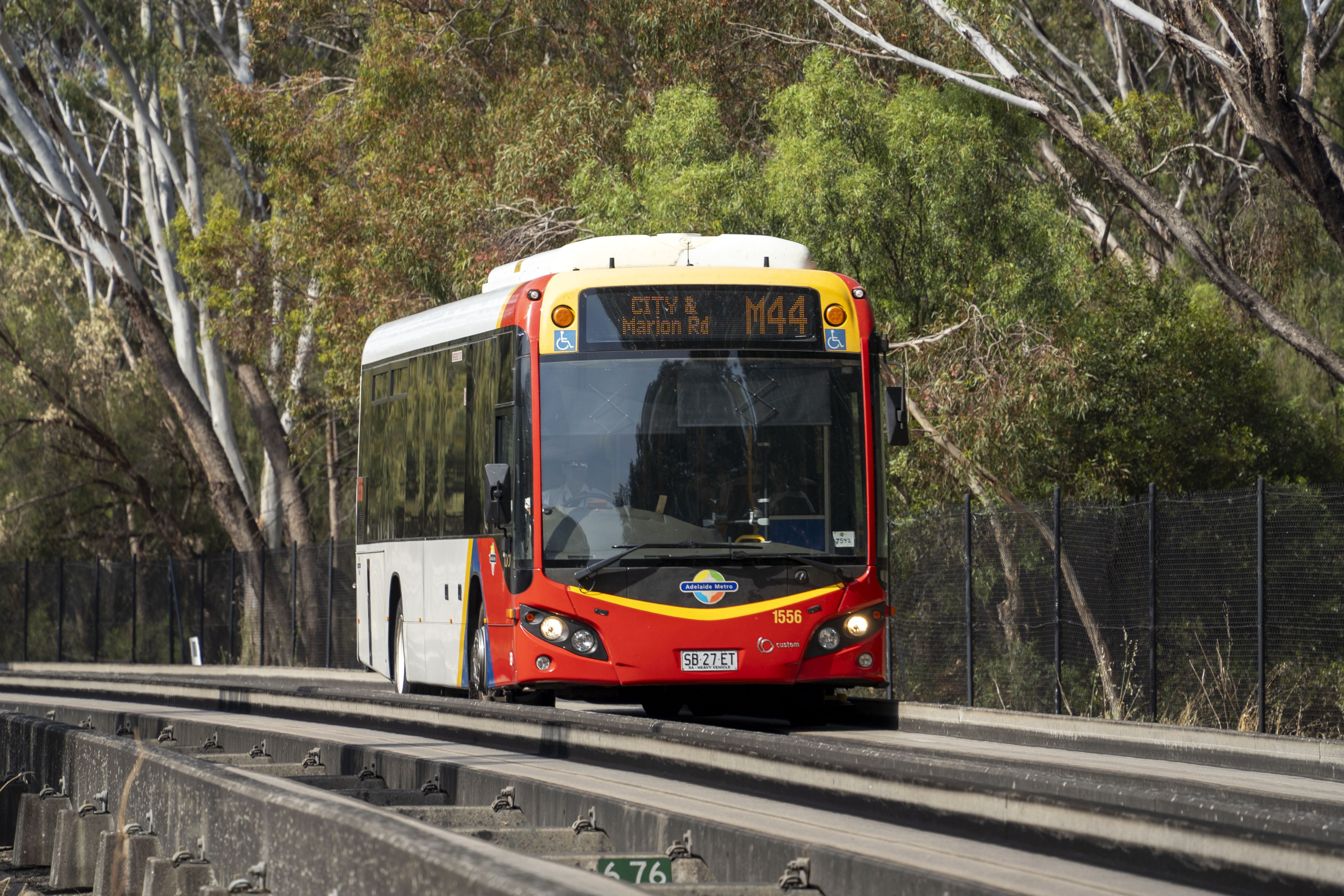
Bus on a guided busway, Adelaide, Australia

Some buses can use tracks. This concept originated in Germany and was called O-Bahn. The first such track, the O-Bahn Busway, was built in Adelaide, Australia.

== See also ==
- Degree of curvature
- Difference between train and tram rails
- Exothermic welding
- Gauntlet track
- Glossary of rail terminology
  (including US/UK and other
  regional/national differences)
- Green track
- Maglev
- Minimum railway curve radius
- Monorail
- Permanent way (history)
- Rack railway
- Rail profile
- Roll way, part of the track of a rubber-tyred metro
- Rubber-tyred metro
- Street running
- Subgrade
- Tie plate
- Tramway (industrial)
- Tramway track

== Bibliography ==
- Pike, J., (2001), Track, Sutton Publishing, ISBN 0-7509-2692-9
- Firuziaan, Mohammad; von Estorff, Otto (October 2002). "Simulation of the Dynamic Behavior of Bedding-Foundation-Soil in the Time Domain". System Dynamics and Long-Term Behaviour of Railway Vehicles, Track and Subgrade. Springer Verlag. pp. 357–376. doi:10.1007/978-3-540-45476-2_21. ISBN 978-3-540-43892-2.
- Robinson, A.M. (2009). Fatigue in railway infrastructure. Woodhead Publishing Limited. ISBN 978-1-85573-740-2.
- Lewis, R (2009). Wheel/rail interface handbook. Woodhead Publishing Limited. ISBN 978-1-84569-412-8.
- Esveld, Coenraad (2001). Modern Railway Track. The Netherlands: MRT-Productions. ISBN 90-800324-3-3.
