= Neoloy Geocell =

Cellular confinement system

Neoloy Geocells (Cellular Confinement System)
- Type: Rigid NPA Tough-Cell geocell
- Inventor: PRS Geo-Technologies
- Inception: 2006
- Manufacturer: PRS Geo-Technologies
- Website: https://www.prs-med.com
- Notes; 3D mechanical soil stabilization solution used in geotechnical & civil engineering, landscape architecture, infrastructure construction

The Neoloy Geocell (previously under the Neoweb trademark) is a Cellular Confinement System (geocell) developed and manufactured by PRS Geo-Technologies Ltd. Geocells are extruded in ultrasonically welded strips. The folded strips are opened on-site to form a 3D honeycomb matrix, which is then filled with granular material. The 3D confinement system is used to stabilize soft subgrade soil and reinforce the subbase and base layers in flexible pavements. Cellular confinement is also used for soil protection and erosion control for slopes, including channels, retention walls, reservoirs and landfills.

== Material ==
Neoloy Geocells are manufactured from novel polymeric alloy (NPA). As stated in ASTM D8269-21:Standard Guide for Use of Geocells in Geotechnical and Roadway Projects: “geocells made from different types of materials, sizes, strengths, etc. may behave or perform differently from one another; therefore, it is important to understand and utilize proper material properties that relate to its performance…” NPA has improved dynamic stiffness (elastic modulus), resistance to permanent deformation (creep) and tensile strength, compared to HDPE, a widely used polymer used for geocells. Research has shown a rigid geocell material better retains the geocell geometry (dimensional stability) confinement and reinforcement. These geocell performance parameters are critical for the requirements of base-layer reinforcement of heavy-duty pavements and infrastructure. Reinforcement with high modulus geocells also optimizes pavement design by enabling a longer design life and lower maintenance cycles/costs.

== History ==
The geocell concept was originally developed by the US Army Corps of Engineers in cooperation with Presto Products in the 1970s as "sand-grids" to improve the soft subgrades of unpaved roads for short-term use by heavy military vehicles (Webster and Alford, 1977). PRS Geo-Technologies (est. 1996) began manufacture of Neoloy brand of geocells (a.k.a. Tough-Cells). A polymer alloy based on a polyolefin matrix reinforced by polyamide nano-fibers (NPA) was developed with improved stiffness and durability to extend its service life under low deformation levels. Geocells made from NPA have material properties to maximize the magnitude of mechanical stabilisation for the project design life in applications such as the structural pavements, embankments and high retention walls.

== Research ==
Extensive research on exploring geocell reinforcement for roadway applications at the University of Kansas, as well as at other geotechnical/civil engineering research institutes, such as the Indian Institute of Technology (Madras), ⁣ University of Delaware, ⁣ Clausthal University (Germany) and Columbia University (NY). The research described the mechanisms and influencing factors of geocell reinforcement, evaluated its effectiveness in improving roadway performance and developed design methods for roadway applications. The research ⁣ included laboratory box tests, accelerated moving wheel tests, field demonstration, actual projects and development of design methods. Comparative test results showed that Neoloy Geocells made from NPA improved stiffness, bearing capacity, stress distribution and reduced deformation considerably (Pokharel, et al. 2011 and 2009).

== Applications ==
Neoloy Geocells are suitable for use in basal reinforcement of asphalt paved roads, due to high tensile strength, resistance to permanent deformation and dynamic (elastic) stiffness under cyclical load stresses. Neoloy Geocells are typically used in soil stabilization and layer reinforcement of pavement types, such as highways, railways, ports, storage yards and unpaved haul, access and service roads. An example of an unpaved road project under difficult conditions in Afghanistan was undertaken by the UK Royal Engineering Corps Route Trident to create a secure patrol road for the benefit of troops and civilians alike.

== Design methodologies ==
Research included the integration of Neoloy Geocells in existing road design methodologies. Standard ISO/TR18228-5: Design Using Geosynthetics: Part 5: Stabilisation utilizes the concepts of serviceability and ultimate limit states to effectively withstand service loading, control deformation within service requirements, and over time. The design life of the project is proposed as a key design consideration, which means limiting the rate and level of deformation of the geosynthetic stabilisation accordingly. Geocells have shown to stiffen granular materials by 3D confinement, thereby increasing the modulus of the stabilized layer; this is the Modulus Improvement Factor (MIF). The stiffer the geocell, the higher the hoop tensile strength will be and thus the higher the MIF. A reliable method for quantifying the Neoloy Geocell contribution to a pavement structure, the Modulus Improvement Factor (MIF) of 1.5-5 - dependent upon the material of infill, subgrade and location of reinforced layer - was obtained from field tests, laboratory tests and finite element studies.

== Sustainable transportation ==
Neoloy Geocells may be considered a sustainable road construction method. By improving the structural properties of low strength materials, Neoloy Geocells can replace quarry aggregate with marginal, lower strength materials, such as locally available sand; recycled and reclaimed construction materials (RAP and recycled concrete). Not only does the use of such materials in road construction conserve quarry resources and recycle waste. It also reduces quarry, haul and infill activities, which in turn decrease the amounts of fuel, pollution and the carbon footprint for projects. A pavement reinforced with geosynthetics can also increase the lifespan of pavement structures, which improves its sustainability by reducing repairs and maintenance.

== How it works ==
When Neoloy Geocells are deployed and compacted with soil/aggregate, a composite structure is created from the geotechnical interaction of the material, soil and geometry. Soil confinement retains infill materials in three dimensions providing high tensile strength on each axis. Under loading, Neoloy Geocells generate lateral confinement, while soil-to-cell wall friction reduces vertical movement. The high hoop strength of the cell walls, together with the passive earth and passive resistance of adjacent cells, also increases soil strength and stiffness. Aggregate abrasion is minimized by the cell confinement, thereby reducing attrition of the base material. Vertical loading on Neoloy Geocells with compacted infill creates a semi-rigid slab or “beam effect” in the structure. This distributes the load evenly and effectively over a wider area, thereby increasing bearing capacity and decreasing differential settlement. Research on the reinforcement mechanisms in geocells shows that the stiffness of the geocell material as well as geometry are the most important confinement parameters.

== Environmental durability ==
NPA based Neoloy Geocells are an inert engineering thermoplastic, non-corrosive, non-leaching, and resistant to extreme environmental, weather and soil conditions, such as those in deserts, saturated peat bogs and arctic tundra. Additives provide retention of its engineering properties under long-term exposure to UV radiation and oxidation.

== See also ==
- Cellular Confinement Systems (geocells)
- Route TRIDENT
- Geosynthetics
