= Route Trident =

Road in Afghanistan

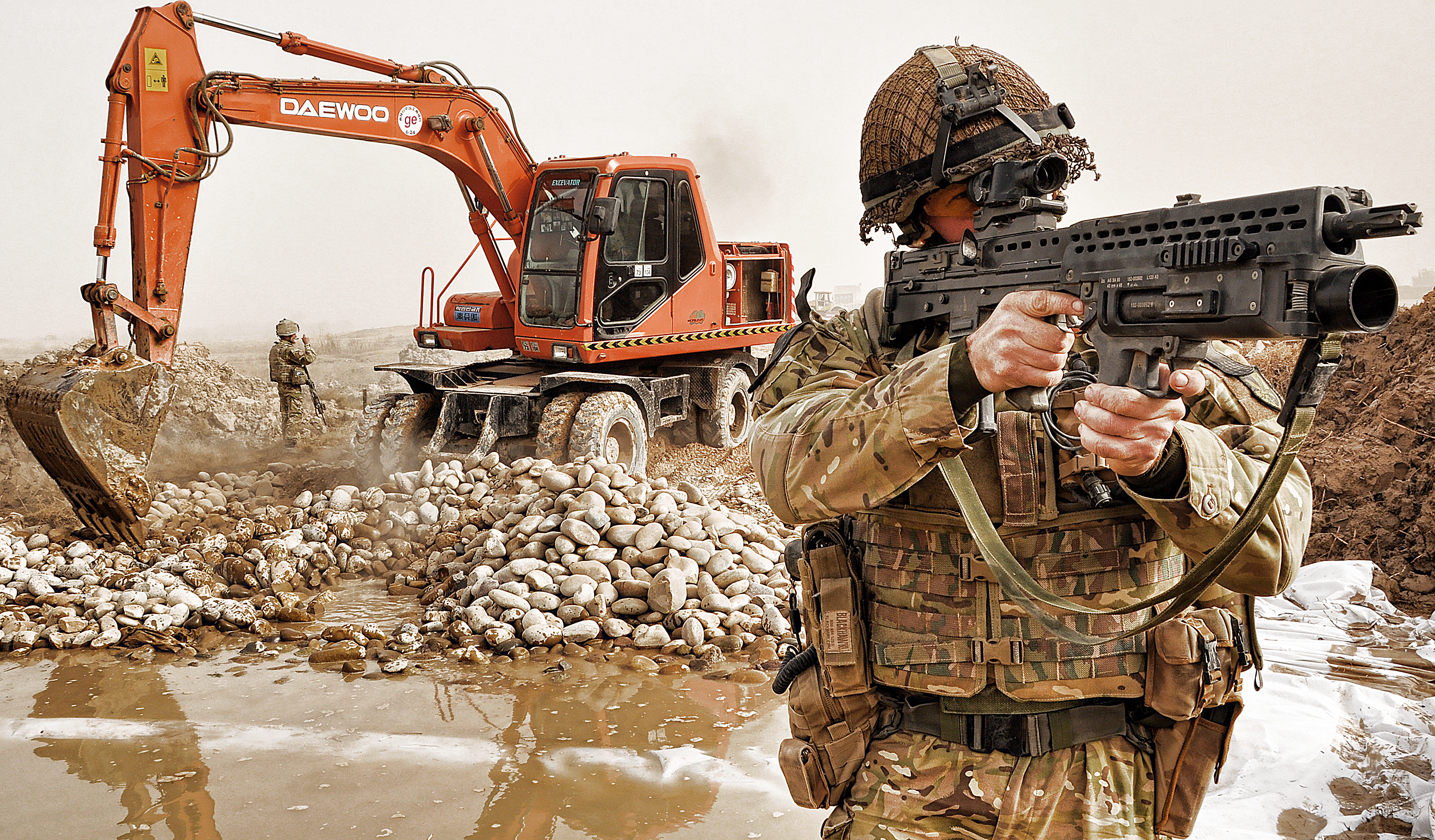
A soldier keeps watch during construction of Route Trident in January 2011.

Route Trident (known locally as the New or Big Road) was built by the British Army's Royal Engineers in Helmand Province, Afghanistan. The construction of the road was codenamed Operation Lar Jarowel by the Ministry of Defence. Route Trident (named after the Regimental emblem of 28 Engineer Regiment—the Amphibious Engineers who have the Trident as their emblem) replaced an older road that was vulnerable to attack by insurgents on convoys supplying three patrol bases established in the Gholam Dastagir Kalay area as part of Operation Panther's Claw. In the immediate aftermath of operation the Light Dragoons Battlegroup were suffering casualties as they tried to secure the area and resupply their patrol bases. The attacks resulted in the deaths of two British servicemen and led to the cancellation of the convoys, forcing the bases to be resupplied by air.

Following a meeting between the Commanding Officer of the Light Dragoons (Lt Col Fair) and Commanding Officer of 28 Engineer Regiment (Lt Col MTG Bazeley) it was decided that a new and easier to protect road would be constructed by the Royal Engineers. 28 Engineer Regiment had used a Neoloy Geocell cellular confinement system for road construction on an exercise in the UK prior to deployment and this was considered to be a practical option to reduce aggregate cost and provide a barrier to the planting of IEDs. Construction began in December 2009 and was completed in March 2010, during which time the construction teams and security forces came under frequent attack. This was the first road to be built under fire since British operations in the Dhofar Rebellion in the early 1970s, the completed road allowed resupply convoys to travel its length in about 30 minutes, compared to 36 hours along the old road. The success of the project led to the approval of plans for an extension to connect the provincial capital Lashkargah with the economic capital of Grishk. Construction of the extension began in July 2010 and was completed in April 2011.

== Background ==
Location of Gholam Dastagir Kalay in Afghanistan

Route Trident was constructed to connect three patrol bases and a number of checkpoints in the area around Gholam Dastagir Kalay, which lies between Lashkargah and Grishk, in Helmand Province, Afghanistan. The patrol bases had been built by the Light Dragoons Battle Group in the aftermath of the Operation Panther's Claw advance in Summer 2009. The patrol bases were garrisoned by the Coldstream Guards during Op HERRICK XI (Sept 09 - Mar 10) and were initially resupplied by land transport on the old Babaji Road (Route MARS, which was a dirt track. The Babaji area was one of the most violent parts of Helmand and the road was targeted by the Taliban with Improvised Explosive Devices (IEDs). The poor security was partly a result of the lack of a significant Afghan security force presence and the absence of a functioning local government.

During 2009 two British soldiers were killed and 17 injured while completing a resupplying patrol to Patrol Base 4. The land convoys were subsequently stopped and replaced by aerial resupply with helicopters and Hercules transport aircraft. The use of aircraft used up valuable resources of the local British logistics system and the Coldstream Guards were often forced to fight to reach the air dropped supplies. The British Army decided to construct a road to allow better resupply of their patrol bases, to stimulate local markets and social movement, to provide greater stability, and to facilitate reconstruction in the area.

== Design ==
Major Adam Foley of the 64 Headquarters and Support Squadron, 28 Engineer Regiment of the Royal Engineers was appointed to be the project designer. The project was the first of its kind to be undertaken in Afghanistan and was allocated a budget of £3.5 million. The road designed was 7.6 kilometres (4.7 mi) long and 6.5 metres (21 ft) wide. One design constraint was that the patrol bases had to be able to see straight along the route to prevent insurgents gaining unmonitored access to the road. Another factor was a 300-metre (980 ft) wide wadi known as the Suf Mandah that consisted of two water bearing channels. This provided agricultural irrigation for the local people and so could not be interrupted during construction because of its economic importance. The design for this section included a floating roadway over the waterlogged ground and two box culverts for the irrigation channels. The 17 smaller culverts along the route were made from reinforced concrete and stone gabions. The road itself was designed to be of unbound aggregate that could in the future be overlain with an asphalt surfacing.

The cost of construction aggregate in Afghanistan is high (around $250 to $650 per cubic metre) because of security and transport costs, therefore Foley attempted to minimise its use. A series of field trials using various foundation systems was carried out by Major Foley at Camp Bastion to assess the capacity of a Neoloy Geocell cellular confinement system that can be shipped flat but unfolds to form a hollow honeycomb structure that can be backfilled with aggregate and overlain with a wearing course. This allowed a 75 percent reduction in aggregate and a two-thirds cost saving compared to traditional road-building methods. The cellular confinement layer acts as a semi-rigid slab foundation and is designed to maintain the surfacing layer compaction under heavy vehicles and in harsh weather. The foundation also makes it harder for insurgents to plant IEDs under or in the road.

== Construction ==
[The project was] a dream come true for a young engineer officer.

— Second Lieutenant Gareth Parkinson, Royal Engineers.

The construction of Route Trident was begun by the British Army during the second half of Op HERRIcK XI. The project manager appointed for the construction phase was Captain Dick Gale, who had deployed to Afghanistan specifically for this task. The works were carried out by troops from 23 Amphibious Engineer Squadron from 28 Engineer Regiment, commanded by Lieutenant Helen Ladd, which had been in the theatre since October 2009. The management team also included Major Brian Johnston and Staff Sergeant Darren Winter, who acted as foreman of plant. A team of 70 local labourers and plant operators were employed under the "cash-for-work" scheme to supplement the sappers from 23 Squadron.

Construction began at Gholam Dasagir Kalay in mid-December 2009 and progressed to the neighbouring village of Hajji Jamal Kalay and towards the patrol bases through agricultural land and desert. The project took three months to complete and soon came under attack; becoming the first road to be built by the Royal Engineers under fire since British operations against rebel forces in the Dhofar Rebellion in southern Oman in the early 1970s. Methods of attack included small arms, rocket propelled grenades and IEDs; and the construction team came under attack, on average, every few days. The attacks meant that the engineers had to carry full arms and body armour, and camouflage their surveying equipment when setting out and undertaking reconnaissance for the road. In addition units from the 1st Battalion Coldstream Guards Battle Group and the Afghan National Army were brought in to provide protection. International Security Assistance Force (ISAF) and Afghan patrols in the area were also stepped up and unmanned drones engaged enemy combatants preparing to attack construction personnel.

Today marks the end of a large-scale engineering project, the first of its kind. All sappers who have worked on the project hope that it will bring enhanced security to both our own troops and local people in this part of Afghanistan.

— Captain Dick Gale, project manager.

The project encountered several problems not typically associated with road construction. Materials had to be brought in for the road from as far away as Kandahar, Quetta, in Pakistan, and the United Kingdom; and the work was carried out in 50 °C (122 °F) heat. The design was altered as a result of consultations with local Afghans, who wanted, for example, to route the road through villages where possible, to minimise the loss of agricultural land. The Taliban carried out direct attacks and used intimidation to deter workers; at least one was beaten and kidnapped. Despite these difficulties the first supply convoy travelled along the road on 10 March 2010, completing a journey that took 36 hours on the old road in just 30 minutes. The road was officially declared completed on 12 March 2010, and another convoy made the trip that day in just 25 minutes.

== Impact ==
Where once there was an IED-infested dirt track there is now a line of communication which will stimulate trade and save lives.

— Lieutenant Colonel Toby Gray, Commanding Officer, 1st Battalion Coldstream Guards.

Completion of the road meant that supply aircraft could be replaced by land convoys and reallocated to other areas. In addition to its military benefit the road improved the local quality of life with shops, markets, a doctors surgery and a school being built alongside it. There was also an improved sense of security for people in the area, and more patrols were able to move along the road. Such was the feeling that one building contractor felt safe enough to return to Babaji from Lashkargah to offer his services to construct a permanent vehicle checkpoint for the route. The design and construction techniques used in the road were so successful that they are being rolled out to engineering projects across Helmand.

== Extension ==
There are plans to extend Route Trident north and south into the area secured by 11 Light Brigade during Operation Moshtarak. The extended road would link with existing routes to connect Grishk, the economic heart of Helmand, to the provincial capital of Lashkargah. This has been designated as provincial governor Mohammad Gulab Mangal's third highest priority for any activity in Helmand. The route would also provide access for Afghans to the hospitals in Grishk and Lashkargah and has been described as a "critical route to further operations in South Helmand". The extension will connect the region to the main Highway 1 road that connects many of Afghanistan's main cities.

As of 7 July 2010 the two construction battlegroups, working from each end of the new extension, were just 7 kilometres (4.3 mi) apart. The work proved to be challenging, with a large number of culverts having to be installed and high levels of insurgent activity in the area. One local contractor refused to work because of security issues, which resulted in the project being delayed from its original finish date of July to October 2010.

Responsibility for security of the road and its extension passed from the Coldstream Guards to the 1st Battalion Royal Gurkha Rifles Battle Group (RGR) in April 2010. The battle group suffered a loss on 5 July 2010 when Trooper James Leverett of the Royal Dragoon Guards (RDG), attached to the RGR battle group, was killed after the Viking armoured vehicle he was travelling in was struck by an IED. Leverett was providing security for the road expansion when he was killed. Two further soldiers were killed during Route Trident security operations on 21 July 2010. The casualties were Corporal Matthew Stenton, also of the RDG, and Lance Corporal Stephen Monkhouse, of the 1st Battalion Scots Guards. Their deaths occurred near Basharan, north of Lashkargah, after insurgents opened fire on a group of Coyote and Viking vehicles protecting an IED disposal and casualty evacuation.

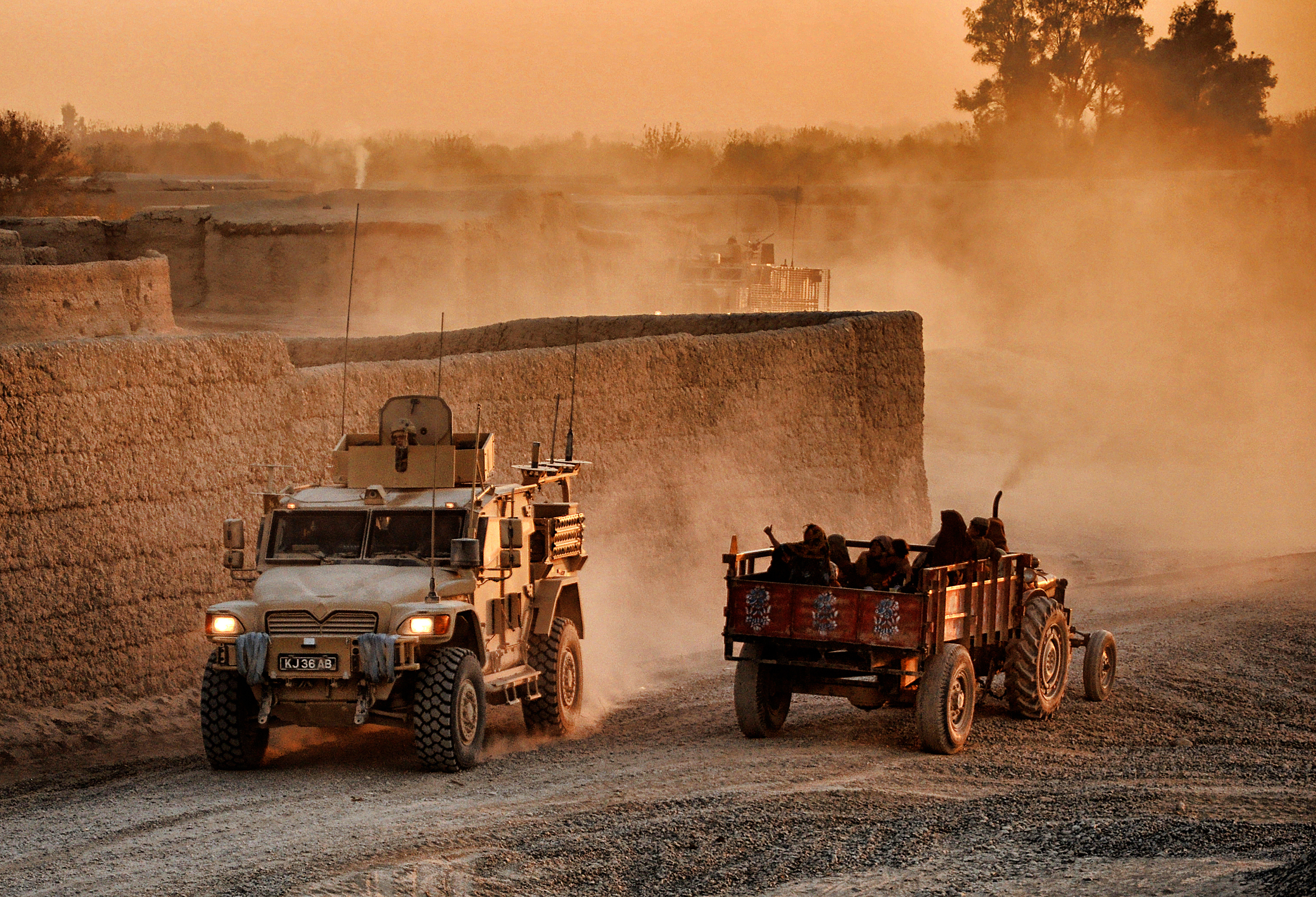
ISAF and Afghan civilian vehicles on Route Trident

By September there was said to be "steady progress" on the extension of the road with elements of 1 Troop of the 1st Armoured Engineer Squadron, 21 Engineer Regiment being brought in from Ripon, Yorkshire to assist. Insurgent attacks had become an almost daily occurrence and halting work was said to be "the insurgents' main effort in [the] area". Operation Oqab Jarawel (in English: Eagle's Build) was launched in October 2010 to provide security for the extension of the route over the Loy Mandeh river. The operation involved elements of 2nd Battalion Royal Regiment of Scotland and the 2nd Royal Tank Regiment working alongside Afghan forces to clear three villages of insurgents and set up new checkpoints to secure the area. The operation was highly successful, resulting in a 90% reduction in attacks in the area and allowing the new bridge to be built by the start of January 2011.

By early October 2010 Route Elephant, which will link with Trident and runs from Highway 1 to Lashkargah, was said to be very successful with a sixfold increase in traffic. As of mid-November 2010 Route Trident was still under construction.

The Route Trident extension between Lashkargah and Grishk was reported as complete on April 15, 2011, and has cut journey times between the two centres from two weeks to just two-and-a-half hours and seen insurgent attacks drop by 90 per cent.
