= Novel polymeric alloy =

Type of polymeric alloy

Novel polymeric alloy
Type	Nano-composite polymeric alloy
Main ingredient	Polyolefin
Additional ingredients	Polyamides, compatibilizers, anti-toxidants, colorants
Density p	0.96 g/cm3
Tensile strength(σ_{t})	19–32 MPa
Elastic limit/Yield	12%
Glass temperature	70°C
Melting point	>200 °C
Linear expansion coefficient (α)	80 ppm°C

Novel polymeric alloy (NPA) is a polymeric alloy composed of polyolefin and thermoplastic engineering polymer with enhanced engineering properties. NPA was developed for use in geosynthetics. One of the first commercial NPA applications was in the manufacturer of polymeric strips used to form Neoloy® cellular confinement systems (geocells).

Novel polymeric alloy was developed as an alternative to high-density polyethylene (HDPE) in geosynthetics. Although HDPE is widely used due to its low cost, ease of manufacturing and flexibility, its relatively high creep, low tensile strength and sensitivity to elevated temperatures limit its use, for example, in long-term, critical geocell applications.

Used in the manufacture of geosynthetics, such as cellular confinement system, novel polymeric alloy provides higher tensile strength and stiffness, and is more durable over dynamic loading and under elevated temperatures than those made from HDPE (Han, 2011). The lifespan of NPA based geosynthetics, such as geocells, makes them suitable for long-term design in infrastructure, such as highways, railways, container yards and high retaining walls.

== Production ==
Novel polymeric alloy (NPA) is compounded for geosynthetic applications, such as high-modulus geocells or geogrids. In geocell applications strips are co-extruded in multi-layer strips. Outer layers are a blend of polyolefins while the core layer is formed from a high performance polymer. The blend is generally immiscible (an alloy), where the high performance polymer is dispersed in a matrix formed by the polyolefins. Since polymer blends are basically unstable, they undergo stabilization during melt processing, at a nano-level combined with compatibilized material.

The novel polymeric alloy core layer/s is made of a high performance polymer compound with a storage modulus of ≥1400 MPa at 23 °C, measured by Dynamic Mechanical Analysis (DMA) at a frequency of 1 Hz according to ASTM D4065; or an ultimate tensile strength of at least 30 MPa. The outer layers are usually made of a polyethylene or polypropylene polymer, with a blend or alloy with other polymers, fillers, additives, fibers and elastomers. The high performance alloys of polyamides, polyesters, and polyurethanes are combined with polypropylene, copolymers, block copolymers, blends and/or other combinations.

== Manufacture ==
While most polypropylene homopolymers are too brittle and most polypropylene copolymers are too soft, certain grades of polypropylene polymers are stiff enough for engineering purposes, yet soft enough so that a geosynthetic can be handled for installation. These polymers are modified, via proprietary treatment processes and the addition of additives such as nanoparticles to attain the required physical properties.

Unlike low crystalline polymers such as polypropylene, which require a post-extrusion processing such as orientation, cross-linking, and/or thermal annealing, higher crystalline polymers such as novel polymeric Alloy can be extruded as strips and welded in section without post-extrusion treatment. The sheet can be extruded into strips and welded, sown, or bonded together to form geosynthetic products. Such additives (stabilizers for polymers) may be selected from, among others, nucleating agents, fillers, fibers, hindered amine light stabilizers (HALS), antioxidants, UV light absorbers, and carbon black in the form of powders, fibers, or whiskers.

== Properties ==
The polyolefin in the novel polymeric alloy polymer blend provides stress cracking resistance, hydrolytic resistance, very low temperature functionality and tear resistance, while the polyamide engineering polymer provides strength, stiffness, retention of mechanical strength at elevated temperatures, creep resistance and long-term dimensional stability. Novel polymeric alloy has a coefficient of thermal expansion CTE less than about 135 ppm/°C; resistance to acidic media greater than polyamide 6 resin and/or resistance to basic media greater than PET resin; resistance to hydrocarbons greater than that of HDPE; creep modulus of > 400 MPa at 25 °C at 20% of yield stress load for 60 minutes (ISO 899-1); and 1 percent secant flexural modulus > 700 MPa at 25 °C (ASTM D790). Novel polymeric alloy has a tensile strength in the range of 19.1 to 32 MPa with an elastic modulus of 440 to 820 MPa (at 2% strain).

== Applications ==
Novel polymeric alloy was developed for a high-modulus geosynthetics, including geocells, geogrids and geomembranes, which require higher strength, stiffness and durability. In a geocell application, the high modulus of Novel Polymeric Alloy means stiff and strong cell walls, which provide a very high elastic response to dynamic loading even after millions of cycles without permanent plastic deformation. The strength and stiffness of novel polymeric alloy, as measured by tensile strength, long-term resistance to deformation, coefficient of thermal expansion (CTE) and performance at elevated temperatures (storage modulus), provides a performance lifespan previously available in geocell applications. This is a notable development in the geosynthetic / geocell industry, allowing the use of geocells for example, in structural reinforcement for flexible pavements, earth retention walls, and other heavy-duty geosynthetic applications, where long-term durability under heavy loading is critical (Leshchinsky, et al., 2009). At the same time, novel polymeric alloy properties enable the manufacture of lighter geocells which retain suitable engineering strength for moderate loading as typically found in slopes, channels and retaining wall applications.

== See also ==
- Cellular Confinement Systems (geocells)
- PRS-Neoweb (Neoloy Geocells)
- Geosynthetics
