= Cellular confinement =

Confinement system used in construction and geotechnical engineering

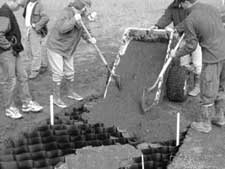
A cellular confinement system being installed on an experimental trail in south-central Alaska

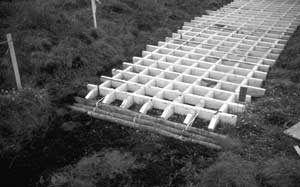
Wood matrix after installation in Wrangell–St. Elias Park in Alaska

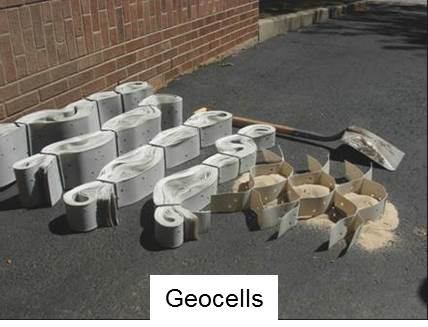
Geocell materials

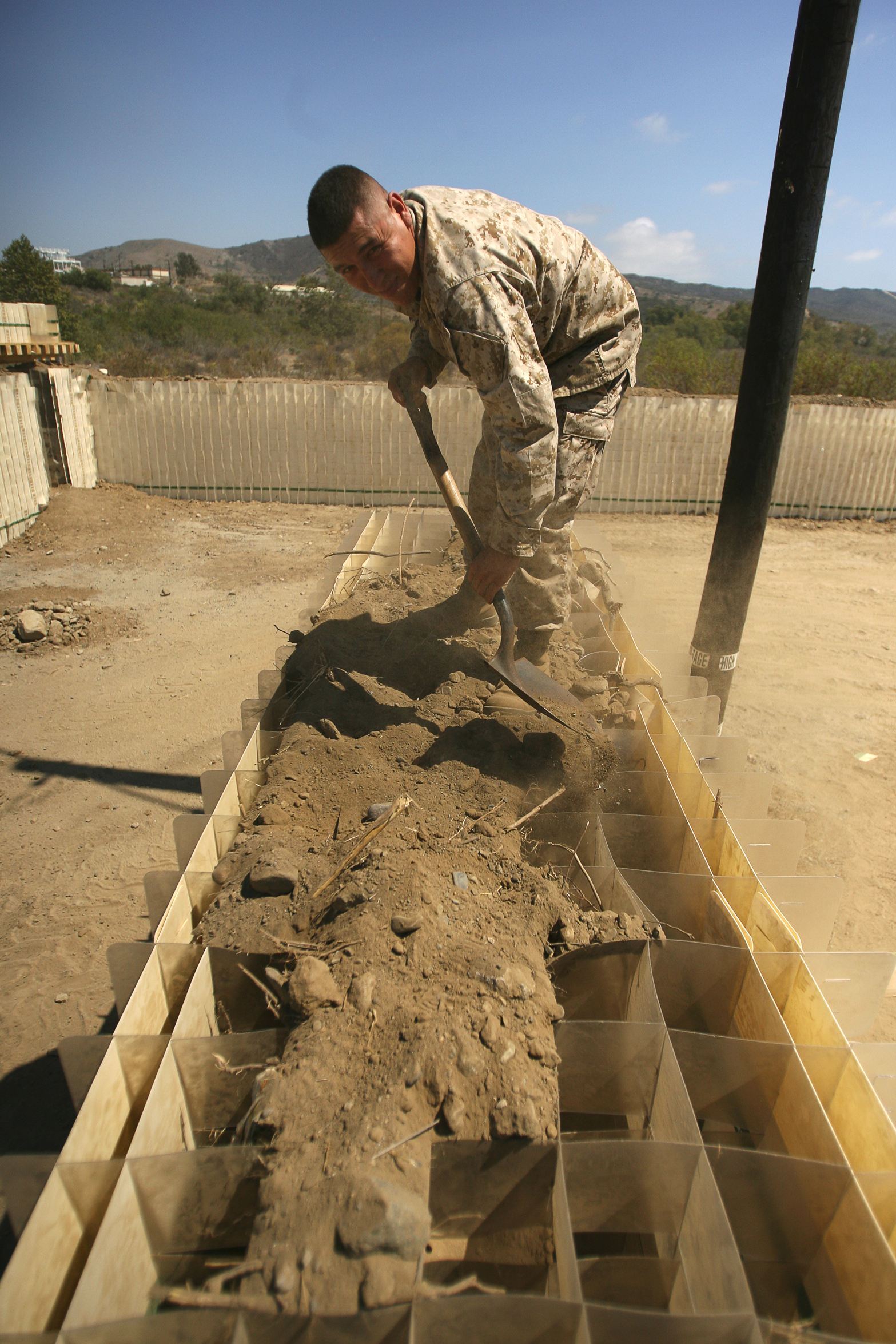
Filling a geocell envelope with earth to make a temporary barrier wall

Cellular confinement systems (CCS; also known as geocells) are widely used in construction for erosion control, soil stabilization on flat ground and steep slopes, channel protection, and structural reinforcement for load support and earth retention. Typical cellular confinement systems are geosynthetics made with ultrasonically welded high-density polyethylene (HDPE) strips or novel polymeric alloy (NPA)—and expanded on-site to form a honeycomb-like structure—and filled with sand, soil, rock, gravel or concrete.

== History of cellular confinement ==
Research and development of cellular confinement systems (CCS) began with the U.S. Army Corps of Engineers in 1975 to devise a method for building tactical roads over soft ground. Engineers found that sand-confinement systems performed better than conventional crushed stone sections and they could provide an expedient construction technique for access roads over soft ground, without being adversely affected by wet weather conditions. The US Army Corps of Engineers in Vicksburg, Mississippi (1981) experimented with a number of confining systems, from plastic pipe mats, to slotted aluminum sheets to prefabricated polymeric systems called sand grids and then, cellular confinement systems. Today cellular confinement systems are typically made from strips 50–200 mm wide, ultrasonically welded at intervals along their width. The CCS is folded and shipped to the job site in a collapsed configuration.

Efforts for civilian commercialization of the cellular confinement system by the Presto Products Company, led to the Geoweb®. This cellular confinement system was made from high density polyethylene (HDPE), relatively strong, lightweight and suitable for geosynthetic extruding manufacturing. The cellular confinement system was used for load support, slope erosion control and channel lining and earth retention applications in the United States and Canada in the early 1980s.

== Research ==
Early research found that cellular confinement reinforced gravel bases are "equivalent to about twice the thickness of unreinforced gravel bases" and that geocells performed better than single sheet reinforcement schemes (geotextiles and geogrids) and were more effective in reducing lateral spreading of infill under loading than conventional reinforced bases. However, Gregory N. Richardson (who was onsite at the US Corps of Engineers CCS Vicksburg facility) laments 25 years later on the "near absence of research papers on geocells in all of the geosynthetic national and international conferences."

A comprehensive literature review in 2008 concluded that the use of CCS technology in base reinforcement of paved roads, and railways in particular, was limited, due to the lack of design methods, lack of advanced research in the previous two decades and limited understanding of the reinforcement mechanisms. Since then, hundreds of research papers on geocell systems have been published. Extensive research has been conducted on CCS reinforcement for roadway applications to understand the mechanisms and influencing factors of confinement reinforcement, evaluate its effectiveness in improving roadway performance and develop design methods for roadway applications.

Comprehensive surveys and reviews—presented in 2017 and 2020—of latest geocell studies, field testing, state of the art knowledge and present trends and scope of future research directions, validated increased use of geocells in ground reinforcement and infrastructure projects. In 2013, J. Han et al. summarized comprehensive research conducted at the University of Kansas, including static and cyclic plate loading tests, full-scale moving wheel tests, and numerical modeling on geocell-reinforced base courses with different infill materials and discussed the main research findings from these studies regarding permanent, elastic, and creep deformations, stiffness, bearing capacity, and stress distribution, and the development of design methods for geocell-reinforced bases. These studies showed that base courses reinforced with Novel Polymeric Alloy (NAP) geocells reduced the vertical stresses at the interface between subgrade and base course, reduced permanent and creep deformations, increased elastic deformation, stiffness, and bearing capacity of base courses. Additional literature reviews were performed in 2013 by O. Kief et al. and A. Marto et al.

== Recent innovations in cellular confinement technology ==
The strength and stiffness of pavement layers determines the performance of highway pavements while aggregate use impacts the cost of duration of installation; therefore alternatives are needed to improve pavement quality using new materials with less aggregate usage. Geocells are recognized as a suitable geosynthetic reinforcement of granular soils to support static and moving wheel loads on roadways, railways and similar applications. But stiffness of the geocells was identified as a key influencing factor for geocell reinforcement, and hence the rigidity of the entire pavement structure.

Laboratory plate loading tests, full-scale moving wheel tests, and field demonstrations showed that the performance of geocell-reinforced bases depends on the elastic modulus of the geocell. Geocells with a higher elastic modulus had a higher bearing capacity and stiffness of the reinforced base. NPA Geocells showed higher results in ultimate bearing capacity, stiffness, and reinforcement relative to geocells made from HDPE. NPA geocells showed better creep resistance and better retention of stiffness and creep resistance particularly at elevated temperatures, verified by plate load testing, numerical modeling and full scale trafficking tests.

=== Application vs. long-term performance ===
CCS have been successfully installed in thousands of projects worldwide. However, it is incumbent to differentiate between low load applications, such as slope and channel applications, and new heavy-duty infrastructure applications, such as in the base layer of motorways, railways, ports, airports and platforms. For example, while all polymeric materials in CCS will creep over time under loading, the questions are; how much permanent degradation will occur, under which conditions, and its impact on long-term performance, and if this may lead to failure.

The lifespan of CCS in slope protection applications, for example, is less critical as vegetative growth and root interlock help stabilize the soil. This in effect compensates for any long-term loss of confinement in the CCS. Similarly, load support applications for low volume roads not subject to heavy loading typically have a short design life; therefore minor loss of performance is tolerable. However, in critical infrastructure applications such as reinforcement of the structural layers of highway pavements, railways and platforms, long-term dimensional stability is critical. As long as the volumetric area of the geocell does not change more than 2-3%, compaction and performance is maintained and settlements are minimized.

=== Development of standards for CCS ===
The latest milestone in the evolution of geocells is the development and publication of guideline standards. Recently published Standards for Geocells by the ASTM, ISO and other countries (e.g., the Netherlands), is the natural outcome of recent developments in the field of cellular confinement systems: new polymeric materials for geocells, extensive published research, accepted performance-based testing methods and an expanding knowledge base of field case studies. These are intended to disseminate the most updated knowledge about the best design methods and practices for implementing geocell technology in soil stabilization and road base reinforcement applications.

The new standards discuss relevant factors of reinforcement geosynthetics and confinement system applications, 3D reinforcement mechanisms, design factors, and emphasize the impact of geocell material attributes on long-term durability. Standard ASTM and ISO test methods for polymers commonly utilized by many industries are utilized to predict long-term behavior and accumulated plastic strain in a geosynthetic under loading with different mechanical stresses, frequencies and temperatures. For example, the Dutch standard for the Use of Reinforcement Geosynthetics in Roadways covers geocell (as well as geogrid) applications, support mechanisms, and design principles. It also emphasizes the importance of the geocell material attributes (stiffness and creep resistance) and how they influence long-term reinforcement factors.

The following are key points in the new standards:

- The extent of the stabilizing effect is determined by the material from which the geocell is made, in addition to its geometry.
- The retention of geometry is critical to geocell performance for the lifespan of the project. Volumetric change above 2% could result in loss of confinement, compaction, settlement, fatigue and/or failure.
- The key properties must maintain its elastic stiffness under dynamic loading, elastic properties without permanent deformation (creep), and tensile strength.

Common to the new Guidelines is a performance-based approach, in which engineering parameters, such as modulus, plastic deformation and tensile strength are key factors. Performance-based testing is critical, as heavy-duty infrastructure applications expose geocells to much higher dynamic stresses for longer lifespans.

== How it works ==
A Cellular Confinement System when infilled with compacted soil creates a new composite entity that possesses enhanced mechanical and geotechnical properties. When the soil contained within a CCS is subjected to pressure, as in the case of a load support application, it causes lateral stresses on perimeter cell walls. The 3D zone of confinement reduces the lateral movement of soil particles while vertical loading on the contained infill results in high lateral stress and resistance on the cell-soil interface. These increase the shear strength of the confined soil, which:

- Creates a stiff mattress or slab to distribute the load over a wider area
- Reduces punching of soft soil
- Increases shear resistance and bearing capacity
- Decreases deformation

Confinement from adjacent cells provides additional resistance against the loaded cell through passive resistance, while lateral expansion of the infill is restricted by high hoop strength. Compaction is maintained by the confinement, resulting in long-term reinforcement.

On site, the geocell sections are fastened together and placed directly on the subsoil's surface or on a geotextile filter placed on the subgrade surface and propped open in an accordion-like fashion with an external stretcher assembly. The sections expand to an area of several tens of meters and consist of hundreds of individual cells, depending on the section and cell size. They are then filled with various infill materials, such as soil, sand, aggregate or recycled materials and then compacted using vibratory compactors. Surface layers many be of asphalt or unbound gravel materials.

== Applications ==
=== Roadway load support ===
Cellular Confinement Systems (CCS) have been used to improve the performance of both paved and unpaved roads by reinforcing the soil in the subgrade-base interface or within the base course. The effective load distribution of CCS creates a strong, stiff cellular mattress. This 3D mattress reduces vertical differential settlement into soft subgrades, improves shear strength, and enhances load-bearing capacity, while reducing the amount of aggregate material required to extend the service life of roads. As a composite system, cellular confinement strengthens the aggregate infill, thereby simultaneously enabling the use of poorly graded inferior material (e.g. local native soils, quarry waste or recycled materials) for infill as well as reducing the structural support layer thickness. Typical load support applications include reinforcement of base and subbase layers in flexible pavements, including: asphalt pavements; unpaved access, service and haul roads; military roads, railway substructure and ballast confinement; working platforms in intermodal ports; airport runways and aprons, permeable pavements; pipeline support; green parking facilities and emergency access areas.

=== Steep soil slope and channel protection ===
The three-dimensional lateral confinement of CCS along with anchoring techniques ensures the long-term stability of slopes using vegetated topsoil, aggregate or concrete surfacing (if exposed to severe mechanical and hydraulic pressures). The enhanced drainage, frictional forces and cell-soil-plant interaction of CCS prevents downslope movement and limits the impact of raindrops, channelling and hydraulic shear stresses. The perforations in the 3D cells allow the passage of water, nutrients and soil organisms. This encourages plant growth and root interlock, which further stabilizes the slope and soil mass, and facilitates landscape rehabilitation. Typical applications include: construction cut and fill slopes and stabilization; road and rail embankments; pipeline stabilization and storage facility berms; quarry and mine site restoration; channel and coastline structures. They can be built as an underlying mass or as a facing.

=== Earth retention ===
CCS provide steep vertical mechanically stabilized earth structures (either gravity or reinforced walls) for steep faces, walls and irregular topography. Construction of CCS earth retention is simplified as each layer is structurally sound thereby providing access for equipment and workers, while eliminating the need for concrete formwork and curing. Local soil can be used for infill when suitable and granular, while the outer faces enable a green or tan fascia of the horizontal terraces/rows utilizing topsoil. Walls also can be used for lining channels and in cases of high flow, it is required that the outer cells contain concrete or cement slurry infill. CCS have been used to reinforce soft or uneven soil foundations for large area footings, for retaining wall strip footings, for load sharing of covers over pipelines and other geotechnical applications.

=== Reservoirs and landfills ===
CCS provides geomembrane liner protection, while creating stable soil, berms and slopes, for non-slip protection and durable impoundment of liquids and waste. Infill treatment depends on the contained materials: concrete for ponds and reservoirs; gravel for landfill drainage and leachates, vegetated infill for landscape rehabilitation. Concrete work is efficient and controlled as CCS functions as ready-made forms; CCS with concrete forms a flexible slab that accommodates minor subgrade movement and prevents cracking. In medium and low flow-velocities, CCS with geomembranes and gravel cover can be used to create impermeable channels, thereby eliminating the need for concrete.

== Sustainable construction ==
CCS is a green construction solution that makes civil infrastructure projects more sustainable. In load support applications, the increased geocell reinforcement enables a reduction in the amount and quality of infill for structural support. This means that locally available, but of marginal soil type or recycled materials can be used for construction. This reduces the need for quarry aggregate, thereby reducing quarrying, hauling and earthmoving placement equipment. This in turn decreases fuel use, pollution and the carbon footprint significantly, while at the same time lowering the construction environmental footprint in terms of less dust, erosion and runoff. When used for slope applications, perforated CCS provides excellent soil protection, water drainage and growth stratum for plants for the restoration of green and vegetated landscapes. Long-term design life of advanced CCS technology can also reduce maintenance and long-term economic costs.

== See also ==
- Avalanche control
- Gabion, a historic precursor for both erosion control and defense
- Mass wasting
- Rockfall
- Washboarding. Cellular confinement acts as a solution to this common problem.
