= Bioreactor landfill =

Dump with fast microbial decomposition

Bioreactor landfills are a more sustainable alternative to traditional landfills. Where traditional landfills face long aftercare periods and associated costs due to long-term potential for environmental contamination, bioreactor landfills aim to stimulate breakdown of the waste within the landfill. Costs associated with management of leachate treatment and liner replacement are thereby significantly reduced while gas production (methane) is significantly enhanced to stimulate energy generation and amount of land required for landfills is reduced. Waste breakdown is stimulated either through leachate recirculation or aeration.

== Traditional landfills and associated problems ==
Landfills are the oldest known method of waste disposal. Modern sanitary landfills are typically large dug-out or natural pits surrounded by impermeable artificial liners, filled with waste and subsequently covered to prevent environmental emissions. Bacteria and archaea decompose the waste over several decades, producing harmful by-products including greenhouse gases (notably methane), leachate rich in contaminants and particularly ammonium, and volatile organic compounds (VOCs) such as hydrogen sulfide (H_{2}S) which are associated with causing smog and acid rain.

The placement of liners in sanitary landfills prevent environmental pollution. Build-up of methane can lead to explosive conditions, and hence gas is captured and flared or, when gas is of sufficient quality, used for energy generation. Leachate build-up can reduce the structural stability of the landfill and ultimately enter the groundwater and pollute the environment. Hence, leachate is captured and treated at sewage treatment plants. Yet the created anaerobic conditions in the landfill means the “aftercare” period, where the landfill poses a significant environmental threat and thus monitoring and treatment are required, lasts a substantial amount of time and for certain countries, e.g. the Netherlands, is legally considered eternal. Costs of aftercare, such as replacement of liners and treatment of leachate shift to future generations and have an estimated cost of up to 20 million euros per landfill. Additionally, with an increasing amount of waste generation, appropriate places to safely store waste have become difficult to find.

== Working of a bioreactor landfill ==
Bioreactor landfills are operated in three modes: aerobic, anaerobic and a hybrid (combining the aerobic and anaerobic method). All three modes aim to stimulate microbial activity, enhancing decomposition while attempting to minimise harmful emissions. Contaminants are flushed out during the treatment period, rapidly degraded, or retained within the landfill.

In aerobic bioreactors atmospheric air is introduced into the landfill using either vertical or horizontal system of pipes. Aeration is either passive, where air passively moves into the landfill through the pipes, or active, where energy is used to either actively pump in air or extract landfill gas and introduce air based on overpressure. The created aerobic environment strongly accelerates waste decomposition, which is more efficient in the presence of oxygen. Thanks to the aerobic conditions the amount of VOCs, generation of methane, and toxicity of leachate are minimised. Organic contaminants are degraded, inorganic contaminants are removed at a rapid pace during the aeration period, and ammonium is allowed to be transformed to nitrate through nitrification in aerated pockets, followed by the transformation to nitrogen gas through denitrification in anaerobic pockets.

In anaerobic bioreactors treated leachate is recirculated to optimize landfill moisture levels, recirculate microbes through the landfill body, and flush previously unreachable sections of the landfill. The stimulated decomposition produces methane at a rate much faster and earlier than traditional landfills, which allows it to be used more efficiently for commercial purposes while reducing the time that the landfill needs to be monitored for methane production. Ammonium remains a contaminant of primary concern for anaerobic bioreactors, as the nitrification process cannot take place. Furthermore, recirculation efficiency can be low because of the existence of impermeable layers and preferential flow paths in landfills.

Hybrid bioreactors subject the landfill through aerobic-anaerobic cycles to combine the increased decomposition rate and ammonium removal of aerobic reactors with the optimal moisture content and flushing capabilities of anaerobic landfills.

== Advantages of bioreactor landfills ==
The main goal of bioreactor landfills is an accelerated decomposition. As decomposition progresses, the mass of biodegradable components in the landfill declines, creating more space for dumping waste, up to an expected increase of 30%. With an increasing global waste production, bioreactor landfills can thus provide a significant way of maximizing landfill space.

The operation as a bioreactor landfill furthermore decreases the aftercare period where landfills need te be monitored to an estimated less than a decade, down from several decades to eternity for traditional sanitary landfills. Contaminants are removed from rather than retained in the landfill. Bioreactor landfills are thereby significantly more cost-effective, do not shift costs to future generations, and allow landfills to be used for other purposes such as reforestation or parks at an earlier date.

== Disadvantages of bioreactor landfills ==
Bioreactor landfills are a relatively new technology, hence initial monitoring costs are higher to ensure that everything important is discovered and properly controlled. This includes gases, odours and seepage of leachate into the ground surface.

The increased moisture content of bioreactor landfill may reduce the structural stability of the landfill by increasing the pore water pressure within the waste mass.

Since the target of bioreactor landfills is to maintain a high moisture content, gas collection systems can be affected by the increased moisture content of the waste.

== Implementation of bioreactor landfills ==
Bioreactor landfills are a novel technology and most studies are on a laboratory scale in landfill simulation reactors. Translation to real life situations is difficult due to the relatively perfect conditions of landfill simulation reactors contrary to the complex and heterogeneous nature of landfills. Pilot projects on landfill scale are showing promise and more are being experimented with in different parts of the world. Despite the potential benefits of bioreactor landfills there are no standardised and approved designs with guidelines and operational procedures. Following is a list of bioreactor landfill projects which are being used to collect data for forming these needed guidelines and procedures:

=== United States ===
- California
  - Yolo County
- Florida
  - Alachua County Southeast Landfill
  - Highlands County
  - New River Regional Landfill, Raiford
  - Polk County Landfill, Winter Haven
- Kentucky
  - Outer Loop Landfill
- Michigan
  - Saint Clair County
- Mississippi
  - Plantation Oaks Bioreactor Demonstration Project, Sibley
- Missouri
  - Columbia
- New Jersey
  - ACUA's Haneman Environmental Park, Egg Harbor Township
- North Carolina
  - Buncombe County Landfill Project
- Virginia
  - Maplewood Landfill and King George County Landfills
  - Virginia Landfill Project XL Demonstration Project

=== Canada ===
- Sainte-Sophie Bioreactor demonstration Project, Quebec

=== Australia ===
- New South Wales
  - WoodLawn, Goulburn
- Queensland
  - Ti Tree Bioenergy, Ipswich

=== Netherlands ===
- Project introduction sustainable landfill management, including three landfills
  - The Kragge landfill (leachate recirculated)
  - Braambergen landfill (aerated)
  - Wieringermeer landfill (aerated)
- Landgraaf

=== Austria ===
- Heferlbach landfill (aerated)
- Vienna (aerated)

== See also ==
- Daily cover
- Landfill liner
- Landfill mining
