= LFMR =

LFMR may refer to:

- Landfill Mining and Reclamation
- Low field magnetoresistance
- The ICAO code for Barcelonnette – Saint-Pons Airport in France.
