= Landfills in the United States =

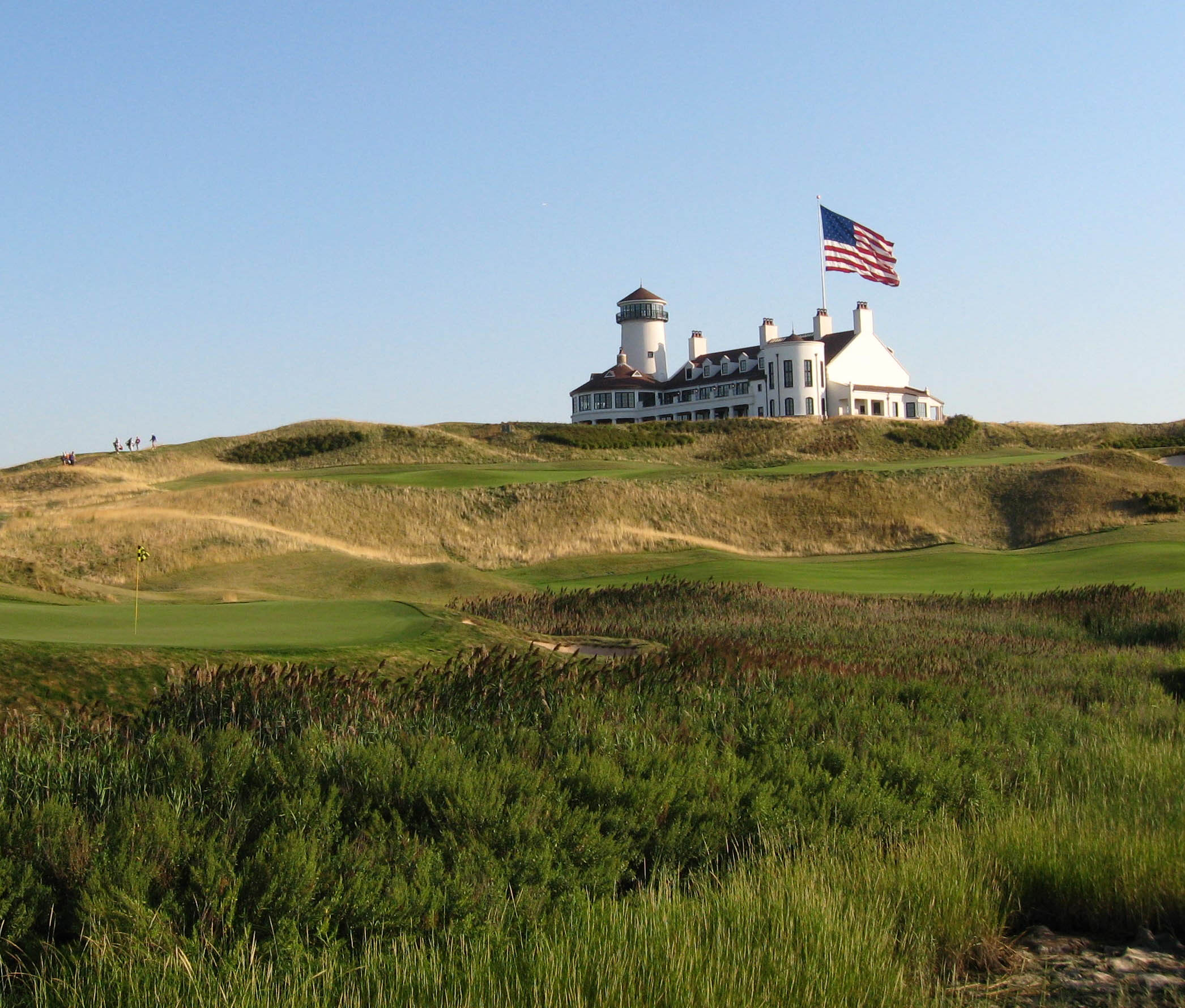
Former city landfill in New Jersey, now golf course

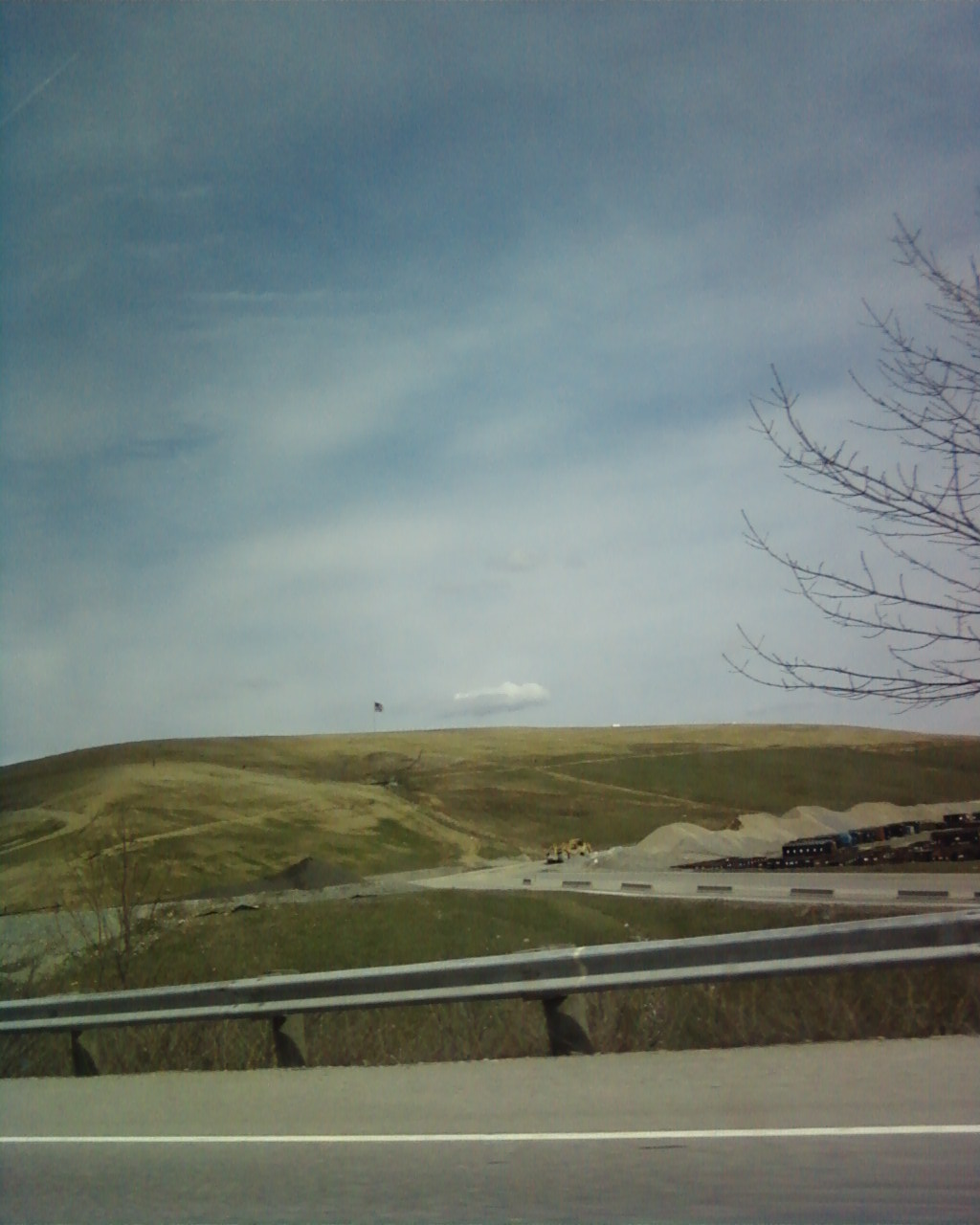
Mount Rumpke, one of the largest landfills in the United States, located north of Cincinnati, Ohio

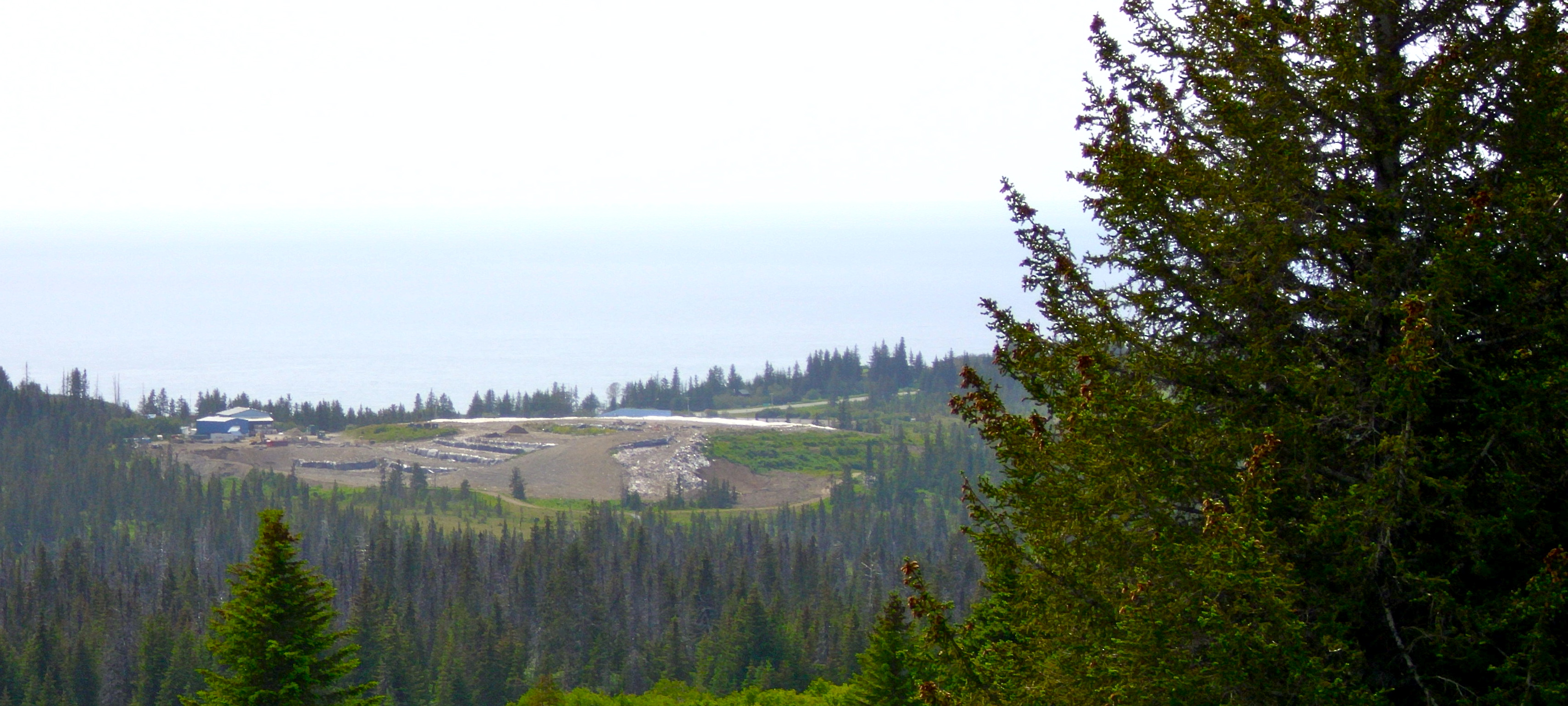
A small local landfill facility in Homer, Alaska

Municipal solid waste (MSW) – more commonly known as trash or garbage – consists of everyday items people use and then throw away, such as product packaging, grass clippings, furniture, clothing, bottles, food scraps and papers. In 2018, Americans generated about 265.3 million tonnes of waste. In the United States, landfills are regulated by the Environmental Protection Agency (EPA) and the states' environmental agencies. Municipal solid waste landfills (MSWLF) are required to be designed to protect the environment from contaminants that may be present in the solid waste stream.

Some materials may be banned from disposal in municipal solid waste landfills including common household items such as paints, cleaners/chemicals, motor oil, batteries, pesticides, and electronics. These products, if mishandled, can be dangerous to health and the environment: landfill leachate can contaminate water bodies and groundwater, and landfill gas contributes to air pollution and greenhouse gas emissions. Safe management of solid waste through guidance, technical assistance, regulations, permitting, environmental monitoring, compliance evaluation and enforcement is the goal of the EPA and state environmental agencies.

== History ==
The Fresno Municipal Sanitary Landfill, opened in Fresno, California in 1937, was the first modern, sanitary landfill in the United States, innovating the techniques of trenching, compacting, and the daily covering of waste with soil. It has been designated a National Historic Landmark, underlining the significance of waste disposal in urban society.

The first federal legislation addressing solid waste management was the Solid Waste Disposal Act of 1965 (SWDA) that created a national office of solid waste. By the mid-1970s, all states had some type of solid waste management regulations. In 1976, the U.S. House of Representatives passed the Resource Conservation and Recovery Act (RCRA) that dramatically expanded the federal government's role in managing waste disposal. RCRA divided wastes into hazardous and non-hazardous categories, and directed the EPA to develop the design and operational standards for sanitary landfills and close or upgrade existing open dumps that did not meet the sanitary landfill standards.

In 1979, the EPA developed criteria for sanitary landfills that included siting restrictions in floodplains; endangered species protection; surface water protection; groundwater protection; disease and vector (rodents, birds, insects) control; opening burning prohibitions; explosive gas (methane) control; fire prevention through the use of cover materials; and prevention of bird hazards to aircraft.

The RCRA was amended in 1984. In 1991, the EPA established new federal standards for municipal solid waste landfills that updated location and operation standards, added design standards, groundwater monitoring requirements, corrective action requirements for known environmental releases, closure and post-closure requirements, and financial assurances to pay for landfill future care and maintenance.

== Regulation ==
The EPA generally relies on the states to enforce their own operating permits and federal laws. If state agencies are not aggressive, violations can worsen, multiplying negative environmental impacts exponentially. There are some notably recorded violations in the U.S. such as for a landfill in Hawaii that was fined $2.8 million in 2006 for operating violations, but this is not common.

Modern landfills are specifically designed to protect human health and the environment by controlling water and air emissions. All MSWLF must comply with the federal regulations in 40 CFR Part 258, or equivalent state regulations. Some of the federal regulations in 40 CFR part 258 include:

- Location Restrictions - landfills must be built in suitable geological areas away from faults, wetlands, flood plains or other restricted areas.
- Composite Liners Requirements - include a flexible membrane (geomembrane) overlaying two feet of compacted clay soil lining the bottom and sides of the landfill, protect groundwater and the underlying soil from leachate releases.
- Leachate Collection and Removal Systems - sit on top of the composite liner and removes leachate from the landfill for treatment and disposal.
- Operating Practices - including the compacting and covering of waste frequently with several inches of soil to help reduce odor; control litter, insects and rodents; and protect public health.
- Groundwater Monitoring Requirements - testing of groundwater wells must be done to determine whether waste materials have escaped from the landfill.
- Closure and Postclosure Care Requirements - including covering landfills and providing long-term care of closed landfills.
- Corrective Action Provisions - control and cleanup of landfill releases and achieves groundwater protection standards.
- Financial Assurance - provides funding for environmental protection during and after landfill closure.

Under Subtitle D of RCRA, states are required to adopt and implement permit programs to ensure that landfills in their states comply with relevant federal standards. The law also requires EPA to determine whether state permit programs are adequate to ensure such compliance. For permit programs to be approved, states must provide opportunities for public involvement during the permit application process. This may include public meetings or submission of concerns in writing to the permitting agency. In addition, states must have the power to issue permits and perform compliance monitoring and enforcement actions that ensure compliance with the federal standards.

Agencies such as the Solid Waste Association of North America's (SWANA) Landfill Management Division provide training and technical advice related to the planning, design, construction, closure and post-closure of today's landfills. The division regularly monitors, reviews and comments on current legislative and regulatory actions that could potentially affect landfill operations and new technology. Waste Management, based in Houston, Texas, manages/operates five of the top 10 largest landfills and owns three of those outright. [Forbes]

=== Leachate collection ===
Landfill leachate is generated from liquids existing in the waste as it enters a landfill or from rainwater that passes through the waste within the facility. The leachate consists of different organic and inorganic compounds that may be either dissolved or suspended. An important part of maintaining a landfill is managing the leachate through proper treatment methods designed to prevent pollution into surrounding ground and surface waters. For landfills receiving hazardous waste, permits require landfill liners and the installation of systems for collecting leachate. Based on recent EPA studies, a liner and leachate collection system constructed to current standards typically has a liquid removal efficiency of 99 to 100 percent and frequently exceeds 99.99 percent.

The leachate collection system collects the leachate so that it can be removed from the landfill and properly treated or disposed. Most leachate collection systems have the following components:

- Leachate collection layer - a layer of sand or gravel or a thick plastic mesh called a geonet collects leachate and allows it to drain by gravity to the leachate collection pipe system.
- Filter Geotextile - a geotextile fabric, similar in appearance to felt, may be located at the top of the leachate collection pipe system to provide separation of solid particles from liquid. This prevents clogging of the pipe system.
- Leachate Collection Pipe System - Perforated pipes, surrounded by a bed of gravel, transport collected leachate to specially designed low points called sumps. Pumps, located within the sumps, automatically remove the leachate from the landfill and transport it to the leachate management facilities for treatment or another proper method of disposal.

Federal requirements mandate that treatment must meet drinking water quality standards, which are set to prevent harm to public health, or more stringent state standards to protect sensitive environments (high quality streams, trout streams).

=== Groundwater monitoring ===
Nearly all municipal solid waste landfills (MSWLFs) are required to monitor the underlying groundwater for contamination during their active life and post-closure care period. The exceptions to this requirement are small landfills that receive less than 20 tons of solid waste per day, and facilities that can demonstrate that there is no potential for the migration of hazardous constituents from the unit into the groundwater. All other MSWLFs must comply with the groundwater monitoring requirements found at 40 CFR Part 258, Subpart E–Ground-Water Monitoring and Corrective Action.

The groundwater monitoring system consists of a series of wells placed upgradient and downgradient of the MSWLF. The samples from the upgradient wells shows the background concentrations of constituents in the groundwater while, the downgradient wells show the extent of groundwater contamination caused by the MSWLF. The required number of wells, spacing, and depth of wells is determined on a site-specific basis based on the aquifer thickness, groundwater flow rate and direction, and the other geologic and hydrogeologic characteristics of the site. All groundwater monitoring systems must be certified by a qualified groundwater scientist and must comply with the sampling and analytical procedures outlined in the regulations.

There are three phases of groundwater monitoring requirements:

- Detection Monitoring - monitoring for the 62 constituents listed in Appendix I of 40 CFR Part 258 and sampling that occurs at least semiannually throughout the landfill's active life and post-closure period. If any of the constituents is detected at a higher level than the established background level, state regulatory agencies must be notified and an assessment monitoring program begun.
- Assessment monitoring - within 90 days of detection of an increase in constituents, a MSWLF must begin an assessment monitoring program. Samples must be taken from all wells and analyzed for the presence of all 214 constituents listed in Appendix II of 40 CFR Part 258. If any of the constituents are detected, background levels for these constituents and establish a groundwater protection standard (GWPS) for each. Within 90 days of establishing the background levels and GWPS, resamples for all constituents in Appendix I and Appendix II. Resampling must then be completed at least semiannually. Provided that levels remain within specified limits after two sampling events, the facility may return to the detection monitoring phase. If levels remain higher than standard, the owners/operators of the MSWLF must characterize the nature of the release, determine if contamination has migrated beyond the facility boundary, and begin assessing corrective measures.
- Corrective measures - must be protective of human health and the environment, meet the GWPS, control the source(s) of the release to prevent further releases, and manage any solid waste generated in accordance with all applicable RCRA regulations. Remedial actions must continue until three years of consecutive compliance are met.

=== Landfill gas utilization ===
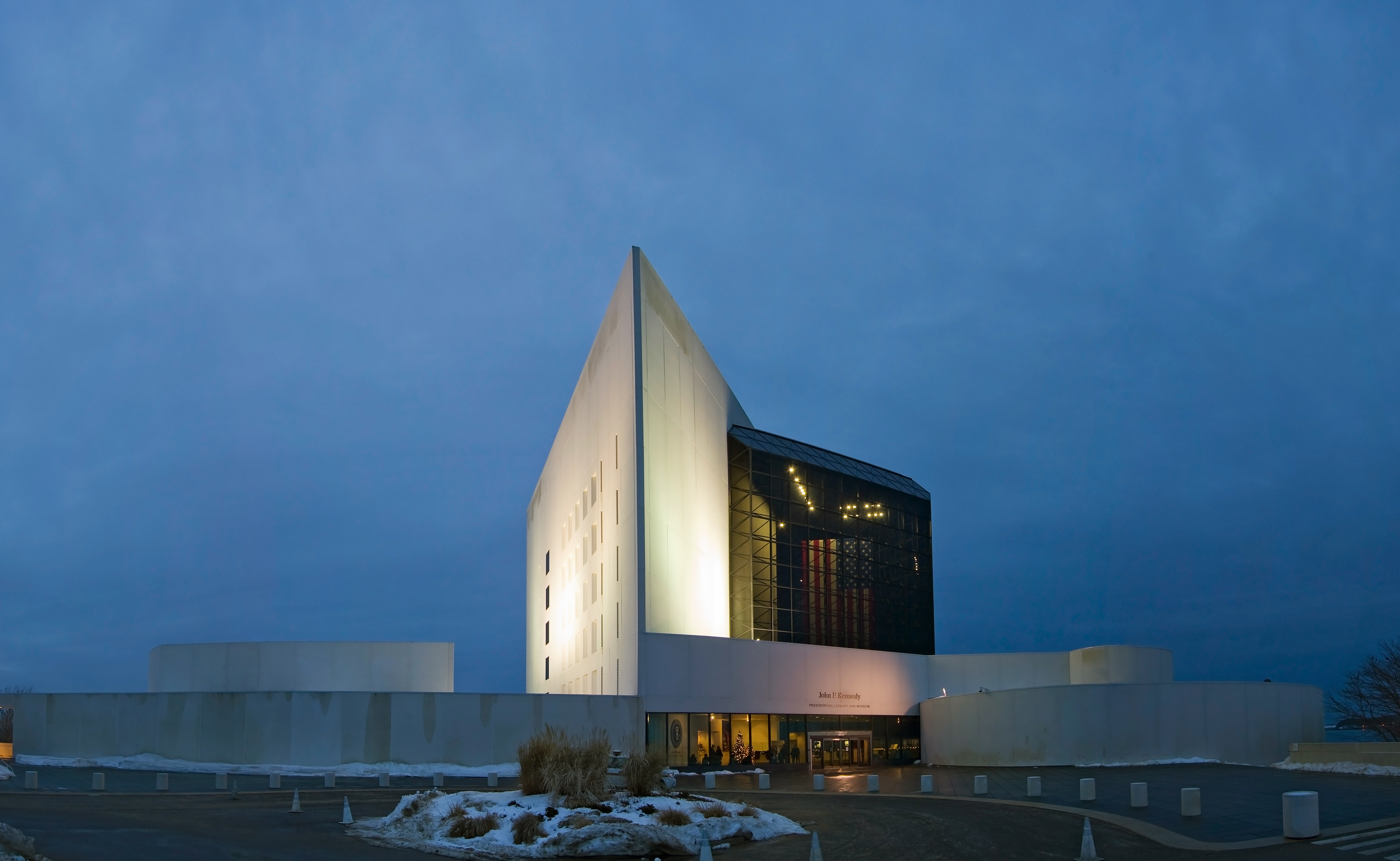
JFK Presidential Library and Museum - category 3 landfill post-closure site

A United States Environmental Protection Agency (EPA) report indicates that as of 2016, counts of operational municipal solid waste landfills range between 1,900 and 2,000. In a nationwide study done by the Environmental Research and Education Foundation in 2013, only 1,540 operational municipal solid waste landfills were counted throughout the United States. Decomposing waste in these landfills produces landfill gas, which is a mixture of about half methane and half carbon dioxide. Landfills are the third-largest source of methane emissions in the United States, with municipal solid waste landfills representing 95 percent of this fraction.

In the U.S., the number of landfill gas projects increased from 399 in 2005, to 594 in 2012 according to the Environmental Protection Agency. These projects are popular because they control energy costs and reduce greenhouse gas emissions. These projects collect the methane gas and treat it, so it can be used for electricity or upgraded to pipeline-grade gas. (Methane gas has twenty-one times the global warming potential of carbon dioxide). For example, in the U.S., Waste Management uses landfill gas as an energy source at 110 landfill gas-to-energy facilities. This energy production offsets almost two million tons of coal per year, creating energy equivalent to that needed by four hundred thousand homes. These projects also reduce greenhouse gas emissions into the atmosphere.

The EPA, which estimates that hundreds of landfills could support gas to energy projects, has also established the Landfill Methane Outreach Program. This program was developed to reduce methane emissions from landfills in a cost-effective manner by encouraging the development of environmentally and economically beneficial landfill gas-to-energy projects.

=== Post-closure and reclamation ===
In the U.S., the regulatory structure for landfills specifies a 30-year post-closure monitoring period. It is presumed that at the end of the 30-year period, the landfill will be stable and will no longer require intensive monitoring. Today, landfills are designed from the start to ensure protection of the environment and public health, and the safe and productive use of the site after closure.

There are three categories of post-closure uses of landfill sites: Category 1 - open space, agricultural and passive recreation; Category 2 - Active recreation, parking or industrial/commercial activities; and Category 3 - Intensive uses such as residences, industry and commercial development.

Category 1 post-closures are the most numerous and may be the least recognizable due to the fact they appear to be nothing more than an open field. Some examples include: Westview Sanitary Landfill in Georgia - now a cemetery and Griffith Park in California - used for hiking trails.

Category 2 post-closures may have utilities, light structures or paving. Examples include Settler's Hill Landfill in Illinois - now golf courses and a minor league baseball field or the Germantown Sanitary Landfill in Wisconsin that is now a ski slope.

Category 3 post-closures are usually characterized by inclusion of major structures. Some of the most well known are Mile High Stadium in Colorado which is the football stadium for the Denver Broncos; Brickyard Shopping Center in Illinois; and Columbia Point in Massachusetts, home of the John F. Kennedy Presidential Library and Museum, and University of Massachusetts Boston's State Archives Building.

==== Habitat restoration ====
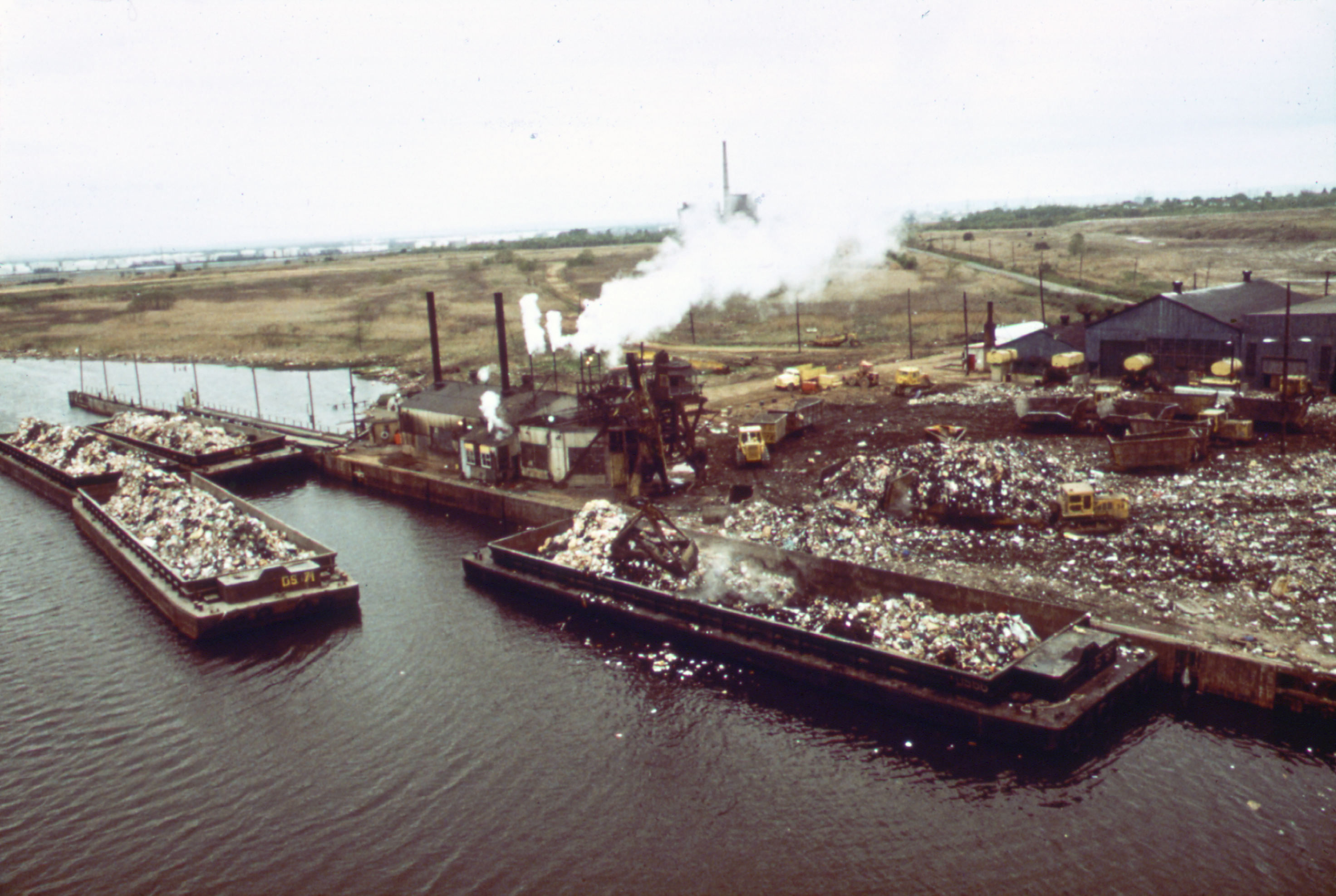
Waste being brought to the Fresh Kills landfill on Staten Island, NY before its closure in 2000.

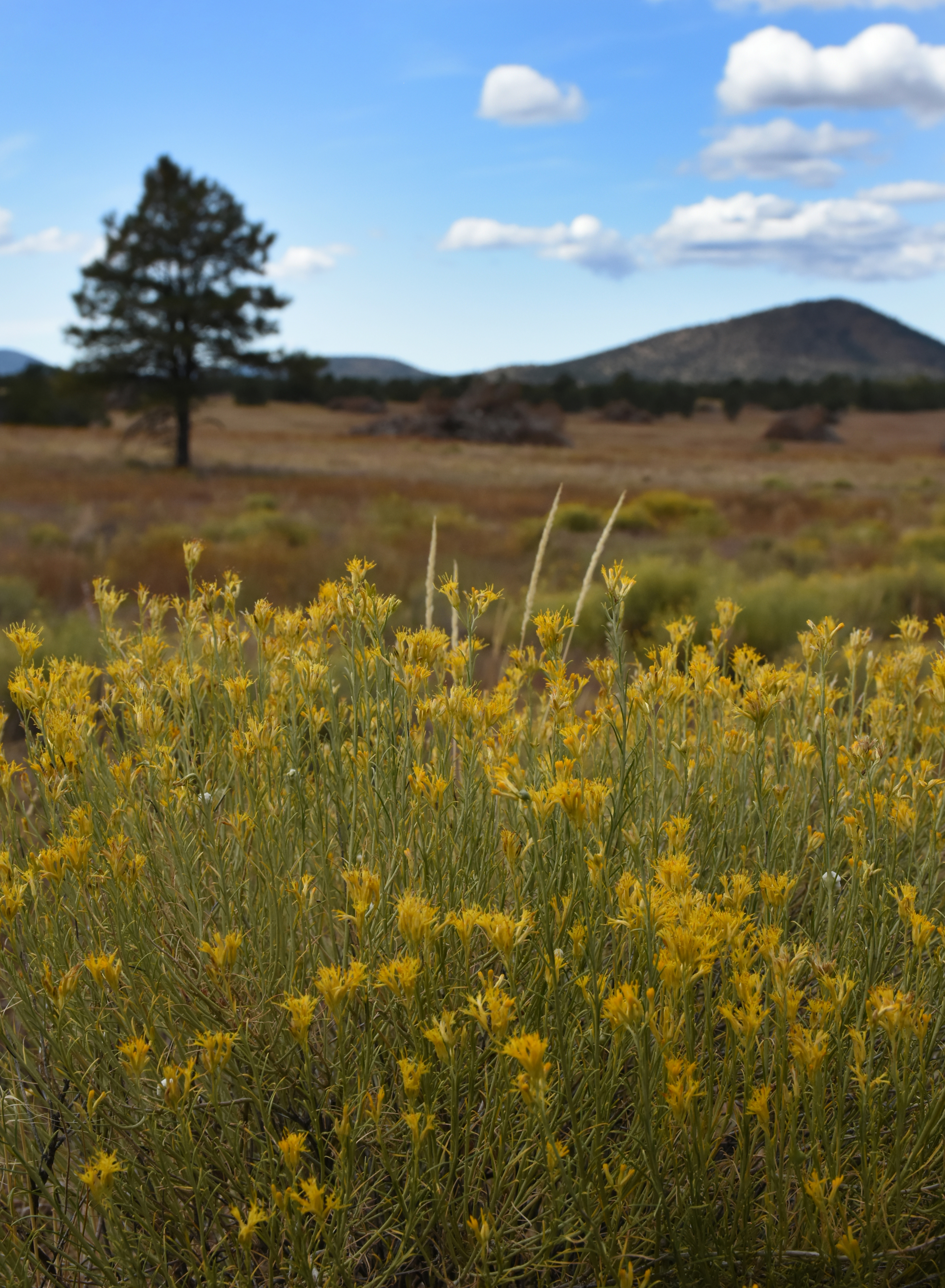
An example of the biodiversity of restored grasslands from Kaibab National Forest.

There is a movement among Category 1 closures to create more habitat restoration initiatives. Examples such as the Fresh Kills Landfill in Staten Island, New York, which closed in 2001, show how biodiversity can be fostered through replanting trees over landfills. Creating habitats using native species can be complicated by many environmental factors, but using experimental plantings can be beneficial to the beginning stages of restoration. The Fresh Kills Landfill is an example of an urban landfill restoration that turned parts of the world's largest landfill into an urban green space. These types of restorations are effective, however, as the U.S develops more and more land and destroys native habitats, efforts towards restoring grasslands are becoming more concentrated around the country. Despite changing environmental conditions due to climate change, habitat restorations of landfills have proven to be effective examples of biodiversity preservation. Closed landfills become ideal places for grassland restoration because their caps allow grasses to flourish on the flat, open field that was once the landfill. The Croton Point landfill in the Hudson Valley of New York State is an example of successful grasslands restoration and it is part of a pattern of closures in the Northeast with many more landfills set to close by 2050.

There are many ecosystem service benefits to these pockets of diverse grasslands. These restored grasslands can become havens for grassland birds looking for places to live among the landscape fragmented by human development. Pollinators, insects, birds, and other animals can foster new ecosystems that might be unique in their fragmentation and seed dispersal. One international study from the Czech Republic found that the number of species recorded in a closed landfill increased to a level rivaling the surrounding environments or greater. A mix of native species and new "invasive" species increased the overall diversity of plants in the area contributing more herbs and woody-stemmed species. At the landfill in the Czech Republic, the number of species increased from 94 to 195 in the 8 year study period.

== Statistics ==
The EPA has collected and reported data on the generation and disposal of waste in the United States for more than 30 years. Recent estimates state that the amount of municipal waste disposed of in US landfills per year is about 265 million tonnes (261,000,000 long tons; 292,000,000 short tons) as of 2013.

Organic materials are estimated to be the largest component of MSW. Paper and paperboard account for 29% and yard trimmings and food scraps account for another 27%; plastics 12%; metals 9%, rubber, leather and textiles 8%; wood is approximately 6.4% and glass 5%. Other miscellaneous wastes make up approximately 3.4%.

In 2010, Americans recovered almost 65 million tons of MSW (excluding composting) through recycling. Despite an increase in population, the total amount of solid waste disposed in landfills has decreased since 1990. And as of 2017, Americans only discarded 52% of their waste in landfills, as opposed to 89% in 1980.

In 2013, about 32.7 million tons of MSW were combusted for energy recovery.

Research has shown that leachate treatment facilities at modern landfills are capable of removing 100 percent of the trace organics and over 85 percent of the heavy metals.

The Puente Hills Landfill is the largest landfill in America. Over 150 m (490 ft) of garbage has risen from the ground since the area became a designated landfill site in 1957.

In 1986, there were 7,683 landfills in the United States. By 2009, there were just 1,908 landfills nationwide: a 75 percent decline in disposal facilities in less than 25 years. However, this number is deceptive. Much of the decrease is due to consolidation of multiple landfills into a single, more efficient facility. Also technology has allowed for each acre of landfill to take 30% more waste. So during this time, the available landfill per person has increased by almost 30%.

== See also ==
- Landfill gas
- Solar landfill — solar installation on filled landfills or brownfields
- Environment of the United States
- Environmental issues in the United States
