= Landfill mining =

Excavating and processing solid wastes from landfills

Landfill mining and reclamation (LFMR) is a process which excavates and processes solid wastes which have previously been landfilled. The process aims to reduce the amount of landfill mass encapsulated within the closed landfill or temporarily remove hazardous material to allow protective measures to be taken before the landfill mass is replaced. In the process, mining recovers valuable recyclable materials, a combustible fraction, soil, and landfill space. The aeration of the landfill soil is a secondary benefit with regard to the landfill's future use. The combustible fraction is useful for power generation. The overall appearance of the landfill mining procedure is a sequence of processing machines laid out in a functional conveyor system. The operating principle is to excavate, sieve, and sort the landfill material.

The Hiriya landfill operated by the Dan Region Authority next to the city of Tel Aviv, Israel, introduced the concept of mining as early as 1953.

Waste contains many resources with high value, the most notable of which are metals such as aluminium cans and scrap. The concentration of aluminium in many landfills is higher than the concentration of aluminum in bauxite from which the metal is derived.

== Practical applications ==
Landfill mining is also possible in countries where land is not available for new landfill sites. In this instance, landfill space can be reclaimed by the extraction of biodegradable waste and other substances, then refilled with wastes requiring disposal.

Mining construction landfill sites is the simplest form of landfill mining. Construction landfills in the United States contain three basic components: wood, scrap metal, and gypsum (drywall), along with a minimal amount of other construction materials. The wood collected can be used as fuel in coal- or biomass-burning power plants, and the scrap metal reprocessed. European landfills tend to have more masonry from demolished bricks, tiles, and concrete.

Mining of municipal landfills is more complicated and has to be based on the expected content of the landfill. Older landfills in the United States before 1994 were often capped and closed, essentially entombing the waste, which can be beneficial for waste recovery. However, it can also create a higher risk for toxic waste and leachate exposure, as the landfill has not fully processed the stewing wastes. Mining of bioreactor landfills and properly stabilized modern sanitary landfills provides its own benefits. The biodegradable wastes are more easily sieved out, leaving the non-biodegradable materials readily accessible. The quality of these materials for recycling and reprocessing purposes is not as high as initially recycled materials; however, materials such as aluminum and steel are usually excluded from this.

Landfill mining is most useful as a method to remediate hazardous landfills. Landfills that were established before landfill-liner technology was well-established often leak their unprocessed leachate into underlying aquifers. This is both an environmental hazard and a legal liability. In the US, the Environmental Protection Agency requires closed landfills to be monitored for at least 30 years after waste placement ceases. Mining the landfill to allow a safe liner to be laid is a last, but sometimes necessary, resort.

== Methods ==
The parts of the mining process are the different mining machines. Depending on the complexity of the process, more or fewer machines can be used. Machinery is easily transported on trucks from site to site, mounted on trailers.

An excavator or front-end loader uncovers the landfilled materials and places them on a conveyor belt to be taken to the sorting machinery. A trommel is used to separate materials by size. First, a large trommel separates materials like appliances and fabrics. A smaller trommel then allows the biodegraded soil fraction to pass through, leaving non-biodegradable, recyclable materials on the screen to be collected. An electromagnet is used to remove the ferrous material from the waste mass as it passes along the conveyor belt, and front-end loader is used to move sorted materials to trucks for further processing.

Odor-control sprayers are wheeled tractors with a cab and movable spray arm mounted on a rotating platform. A large reservoir tank mounted behind the cab holds neutralizing agents, usually in liquid form, to reduce the smell of exposed wastes.

Depending on the level of resource recovery, material can be put through an air classifier, which separates light organic material from heavy organic material. The separate streams are then loaded onto trucks either for further processing or for sale. Further manual processing can be done on-site if processing facilities are too far away to justify the transportation costs.

== See also ==
- Urban mining
- Biogas
- Chelation
- Daily cover
- Dump digging
- Landfill liner
- Landfill tax
- Mycoremediation
- Phytomining
- Waste picker
