= Rumpke Sanitary Landfill =

Waste landfill in Ohio

Coordinates: 39°16′22.08″N 84°35′51.50″W

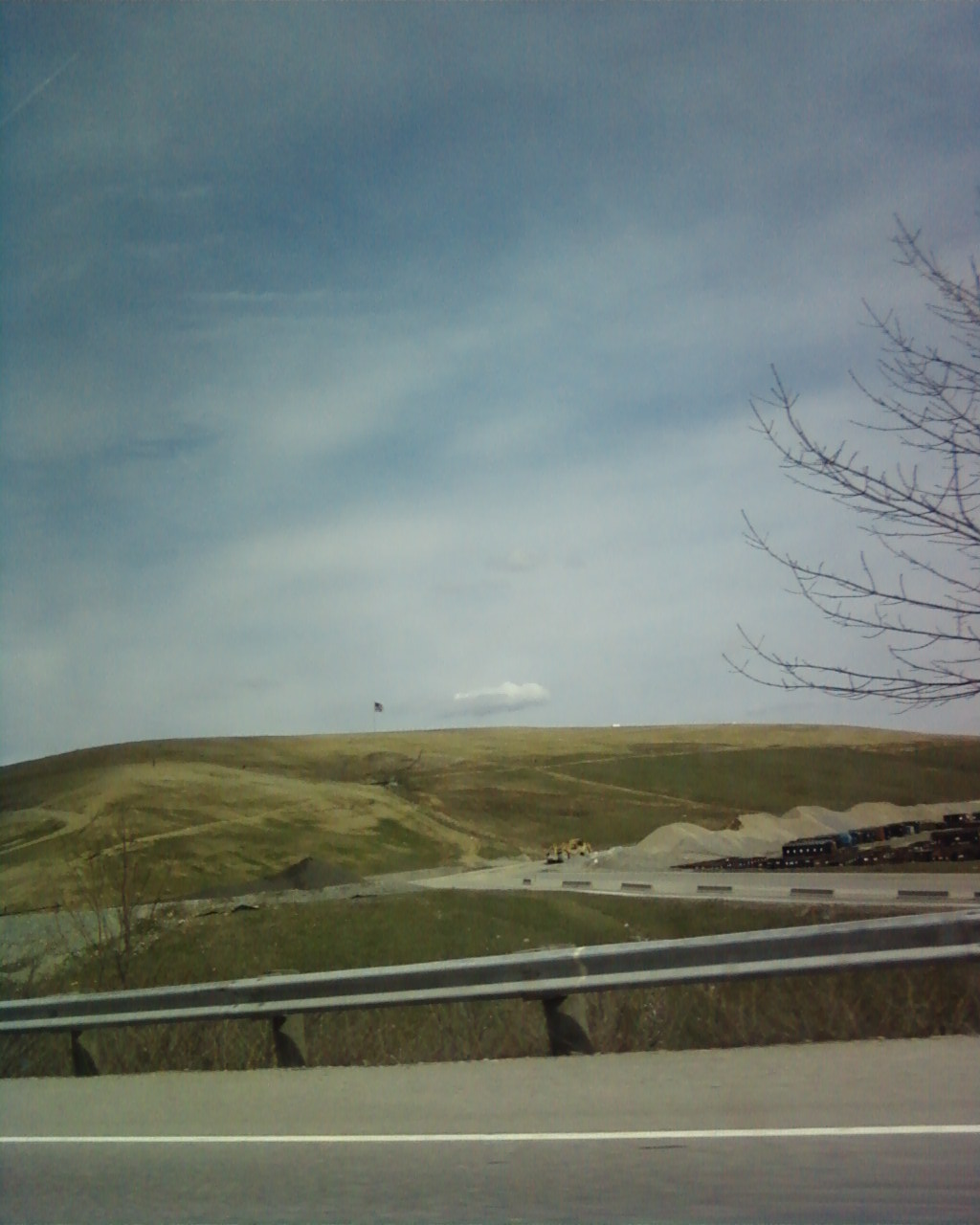
Mount Rumpke as seen from U.S. Route 27

Rumpke Sanitary Landfill, more colloquially known as Mount Rumpke or Rumpke Mountain, is one of the largest landfills in the United States located in Colerain Township, Hamilton County, north of Cincinnati, Ohio. It is owned by Rumpke Consolidated Companies, Inc. and occupies over 230 acres (93 ha) of a 440-acre (180 ha) tract of land that the company owns. The landfill receives 2 million tons (2×10^{6} kg) of household and industrial wastes annually.

Mount Rumpke is 1,075 feet (328 m) above sea level and the highest landform in Hamilton County, Ohio, clearly visible from U.S. Route 27. It is the largest landfill in the state of Ohio and the sixth largest in the United States.

== History ==
=== Company ===
In the 1930s, Barney and Bill Rumpke collected garbage from their neighbors without charge in the neighborhood of Carthage in Cincinnati. Most of the waste was food scraps, which they fed to their hogs on their hog farm. Eventually, officials told them that it was unsanitary, so they stopped feeding the garbage to the pigs although their neighbors wanted them to continue to remove their garbage. Therefore, they sold their hogs and charged money to take the garbage away, creating their trash business. The Rumpke Landfill was started in 1945 and has expanded today to occupy over 230 acres (0.93 km^{2}) of land. As of 2010, Rumpke may still be considered a family operation with over 70 employees being part of the family.

=== Landslide and fire ===
On March 9, 1996, a massive landslide occurred on the north side of the landfill. The north face of the mound cracked and fell forward, exposing 15 acres (6.1 ha) of buried waste. A few months after the landslide, on May 23, 1996, lightning struck near the location of the landslide, causing a fire that lasted for six days. The crack was filled in and Rumpke paid one million dollars as a fine. Attorney General Betty Montgomery called the incident "the largest trash landslide in Ohio history".

=== Expansion ===
In 2005, Rumpke was permitted to expand Rumpke Sanitary Landfill by 300 acres (120 ha), and it is expected to be below maximum capacity until 2022. Rumpke planned to nearly double the size of the landfill to produce a 785-acre landfill. Local zoning stymied this expansion, so Rumpke sued the township and obtained a ruling in 2010 that the dump was a public utility and therefore not subject to zoning. The township appealed to the Ohio State Supreme Court who, in September 2012, ruled in favor of the township. The decision states that Rumpke cannot proceed without approval of the Colerain Township Zoning Commission.

=== Elevated temperatures ===
On August 31, 2009, Rumpke reported elevated temperatures and poor gas quality at some of their methane recovery wells. This increased rate of oxidation has increased citizen complaints of odors in the area. Montauk Energy, Rumpke, Ohio EPA, U.S. EPA, Hamilton County Department of Environmental Services (HCDOES), Hamilton County Public Health (HCPH), and Colerain Township Fire have been involved in trying to resolve the issue.

=== Miscellany ===
A 14-year-old circus elephant, the world's largest Hershey's bar and a Super Bowl ring are some of the items buried in the landfill.

== Landfill gas recovery ==
Three methane gas recovery facilities, owned by Montauk Energy Capital, operate on the landfill. The first plant opened in 1986, then the second opened in 1995, and the third opened in 2007. These facilities convert the methane gas into natural gas. The plants can recover about 15 million cubic feet per day (420×10^{3} m^{3}/d) of landfill gas, making it the largest recovery operation of its kind in the world. Distributed by Duke Energy Corporation, the natural gas energy from the natural gas from the three facilities combined is enough to power 25,000 homes and businesses.

== Air monitoring ==
Hamilton County Department of Environmental Services (HCDOES), U.S. EPA, and Ohio EPA have been involved in monitoring the air onsite and surrounding the landfill for air pollutants. Levels of hydrogen sulfide, volatile organic compounds, carbon monoxide, and methane are included in the measurements.

== See also ==
- Landfills in the United States
