= Final cover =

System to reduce amount of storm water entering a closed landfill

Final cover is a multilayered system of various materials which are primarily used to reduce the amount of storm water that will enter a landfill after closing. Proper final cover systems will also minimize the surface water on the liner system, resist erosion due to wind or runoff, control the migrations of landfill gases, and improve aesthetics.

A final cover system can include a top soil layer composed of nutrient rich soil, a protective layer to reduce the effects of freeze/thaw, a drainage layer which moves storm water, a barrier layer, and a grading layer.

== Cover integrity ==
For a final cover system consisting of a geomembrane, an analysis of the mechanical properties of the geomembrane should be conducted to ensure cover integrity is not jeopardized by localized subsidence, bending, and cover slope stability.

=== Localized subsidence ===
Localized subsidence induces tensile stresses in geomembranes, which can threaten the final cover integrity. The magnitudes of the tensile stress can be viewed as a function of the dimensions of the subsidence zone and the properties of the cover soil. Allowable tensile stress of a geomembrane is usually known; in order to ensure the stability of final cover, the tensile stress allowable by a geomembrane should exceed the calculated value for tensile stress induced by waste.

=== Geomembrane bending ===
Geomembrane bending, both from its self-weight and soil cover may also induce tensile stress. Tensile stress from bending should not exceed the allowable tensile stress of the geomembrane.

=== Cover slope stability ===
Cover slope stability analysis involves evaluation of the interface strengths under static and seismic conditions. In order to perform an evaluation of the effects of a final cover system placed on a refuse side slope, slope stability analyses are required. A slope stability analysis assumes that the driving forces causing movement are due to the weight of the materials and the forces governing resistance are due to material strength. Most engineers design the permanent slope to have a minimum Factor of Safety of 1.5 at the designed inclination (typically 3H:1V) for static loading. Steepening of a slope past the design inclination increases the driving forces thus decreasing the Factor of Safety. Decreasing the Factor of Safety past 1.0 could possibly push the final cover system components beyond their limits of stability.

== See also ==
- Daily cover
- Landfill
