= Landfill liner =

Barriers used to delay pollution from decomposing trash

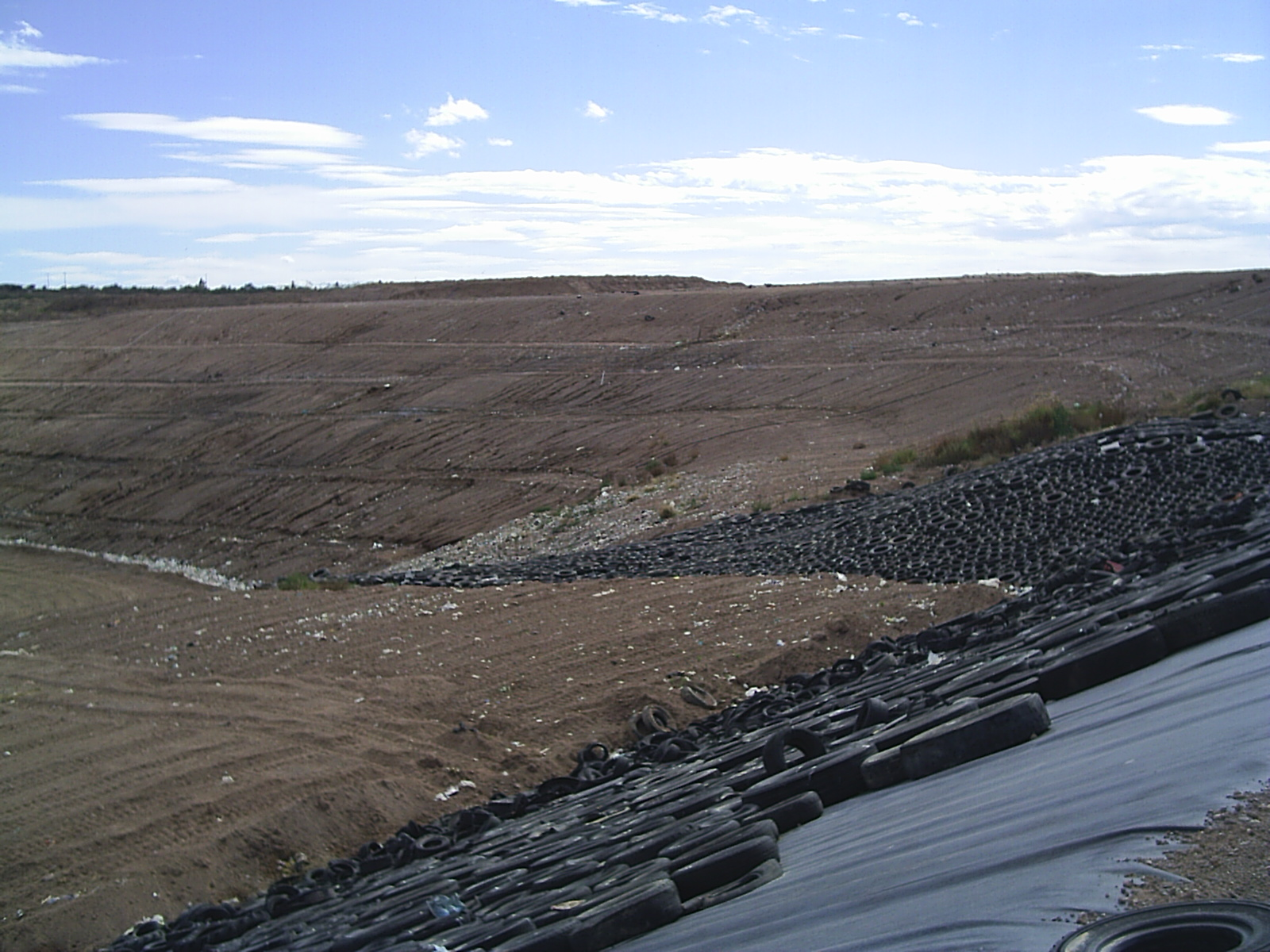
A landfill in México with visible geomembrane in one of the slopes

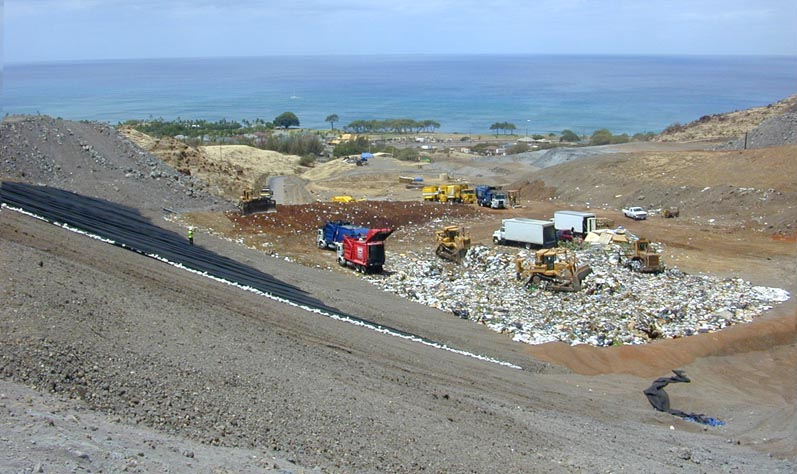
A landfill cell showing a rubberized liner in place (left)

A landfill liner, or composite liner, is intended to be a low permeable barrier, which is laid down under engineered landfill sites. Until it deteriorates, the liner retards migration of leachate, and its toxic constituents, into underlying aquifers or nearby rivers from causing potentially irreversible contamination of the local waterway and its sediments.

Modern landfills generally require a layer of compacted clay or a geosynthetic clay liner with a minimum required thickness and a maximum allowable hydraulic conductivity, overlaid by a geomembrane.

The United States Environmental Protection Agency has stated that the barriers "will ultimately fail," while sites remain threats for "thousands of years," suggesting that modern landfill designs delay but do not prevent ground and surface water pollution.

Chipped or waste tires are used to support and insulate the liner.

== Types ==
Different types of liquid trash will vary in their chemical properties and threat posed to the local environment, so any individual landfills may use a variety of different liner systems depending on the type of trash that is collected there. There are two main types of liner systems in use: single-liner systems, and double-liner systems.

Single-liner systems are generally used in landfills which hold rubble waste from construction. Landfills with single-liner systems are not designed to contain harmful liquid wastes such as paint or tar that could easily seep through a single-liner system.

Double-liner systems are usually found in municipal solid waste landfills, as well all hazardous waste landfills. The first layer is constructed to collect the leachate, while the second layer is engineered to be a leak-detection system to ensure that no contaminants seep into the ground.

== Components ==
Composite liners are required to be used in municipal solid waste systems for landfills and use a double liner system which is composed of a leachate system which is a liquid that collects solids from the substance this is passed through it. The leachate system is surrounded in a by a type of solid drainage layer such as gravel which is enclosed by a geomembrane and compressed clay, also known as a geosynthetic clay liner. This geosynthetic clay liner is usually made of sodium bentonite which is compacted in between two thick pieces of geotextile. The next material surrounding the composite liner would be a leak detection system composed of another material like gravel with an additional geomembrane or complex liner. The geomembranes within the composite liner consist of a high-density polyethylene which provide an effective minimization for flow and deliver and helpful barrier which is used on inorganic contaminants. It can be used as a substitute for sand or gravel and also has a very high transmissivity and low storage. The lower surface helps provide an effective leak test once correctly installed. It is also a low permeable vapor and liquid barrier. The geosynthetic clay liners are manufactured by factories and the purpose for it being made of sodium bentonite is that they regulate the movement of liquids in gases within the waste. The geocomposites which are a combination of the geomembranes and geosynthetic liner material also include a layer of bentonite between the middle of the layers of geotextile; however, airspace is allowed to be implemented. It is then topped off with a final cover.

== Mechanism ==
The main role a composite liner performs in a municipal solid waste system for landfills is reducing the amount of leakage through small seep holes that sometimes form in the geomembrane part of the composite liner. The protection layer part serves as a preventer from these holes from forming inside the geomembrane which would allow the waste to leak through the entire liner. It also takes away the pressure and stress which can cause cracking and holes from forming in the membrane as well. An effective liner in a landfill system should be able to control water in terms of movement and protection on the environment. It should be able to regulate the flow away from the waste area and withhold the waste contents as it enters the actual landfill. Due to the effectiveness on how landfills are placed on top of slopes in order for the water to stream downhill and in an emergency, into the actual landfill. Water moves through the landfill and downward through the composite liner. The main purpose for all of this is so that the movement is lateral which lessens the probability for slope catastrophe and the waste leaking down and freely contaminating whatever is in its path. The final cover functions as a way to keep the water out of the contaminate and to control the runoff from entering the system. This helps prevent plants and animals from being harmed by the waste contaminated water, leachate. Using gravity and pumps the leachate is able to be pushed to a sump where it is removed by a pump. When developing composite liners it is extremely important to take in risk factors such as earthquakes and other slope failure problems that could occur. Composite liners are used in municipal solid waste (MSW) landfills to reduce water pollution. A composite liner is made of a geomembrane along with a geosynthetic clay liner. Composite-liner systems are better at reducing leachate migration into the subsoil than either a clay liner or a single geomembrane layer.

== Mechanical properties ==
The primary forms of mechanical degradation associated with geomembranes result from insufficient tensile strength, tear resistance, impact resistance, puncture resistance, and susceptibility to environmental stress cracking (ESC). The ideal method of assessing the amount of liner degradation would be by examining field samples over their service life. Due to the lengths of time required for field sampling tests, various laboratory-accelerated ageing tests have been developed to measure the important mechanical properties.

=== Tensile strength ===
Tensile strength represents the ability for a geomembrane to resist tensile stress. Geomembranes are most commonly tested for tensile strength using one of three methods; the uniaxial tensile test described in ASTM D639-94, the wide-strip tensile test described in ASTM D4885-88, and the multiaxial tension test described in ASTM D5617-94. The difference in these three methods lies in the boundaries imposed into the test specimens. Uniaxial tests do not provide lateral restraint during testing and thus tests the sample under uniaxial stress conditions. During the wide-strip test the sample is restrained laterally while the middle portion is unrestrained. The multiaxial tensile test provides a plane stress boundary condition at the edges of the sample. A typical range of tensile strengths in the machine direction are from 225 to 245 lb/in for 60-mil HDPE to 280 to 325 lb/in for 80-mil HDPE.

=== Tear resistance ===
Tear resistance of a geomembrane becomes important when it is exposed to high winds or handling stress during installation. There are various ASTM methods for measuring tear resistance of geomembranes, with most common reports using ASTM D1004. Typical tear resistances show a value of 40 to 45 lb for 60-mil HDPE and 50 to 60 lb for 80-mil HDPE.

=== Impact resistance ===
Impact resistance provides an assessment of the effects of impacts from falling objects which can either tear or weaken the geomembrane. As with the previous mechanical properties, there are various ASTM methods for assessment. Significantly higher impact resistances are realized when geotextiles are placed above or below the geomembrane. Thicker geomembranes also display higher impact resistances.

=== Puncture resistance ===
Puncture resistance of a geomembrane is important due to the heterogeneous material above and below a typical liner. Rough surfaces, such as stones or other sharp objects, may puncture a membrane if it does not have sufficient puncture resistance. Various methods beyond standard ASTM tests are available; one such method, the critical cone height test, measures the maximum height of a cone on which a compressed geomembrane, which is subjected to increasing pressure, does not fail. HDPE samples typically have a critical cone height of around 1 cm.

=== Environmental stress cracking ===
Environmental stress cracking is defined as external or internal cracking in plastic induced by applied tensile stress more than its short-term tensile strength. ESC is a fairly common observation in HDPE geomembranes and thus needs to be evaluated carefully. Proper polymeric properties, such as molecular weight, orientation, and distribution, aid in ESC resistance. ASTM D5397 [standard test method for evaluation of stress crack resistance of polyolefin geomembranes using notched constant tensile load (NCTL)] provides the necessary procedure for measuring the ESC resistance of most HDPE geomembranes. The current recommended transition time for an acceptable HDPE geomembrane is around 100 h.

== See also ==
- Geomembrane / Pond liner
- Bioclogging
- Biogas
- Daily cover
- Landfill mining
- Landfills in the United States
- Waste compaction
