= Urban mining =

Stockpile of rare metals in discarded equipment

An urban mine is the stockpile of rare metals in the discarded electronic waste of a society. Urban mining is the process of recovering these rare metals through mechanical and chemical treatments. In 1997, recycled gold accounted for approximately 20% of the 2700 tons of gold supplied to the market.

The name was coined in the 1980s by Professor Hideo Nanjyo of the Research Institute of Mineral Dressing and Metallurgy at Tohoku University and the idea has gained significant traction in Japan (and in other parts of Asia) in the 21st century.

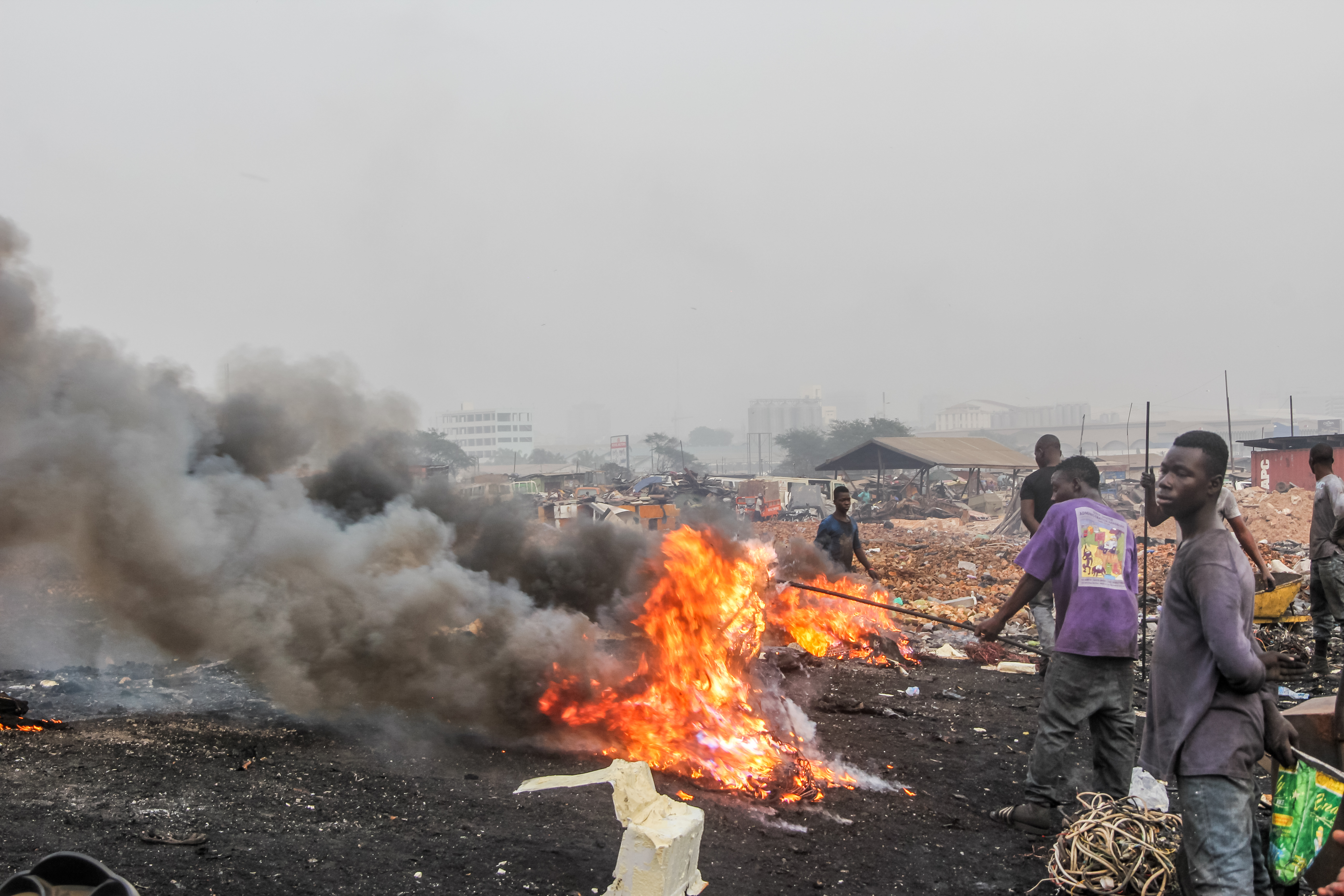
Thousands of Ghanaians were involved in the Agbogbloshie urban mine where waste was recycled at the cost of human health

In urban mining, the main motivation is recovery of materials while in "landfill mining" the goal is solving the problem at the disposal level.

In developing countries, people tend to recycle e-waste at informal sites, including inside homes, without the use of proper equipment and waste management techniques.

Research published by the Japanese government's National Institute of Materials Science in 2010 estimated that there were 6,800 tonnes of gold recoverable from used electronic equipment in Japan.

There is also an international assembly on reusing waste electronics to produce new electronic gadgets. The most recent assembly was held from 21st of May 2025 to 23rd of May in Procida, Italy

== See also ==
- E-waste
- Construction waste
- Demolition waste
- Circular economy
