= Wheel washing system =

A wheel washing system is a device used to clean the tires of trucks when they are leaving a site, helping to control and eliminate pollution of public roads. The installation can be made in or above the ground for either temporary or permanent applications. There are two types of wheel washing systems: roller systems and drive-through systems.
