= Low field magnetoresistance =

Property of crystalline structures

Low field magnetoresistance' ("LFMR") is the tendency of some materials, such as perovskite crystals, to increase their electrical resistance, when under the effect of a low strength magnetic field. LFMR is a form of magnetoresistance. This is caused by spin polarised tunneling, and spin dependent scattering, across large angle boundaries.

== Discovery from CMR research ==
Colossal magnetoresistance (CMR) was a known property in many perovskite oxides. However, this required a large external magnetic field, which hindered the practical applications, as a colossal magnetic field could not be generated outside of the lab.

This led to two approaches to finding a more practical form of magnetoresistance.

1. Looking to find the original cause of CMR from the theoretical side
2. Finding ways to improve the strength of the CMR effect

Large, as opposed to colossal, magnetoresistance had already been reported in doped LaMnO_{3} polycrystal samples, at relatively low magnetic fields. This was in contrast to single crystal samples which required larger magnetic fields.

This led to the discovery that spin polarized tunneling and spin dependent scattering across large angle boundaries lead to Low field magnetoresistance (LFMR).

== LFMR in Epitaxial Films ==
In order to obtain LFMR in epitaxial thin films (single-crystal like materials), epitaxial strain has been used. Wang and Li reported an enhancement of the magnetoresistance in 5- to 15-nm-thick Pr0.67Sr0.33MO3 films using out-of-plane tensile strain.

In a conventional strain engineering framework, epitaxial strain is only effective below the critical thickness, which is usually less than a few tens of nanometers. Tuning electron transport by epitaxial strain has only been achieved in ultrathin layers because of the relaxation of epitaxial strains in relatively thick films.

Vertically aligned heteroepitaxial nanoscaffolding films have been proposed to generate strain in thick films. A vertical lattice strain as large as 2% has been achieved in La0.7Sr0.3MnO3:MgO vertical nanocomposites. The magnetoresistance, magnetic anisotropy, and magnetization can be tuned by the vertical strain in films over few hundred nanometers thick.
