= Landfill =

Site for the disposal of waste materials

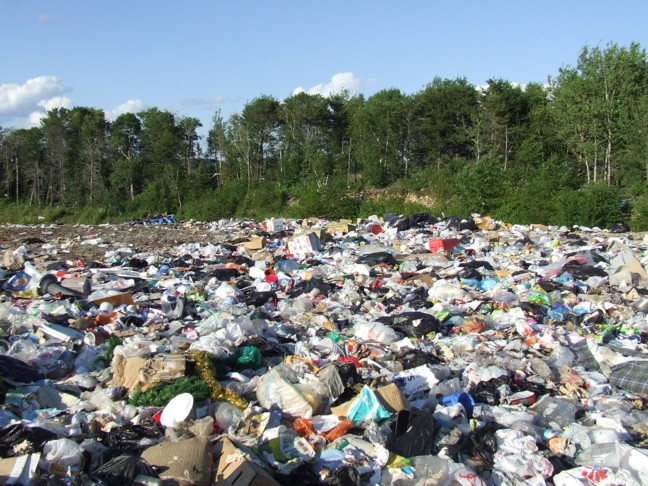
One of several landfills used by Dryden, Ontario, Canada

A landfill (Note: Also known as a tip, dump, rubbish tip, rubbish dump, garbage dump, trash dump, dumpsite, or dumping ground.) is a site for the disposal of waste materials, including municipal solid waste. It is the oldest and most common form of waste disposal, although the systematic burial of waste with daily, intermediate, and final covers only began in the 1940s. In the past, waste was simply left in piles or thrown into pits (known in archeology as middens).

Landfills take up significant amounts of land and pose environmental risks. Some landfill sites are used for waste management purposes, such as temporary storage, consolidation, and transfer, or for various stages of processing waste material, such as sorting, treatment, or recycling. Unless they are stabilized, landfills may undergo severe shaking or soil liquefaction during an earthquake. Once full, the area over a landfill site may be reclaimed for other uses.

Both active and restored landfill sites can have significant environmental impacts which can persist for many years. These include the release of landfill gases that contribute to climate change and the discharge of liquid landfill leachates containing high concentrations of polluting materials.

== Operations ==
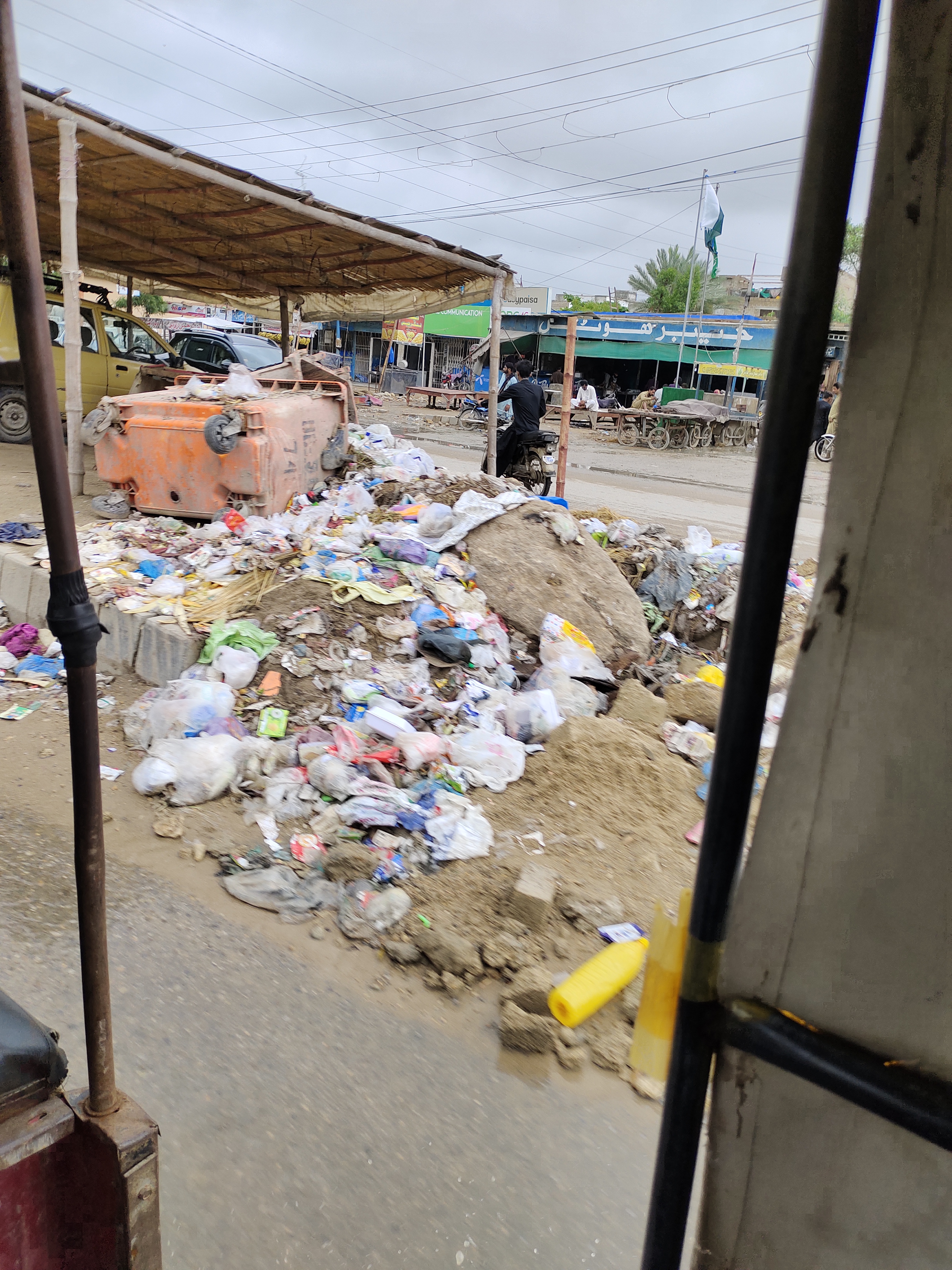
Garbage dumped in the middle of a road in Karachi, Pakistan

Operators of well-run landfills for non-hazardous waste meet predefined specifications by applying techniques to:

1. Confine waste to as small an area as possible
2. Compact waste to reduce volume

They can also cover the waste daily with layers of soil or other materials, such as wood chips and fine particles.

During landfill operations, a scale or weighbridge may weigh waste collection vehicles on arrival and personnel may inspect loads for wastes that do not accord with the landfill's waste-acceptance criteria. Afterward, the waste collection vehicles use the existing road network on their way to the tipping face or working front, where they unload their contents. After loads are deposited, compactors or bulldozers can spread and compact the waste on the working face. Before leaving the landfill boundaries, the waste collection vehicles may pass through a wheel-cleaning facility. If necessary, they return to the weighbridge for re-weighing without their load. The weighing process can assemble statistics on the daily incoming waste tonnage, which databases can retain for record keeping. In addition to trucks, some landfills may have equipment to handle railroad containers. The use of "rail-haul" permits landfills to be located at more remote sites, without the problems associated with many truck trips.

Typically, in the working face, the compacted waste is covered with soil or alternative materials daily. Alternative waste-cover materials include chipped wood or other "green waste", several sprayed-on foam products, chemically "fixed" bio-solids, and temporary blankets. Blankets can be lifted into place at night and then removed the following day prior to waste placement. The space that is occupied daily by the compacted waste and the cover material is called a daily cell. Waste compaction is critical to extending the life of the landfill. Factors such as waste compressibility, waste-layer thickness and the number of passes of the compactor over the waste affect the waste densities.

== Sanitary landfill life cycle ==
Sanitary landfill diagram

The term landfill is usually shorthand for a municipal landfill or sanitary landfill. These facilities were first introduced early in the 20th century, but gained wide use in the 1960s and 1970s, in an effort to eliminate open dumps and other "unsanitary" waste disposal practices. The sanitary landfill is an engineered facility that separates and confines waste. Sanitary landfills are intended as biological reactors in which microbes will break down complex organic waste into simpler, less toxic compounds over time. These reactors must be designed and operated according to regulatory standards and guidelines covered by the field of environmental engineering.

Aerobic decomposition is often the first stage by which wastes are broken down in a landfill. This process is followed by four stages of anaerobic degradation. Solid organic material typically decays rapidly as larger organic molecules degrade into smaller molecules. These smaller organic molecules begin to dissolve and move to the liquid phase, followed by hydrolysis of the organic molecules, and the hydrolyzed compounds then undergo transformation and volatilization as carbon dioxide (CO_{2}) and methane (CH_{4}), with the rest of the waste remaining in solid and liquid phases.

During the early phases, little material volume reaches the leachate as the biodegradable organic matter of the waste undergoes a rapid decrease in volume. Meanwhile, the leachate's chemical oxygen demand rises with increasing concentrations of the more recalcitrant compounds compared to the more reactive compounds in the leachate. Successful conversion and stabilization of the waste depends on how well microbial populations function in syntrophy.

The life cycle of a municipal landfill undergoes five distinct phases, as follows:

=== Initial adjustment (Phase I) ===
As the waste is placed in the landfill, the void spaces contain high volumes of molecular oxygen (O_{2}). With added and compacted wastes, the O_{2} content of the landfill bioreactor strata gradually decreases. Microbial populations grow, density increases. Aerobic biodegradation dominates, i.e. the primary electron acceptor is O_{2}.

=== Transition (Phase II) ===
The O_{2} is rapidly degraded by the existing microbial populations. The decreasing O_{2} leads to less aerobic and more anaerobic conditions in the layers. The primary electron acceptors during transition are nitrates and sulphates since O_{2} is rapidly displaced by CO_{2} in the effluent gas.

=== Acid formation (Phase III) ===
Hydrolysis of the biodegradable fraction of the solid waste begins in the acid formation phase, which leads to rapid accumulation of volatile fatty acids (VFAs) in the leachate. The increased organic acid content decreases the leachate pH from approximately 7.5 to 5.6. During this phase, the decomposition intermediate compounds like the VFAs contribute much chemical oxygen demand (COD). Long-chain volatile organic acids (VOAs) are converted to acetic acid (C_{2}H_{4}O_{2}), CO_{2}, and hydrogen gas (H_{2}). High concentrations of VFAs increase both the biochemical oxygen demand (BOD) and VOA concentrations, which initiates H_{2} production by fermentative bacteria, which stimulates the growth of H_{2}-oxidizing bacteria. The H_{2} generation phase is relatively short because it is complete by the end of the acid formation phase. The increase in the biomass of acidogenic bacteria increases the amount of degradation of the waste material and consuming nutrients. Metals, which are generally more water-soluble at lower pH, may become more mobile during this phase, leading to increasing metal concentrations in the leachate.

=== Methane fermentation (Phase IV) ===
The acid formation phase intermediary products (e.g., acetic, propionic, and butyric acids) are converted to CH_{4} and CO_{2} by methanogenic microorganisms. As VFAs are metabolized by the methanogens, the landfill water pH returns to neutrality. The leachate's organic strength, expressed as oxygen demand, decreases at a rapid rate with increases in CH_{4} and CO_{2} gas production. This is the longest decomposition phase.

=== Final maturation and stabilization (Phase V) ===
The rate of microbiological activity slows during the last phase of waste decomposition as the supply of nutrients limits the chemical reactions, e.g. as bioavailable phosphorus becomes increasingly scarce. CH_{4} production almost completely disappears, with O_{2} and oxidized species gradually reappearing in the gas wells as O_{2} permeates downwardly from the troposphere. This transforms the oxidation–reduction potential (ORP) in the leachate toward oxidative processes. The residual organic materials may incrementally be converted to the gas phase, and as organic matter is composted; i.e. the organic matter is converted to humic-like compounds.

== Social and environmental impact ==
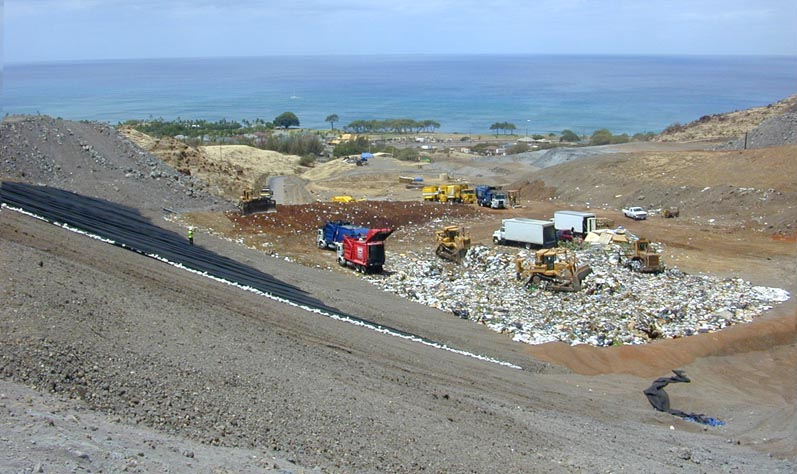
Landfill operation in Hawaii. The area being filled is a single, well-defined "cell" and a protective landfill liner is in place (exposed on the left) to prevent contamination by leachates migrating downward through the underlying geological formation.

Landfills have the potential to cause a number of issues. Infrastructure disruption, such as damage to access roads by heavy vehicles, may occur. Pollution of local roads and watercourses from wheels on vehicles when they leave the landfill can be significant and can be mitigated by wheel washing systems. Pollution of the local environment, such as contamination of groundwater or aquifers or soil contamination may occur as well.

=== Leachate ===
When precipitation falls on open landfills, or when water is released from the breakdown of waste, water percolates through the waste and becomes contaminated with suspended and dissolved material, forming leachate enriched with organic matter, heavy metals, organic contaminants, and other contaminants present in the waste. If this is not contained it can contaminate groundwater. All modern landfill sites use a combination of impermeable liners several metres thick, geologically stable sites, and collection systems to contain and capture this leachate. It can then be treated and evaporated. Once a landfill site is full, it is sealed off to prevent precipitation entering the landfill and formation of new leachate. However, liners have a lifespan, often several hundred years or more, but eventually any landfill liner could leak, so the ground around landfills must be tested for leachate to prevent pollutants from contaminating groundwater.

The largest problem in sanitary landfills with regard to leachate quality is nitrogen, particularly in the form of ammonium nitrogen. Hydrolysis of waste results in the release of carbon species such as bicarbonate and acetic acid as well as the release of ammonium. The anaerobic environment present in landfills does not allow for coupled nitrification-denitrification, the typical nitrogen removal pathway in soils, which can lead to an accumulation of ammonium in the leachate and concentrations upwards of several thousand milligrams per liter.

=== Decomposition gases ===
Anaerobic digestion of organic waste by microbes results in the generation of decomposition gases, particularly of CO_{2} and CH_{4}. The fraction of gas constituents depends foremost on available oxygen, and further varies depending on landfill age, waste type, moisture content, and other factors. On average, about half of the volumetric concentration of landfill gas is CH_{4}, and slightly less than half is CO_{2}; the ratio shifts towards more CO_{2} upon increasing aerobic degradation. The average landfill gas further contains about 5% molecular nitrogen (N_{2}), less than 1% hydrogen sulfide (H_{2}S), and low concentrations of non-methane organic compounds (NMOC), about 2700 parts per million by volume. The maximum amount of landfill gas produced can be illustrated by a simplified net reaction of diethyl oxalate that accounts for these simultaneous reactions:

4 C_{6}H_{10}O_{4} + 6 H_{2}O → 13 CH_{4} + 11 CO_{2}

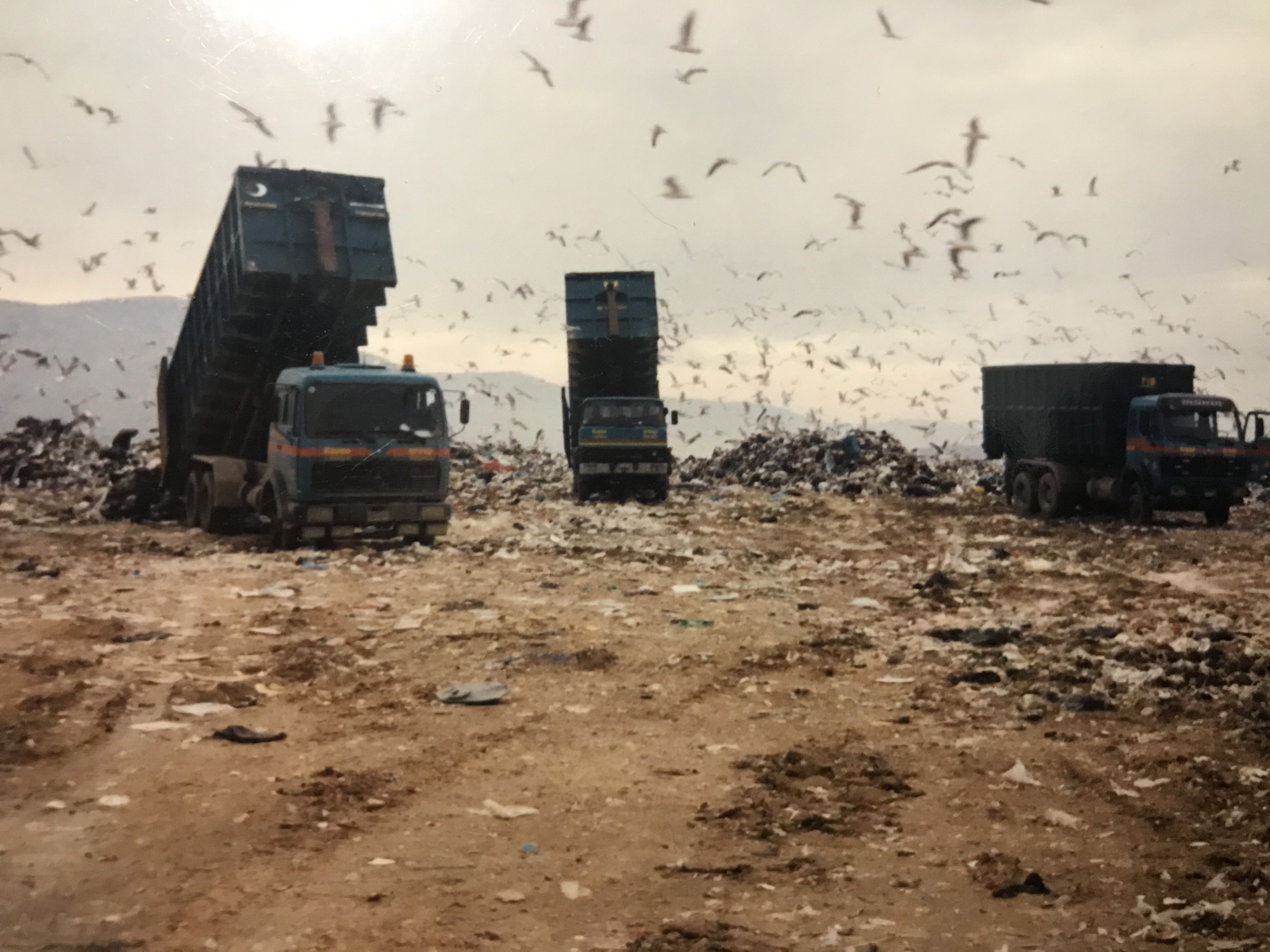
Waste disposal in Athens, Greece

Landfill gases can seep out of the landfill and into the surrounding air and soil. This makes landfills a significant source of greenhouse gases in the form of CO_{2} and particularly CH_{4}, with landfills being the 3rd largest emitter of CH_{4} worldwide and CH_{4} having a global warming potential of 29.8 ± 11 relative to CO_{2} over a period of 100 years, and 82.5 ± 25.8 over a period of 20 years. Properly managed landfills ensure collection and usage of gases. This can range from simple flaring to get rid of the gas to landfill gas utilization for electricity generation. Monitoring landfill gas alerts workers to the presence of a build-up of gases to a harmful level. In some countries, landfill gas recovery is extensive; in the United States, for example, more than 850 landfills have active landfill gas recovery systems.

=== Other nuisances ===
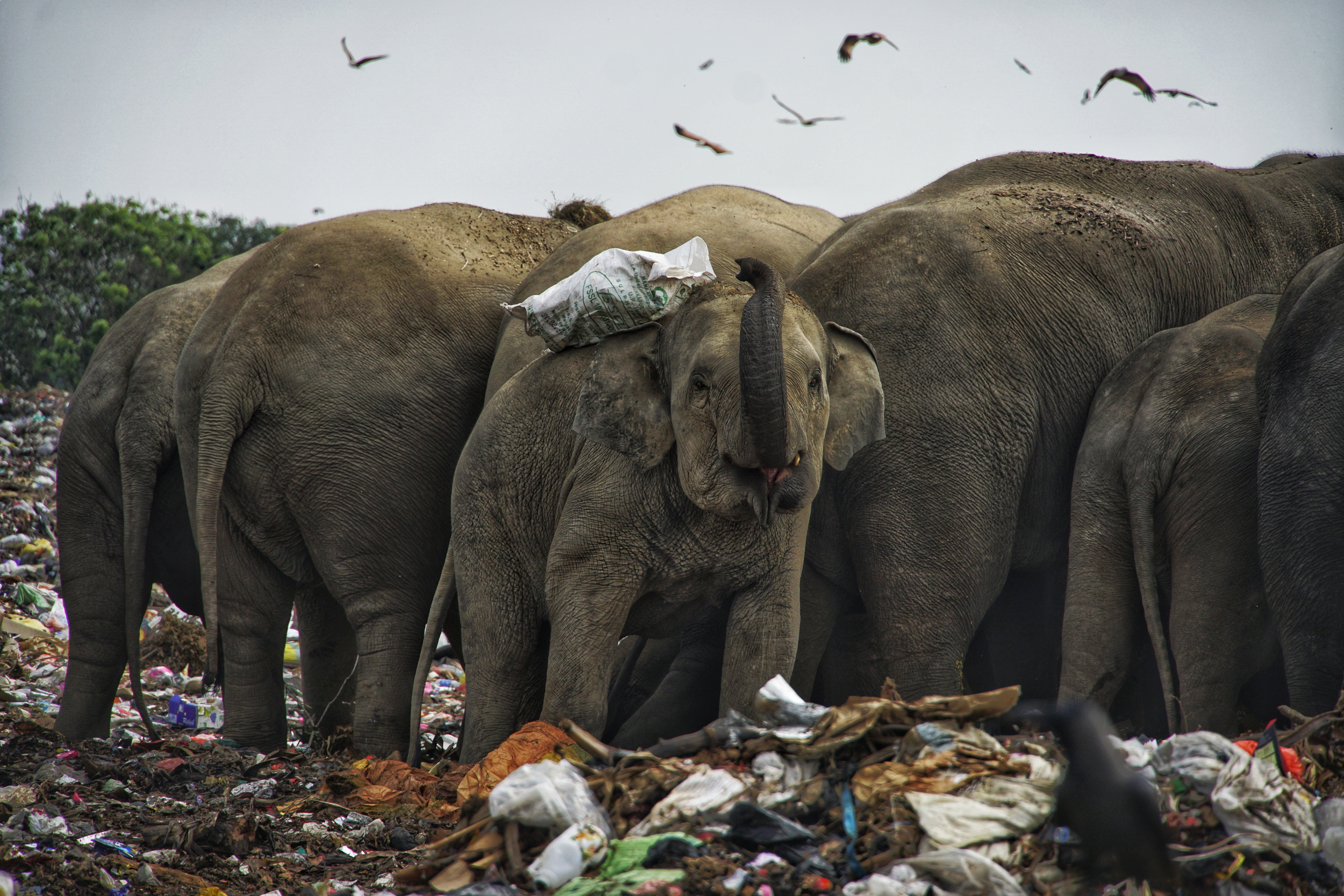
A group of wild elephants interacting with a trash dump in Sri Lanka

Other potential issues of landfills include wildlife disruption due to occupation of habitat and animal health disruption caused by consuming waste from landfills, dust, odor, noise pollution, and reduced local property values. Poorly run landfills may further become nuisances because of vectors such as rats and flies which can spread infectious diseases. The occurrence of such vectors can be mitigated through the use of daily cover.

== Landfill aftercare ==
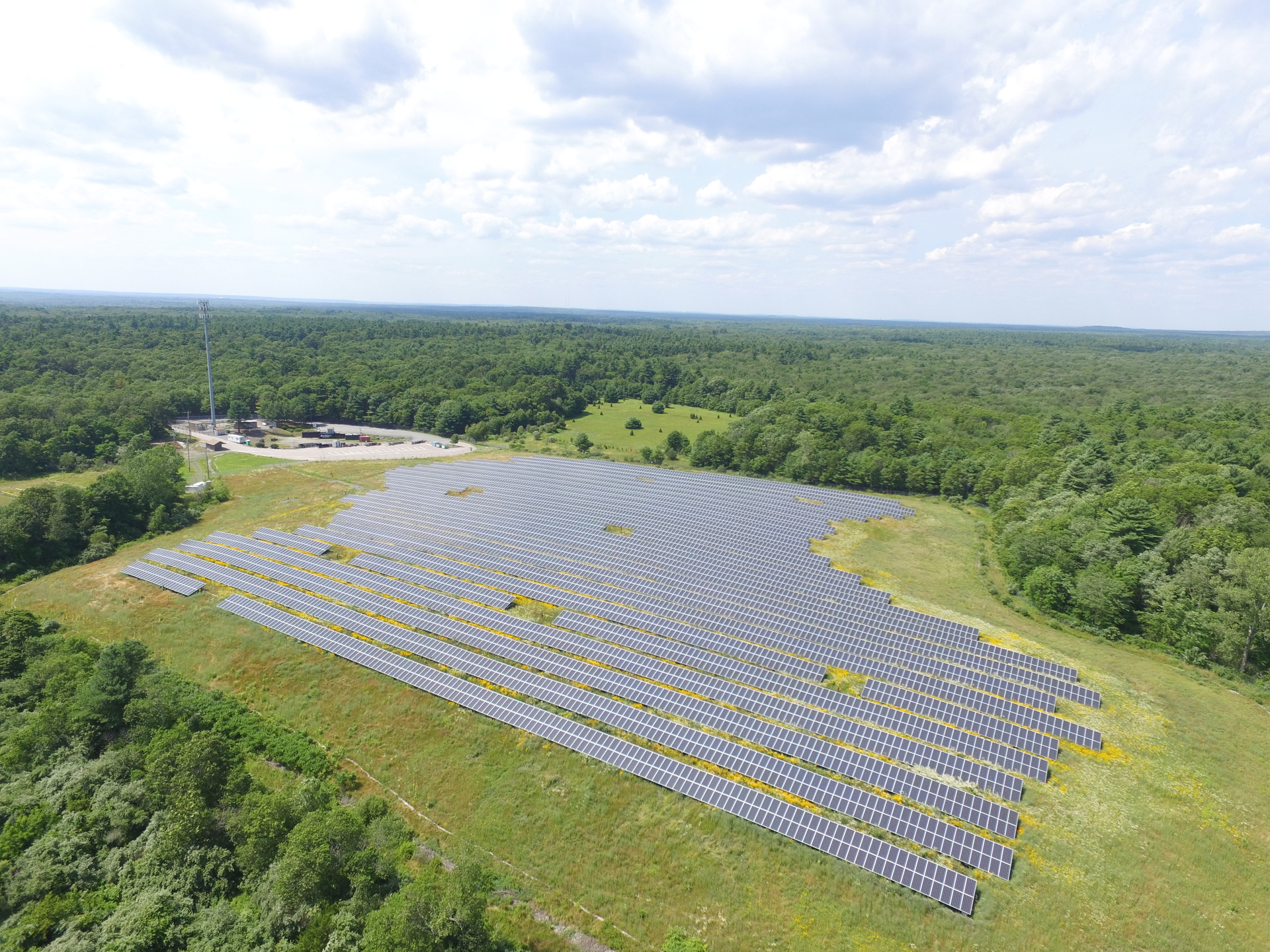
Solar arrays on a full landfill in Rehoboth, MA

Once a landfill is filled, a top liner or cap is placed on top of the landfill to prevent further inflow of precipitation. The landfill subsequently enters the "aftercare" stage. During aftercare, environmental impacts are minimized through the (re)placement of liners, capture of greenhouse gases, and treatment of contaminant-rich leachates. Estimated duration of aftercare has been estimated between several decades up to eternity with an estimated aftercare cost of more than 20 million euros per landfill in the Netherlands.

== Sustainability ==
=== Bioreactor landfill ===
The practice of sanitary landfilling poses challenges with regard to sustainability. Once the lifetime of the landfill is completed, and it enters its aftercare period, the typical practice of sealing the waste with liners restricts contaminants within the landfill and prevents the waste from being subdued to environmental factors. The waste's potential to pollute the environment is thus maintained within the landfill, and the replacement of liners and treatment of leachate is an indefinite requirement. Certain countries, such as the Netherlands, consequently consider the necessity of long-term aftercare, up-to eternal. An alternative strategy is to operate the landfill as a bioreactor, which stimulates the degradation process by either aerating the waste or recirculating leachate through the waste body. Bioreactor landfills stimulate the removal of contaminants to a point where contaminant emissions no longer threaten the environment. At this point, placement of liners and treatment of gas and leachate is no longer required, significantly limiting costs and reducing the impact on future generations. Additional benefits include a stimulated gas production during the active treatment period, allowing for a more efficient potential for energy generation during a shorter timeframe.

=== Material reclamation ===
One can treat landfills as a viable and abundant source of materials and energy. In the developing world, waste pickers often scavenge for still-usable materials. In commercial contexts, companies have also discovered landfill sites, and many have begun harvesting materials and energy. Well-known examples include gas-recovery facilities. Other commercial facilities include waste incinerators which have built-in material recovery. This material recovery is possible through the use of filters (electro filter, active-carbon and potassium filter, quench, HCl-washer, SO_{2}-washer, bottom ash-grating, etc.).

=== Landfill restoration ===
Following placement of the cap and closure of the landfill, the area is oftentimes re-purposed. Popular alternative land-uses include recreational purposes (e.g. mountain bike courses), the placement of solar panels to create solar array farms, parks, or living areas.

== Regional practice ==
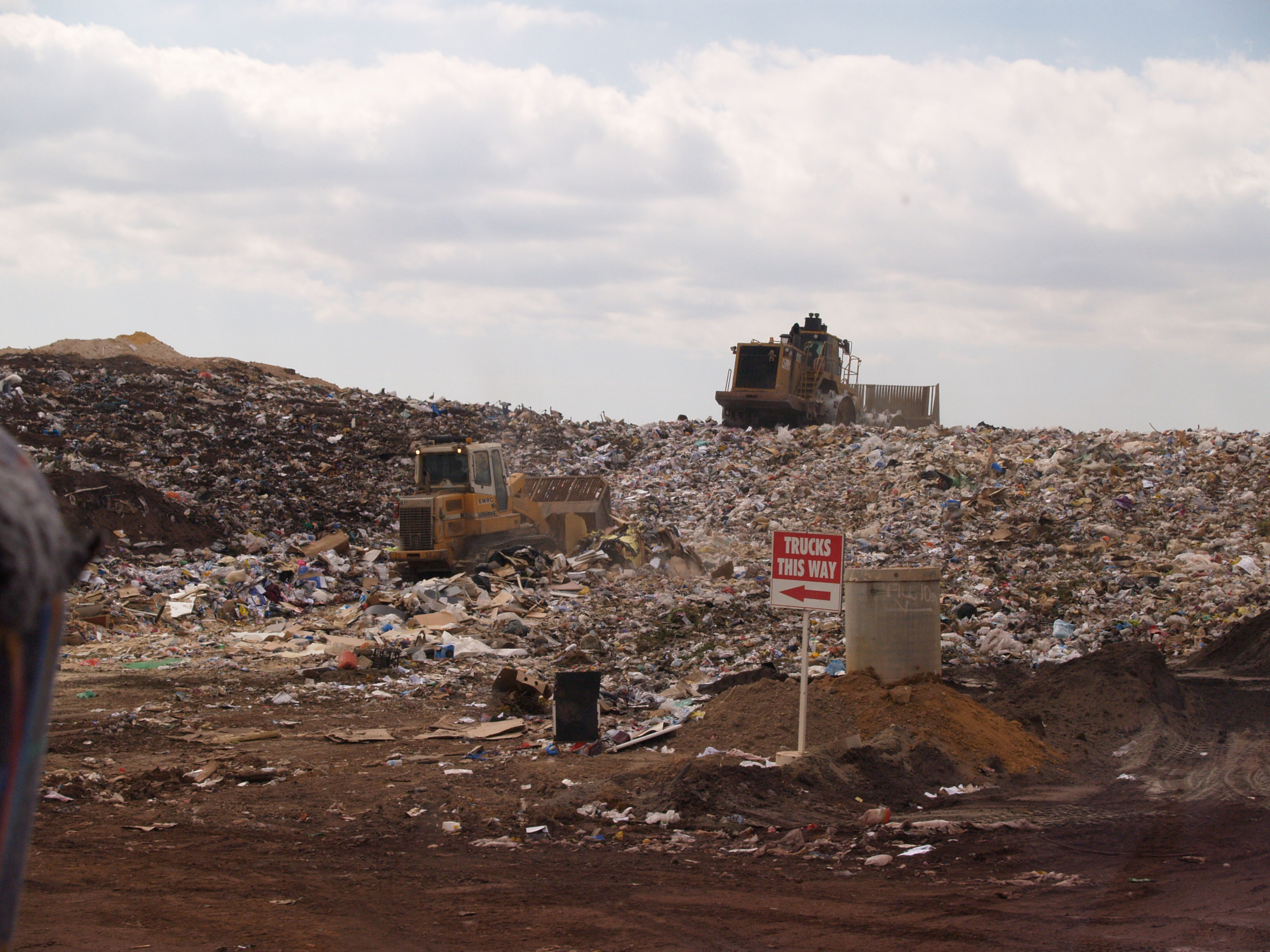
A landfill in Perth, Western Australia

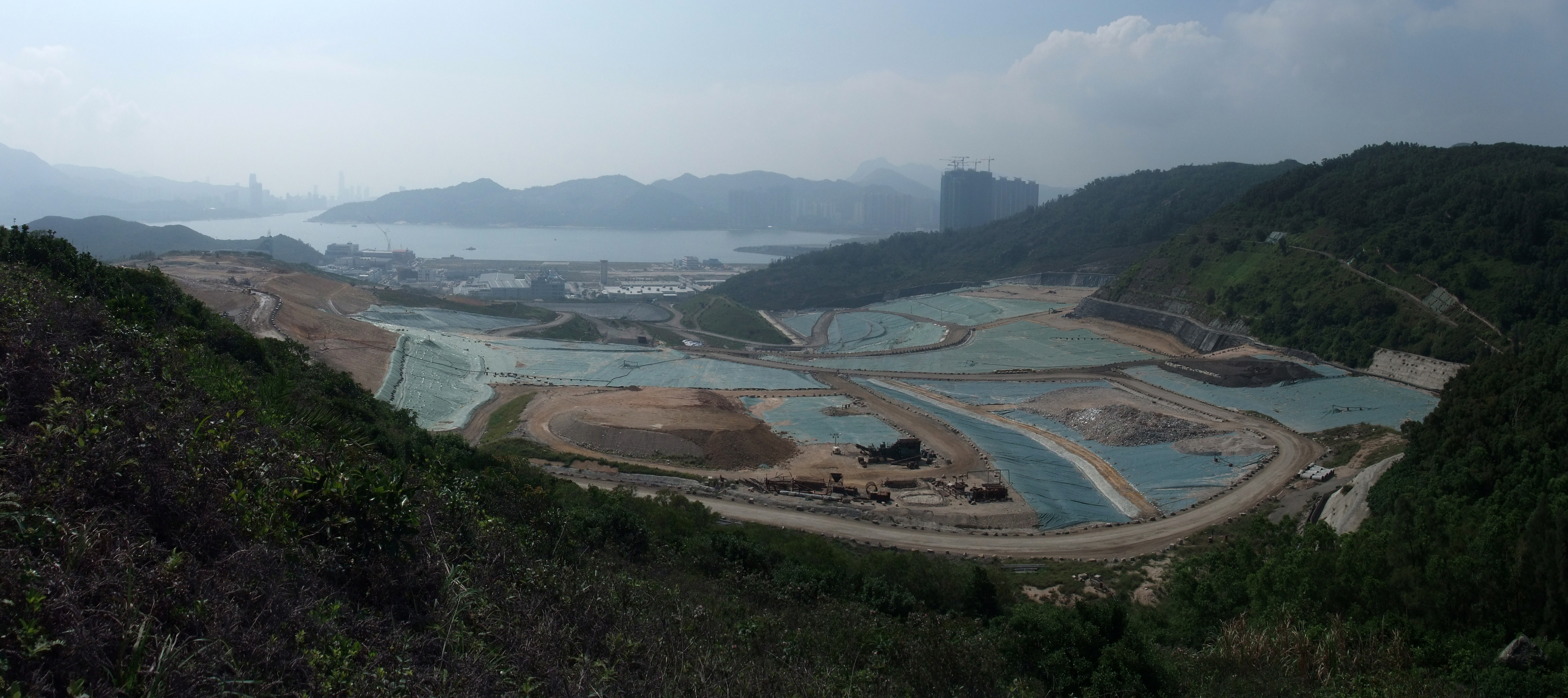
South East New Territories Landfill, Hong Kong

=== Canada ===
Landfills in Canada are regulated by provincial environmental agencies and environmental protection legislation. Older facilities tend to fall under current standards and are monitored for leaching. Some former locations have been converted to parkland.

=== European Union ===
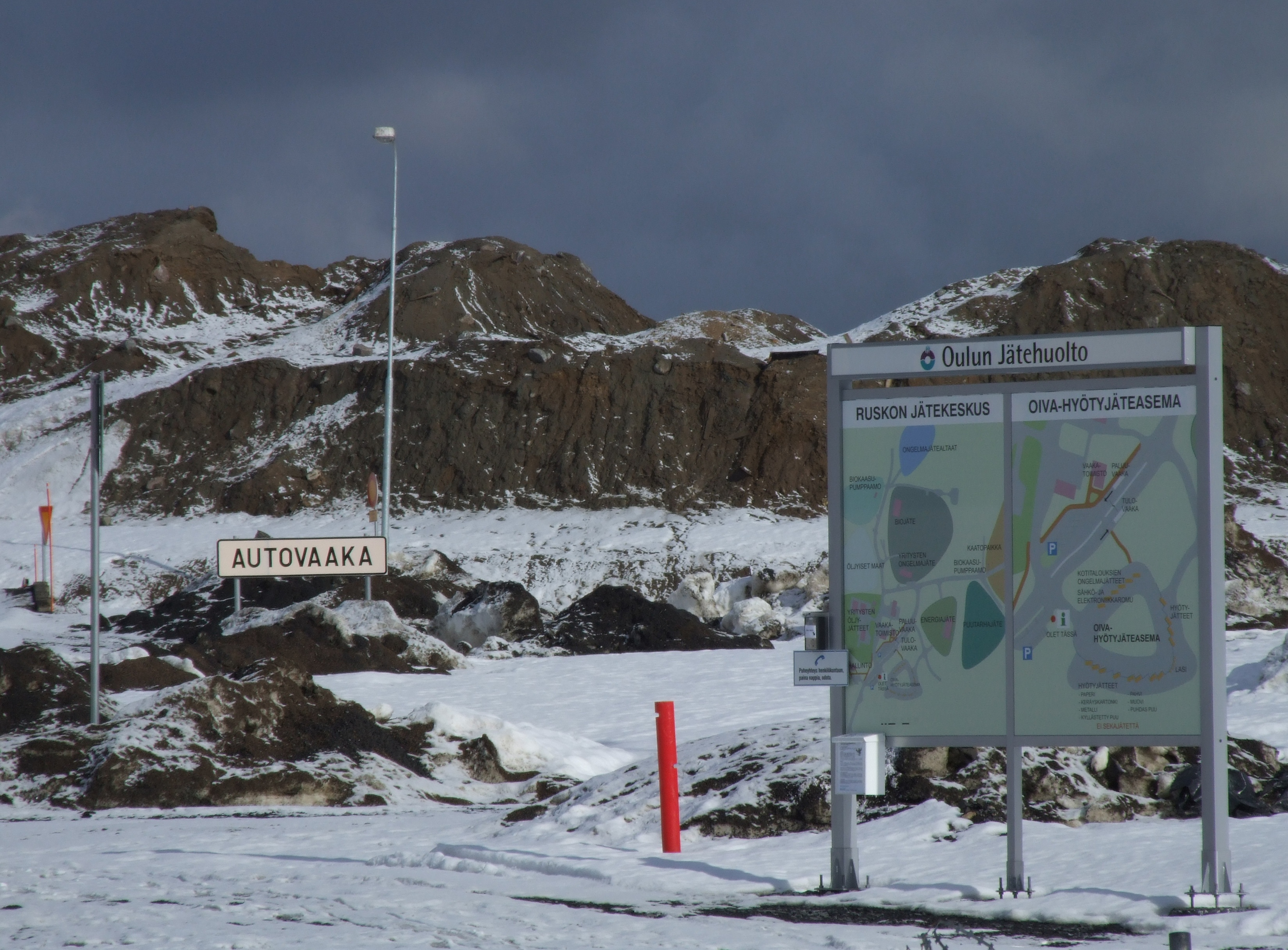
The Rusko landfill in Oulu, Finland

In the European Union, individual states are obliged to enact legislation to comply with the requirements and obligations of the European Landfill Directive.

The majority of EU member states have laws banning or severely restricting the disposal of household trash via landfills.

=== India ===
Landfilling is currently the major method of municipal waste disposal in India. India also has Asia's largest dumping ground in Deonar, Mumbai. However, issues frequently arise due to the alarming growth rate of landfills and poor management by authorities. On and under surface fires have been commonly seen in the Indian landfills over the last few years.

=== United Kingdom ===
Landfilling practices in the UK have had to change in recent years to meet the challenges of the European Landfill Directive. The UK now imposes landfill tax upon biodegradable waste which is put into landfills. In addition to this the Landfill Allowance Trading Scheme has been established for local authorities to trade landfill quotas in England. A different system operates in Wales where authorities cannot 'trade' amongst themselves, but have allowances known as the Landfill Allowance Scheme.

=== United States ===
U.S. landfills are regulated by each state's environmental agency, which establishes minimum guidelines; however, none of these standards may fall below those set by the United States Environmental Protection Agency (EPA).

Permitting a landfill generally takes between five and seven years, costs millions of dollars and requires rigorous siting, engineering and environmental studies and demonstrations to ensure local environmental and safety concerns are satisfied.

== Types ==
- Municipal solid waste: takes in household waste and nonhazardous material. Included in this type of landfill is a bioreactor landfill that specifically degrades organic material.
- Industrial waste: for commercial and industrial waste. Other related landfills include Construction and Demolition Debris Landfills and Coal Combustion Residual Landfills.
- Hazardous waste or PCB waste: Polychlorinated Biphenyl (PCB) landfills that are monitored in the United States by the Toxic Substances Control Act of 1976 (TSCA).

== Microbial topics ==
The status of a landfill's microbial community may determine its digestive efficiency.

Bacteria that digest plastic have been found in landfills.

== Alternatives ==
In addition to waste reduction and recycling strategies, there are various alternatives to landfills, including waste-to-energy incineration, anaerobic digestion, composting, mechanical biological treatment, pyrolysis and plasma arc gasification. Depending on local economics and incentives, these can be made more financially attractive than landfills.

The goal of the zero waste concept is to minimize landfill volume.

== Restrictions ==
Countries including Germany, Austria, Sweden, Denmark, Belgium, the Netherlands, and Switzerland, have banned the disposal of untreated waste in landfills.

== See also ==
- Bioreactor landfill – Dump with fast microbial decomposition
- Daily cover
- Deep geological repository – Long term storage for radioactive and hazardous waste
- Fly-tipping – Act of dumping waste illegally
- Hydrologic Evaluation of Landfill Performance (HELP) model
- Land reclamation – Creating new land from oceans, seas, riverbeds or lakes
- Landfarming
- Landfill diversion
- Landfill restoration – Process of landfill transformation
- Landfill tax – Tax levied on landfill operators to discourage landfill use
- Marine debris – Human-created solid waste in the sea or ocean
- Midden – Old dump for domestic waste
- Milorganite – Brand of biosolids fertilizer produced by treating sewage sludge
- National Waste & Recycling Association
- NIMBY – Opposition to nearby development projects
- Open dump – Act of dumping waste illegally
- Recycling rates by country
- Sludge – Semi-solid slurry
