= Landfill restoration =

Process of landfill transformation

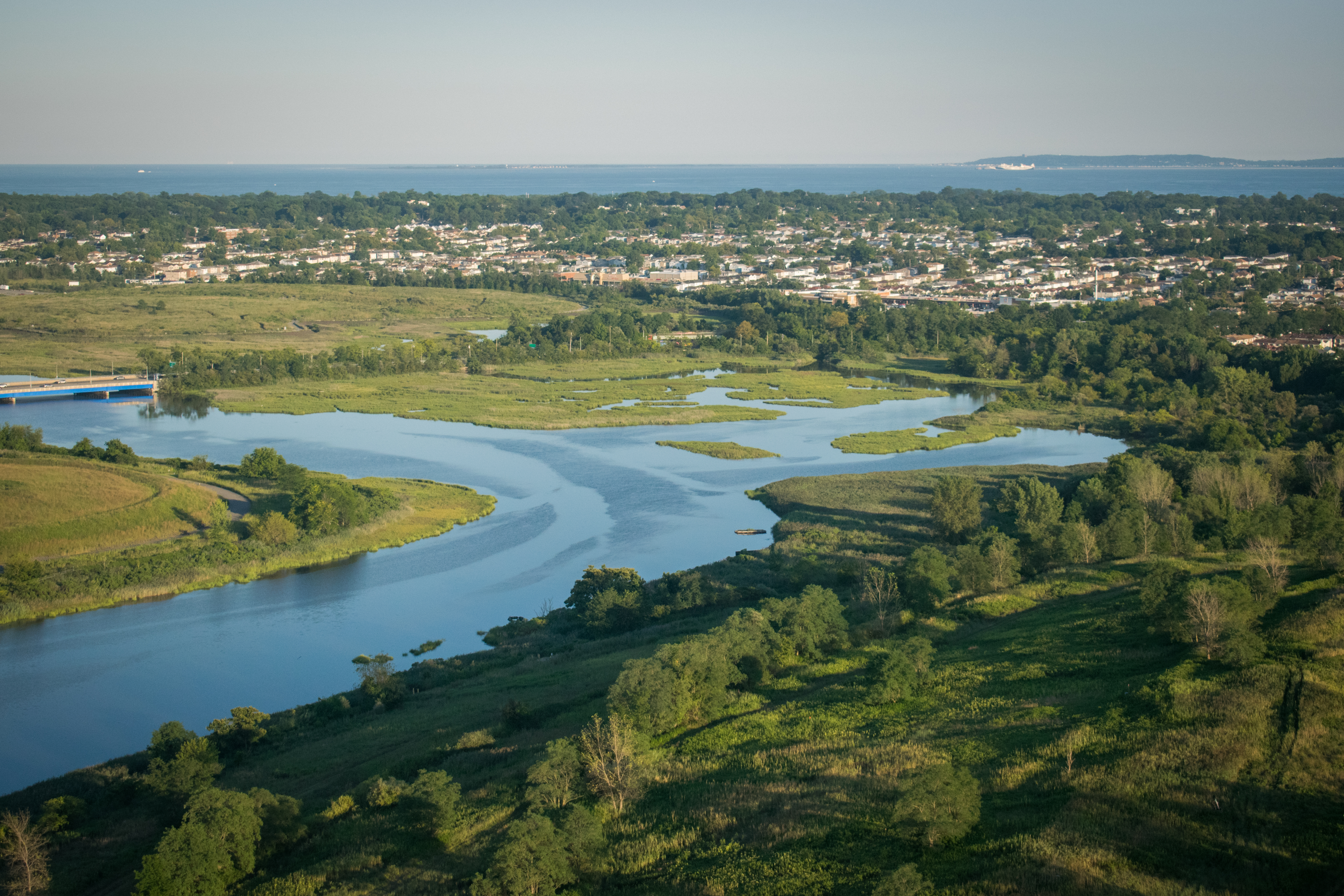
Freshkills Park, a public park under construction on Staten Island in New York City, built on top of the former Fresh Kills Landfill

Landfill restoration refers to the process of covering a landfill once it has reached its maximum capacity and transforming it into usable land. This process usually consists of covering it with a top layer of soil and impermeable materials, also called capping, to ensure that vegetation could grow. Studies have shown that capping landfills promotes vegetation growth, which provides additional benefits such as reducing rainfall infiltration, decreasing and mitigating soil erosion, improving ecological diversity, and improves the visual appearance of the landfill site. Restoring landfill sites is considered essential to recuperate ecosystems, to minimize any negative impacts the site had on the environment, and to ensure that the site is safe for any future use.

== Vegetation succession ==
Once a landfill is capped, restoring the land with vegetation has been considered as an appealing approach since it reconnects the degraded land with the surrounding natural environment. Most landfill restoration approaches have been artificial strategies which are not effective for long-term use, whereas vegetation succession that is based on natural processes is a more sustainable strategy. Studies have shown that using composted green waste to cap landfills provides additional nutrients to the soil and improves the soil's physical structure and aids its water retention, which efficiently improves the vegetation succession (trees and plants) on restored landfills.

== Regional studies ==
=== Hong Kong ===
A 10-year study done at the SENT landfill in Tai Chik Sha in Tseung Kwan O, Hong Kong, shows that plant and tree species could survive following the restoration of a landfill. The site was initially lined with a multilayer composite bottom layer, then had a landfill gas and landfill leachate collection system incorporated, and was covered by a final layer system. In the initial stages of restoration, vegetation was planted to establish plant communities on the site. Within the 10 years of the study, 19 species native to Hong Kong were recorded on the site, with more than 60% being trees and with 30% consisting of shrubs and herbs. The tree species recorded included but was not limited to: A. confusa, A. auriculiformis, and Heptapleurum heptaphyllum. In addition, to the tree species, other plant species were recorded on the site from 16 families, with the most dominant three families being the Araliaceae, Convolvulaceae, and Mimosaceae. The presence of vegetation on the restored sites also received up to 44 animal species, mainly invertebrate species but also included frogs, lizards, and geckos. Ultimately, the results show that, "the restored landfill sites were able to support the establishment and growth of plant communities, becoming a semi-natural habitat 10 years after restoration".

=== Italy ===
A three-year study done in Northern Italy of two reclaimed landfill sites in the Po flood plain shows that the application of a recovery pattern could enhance the biodiversity of the land. After the final layer of soil was placed on the landfills, they were both converted into meadows enclosed by a hedgerow. To improve the soil fertility of the reclaimed landfills and to increase biodiversity, the herbaceous plants Fabaceae and Graminaceae were sown on the land. The study also considered butterflies and birds as an indicator of the level of biodiversity on the restored site because of their association with vegetation composition and because of how promptly they respond to changes in the landscape. In addition to the herbaceous plants, tree and shrub clusters were also introduced to the land to attempt the possibility of a forest restoration. The results from this study show that the creation of the meadow on the landfill site was beneficial for pollinators and it indicates that restored habitats could recover the biodiversity of the land. However, a limiting factor of this site was that it is a poor breeding site for bird reproduction due to the scarce development of a tree layer.

Another study in the Puglia Region of Southern Italy notes that the stresses of hot climate and drought, which is typically found in Mediterranean areas, affect the adaptability of vegetation species on restored landfills. The researchers of the study note that the Puglia region is "the most drought-ridden of Italy and a dry Mediterranean macroclimate characterizes the area", with an average annual precipitation of 500–700 mm and an annual average temperature of 16.8 °C. The study consisted of planting eight herbaceous species (four legumes: Hedysarum coronarium, Trifolium repens, Medicago sativa, Lotus corniculatus, and four grasses: Festuca sp., Lolium perenne, Dactylis glomerata, Bromus sp.). The results show that only three legumes H. coronarium, M. sativa and L. corniculatus grew successfully based on their growth, ground cover, and bloom, whereas the T. repens was not successful, and that the four grasses showed low ground cover and withered during the dry seasonal periods. Ultimately, maintaining appropriate soil moisture by using a drop irrigation system contributed to the survival of certain species during the summer dry periods, which indicates that the survival of plants on restored landfills in Mediterranean climate is plausible.

=== United Kingdom ===
A study done for nine restored landfill sites in East Midlands, United Kingdom shows the potential for restored landfill sites to increase pollinator populations in flower-rich grasslands. On these sites, there was a total of 63 species of insect pollinated plants found, with 19 found exclusively on the restored sites compared to the reference sites. Due to these plants, 41 insect species were found on the restored sites, in which 405 individual insects were counted. The most abundant native pollinators of all species were two species of bumblebees: the Bombus terretris and Bombus lapidarius. The success to the abundance of plants and insects found on these restored sites is mainly attributed to the new policies implemented in the United Kingdom to regulate landfill restoration in addition to improved restoration practices. Additionally, the success of these restored sites is also due to the use of insect pollinated plants on the land which then contributes to the pollination of other flowering plants - ultimately proving that landfill restoration provides an excellent resource in improving populations of pollinator insects.

== Areas of further research ==
=== Canada ===
Parc Frédéric-Back, located in Montréal, is a former limestone quarry which was also used as a landfill site that recently became transformed into a public park, with its completion expected in 2026. This site contains approximately 40 million tons of landfill waste since its initiation in 1986 until it was closed in 2009. The Master Plan of the park is expected to include a meadow, a forest, terraces, and a Crown area that hosts the cultural, sports and industrial-commercial-poles, in addition to the 17 entrances to the park. The objectives of the Master Plan include increasing knowledge of environmental rehabilitation, enhancing the quality of life of the surrounding residents, and protecting and improving biodiversity in Montréal—the latter which has yet to be evaluated since the construction of the park is still fairly new.
