= Daily cover =

The daily cover on an operational landfill site is the layer of compressed soil or earth which is laid on top of a day's deposition of waste. Benefits of using daily cover include:

- Reduction of odor and air emissions
- Control of disease vectors (birds, insects, and rodents)
- Improved surface stability for landfill vehicles
- Control of litter
- Reduction of leachate generation (cover reduces infiltration of rainwater and runoff into the waste mass)
- Fire prevention (cover reduces contact of combustible materials with air and ignition sources, and can act as a temporary firebreak)

Work at the Fresno Sanitary Landfill was instrumental in establishing the need and utility of daily cover.

Federal regulations in the United States require a minimum of six (6) inches of daily cover to be used at the end of each day.

While soils are the traditional materials employed in daily cover, alternative daily cover (ADC) options such as "green waste", mixtures of paper sludge, tire derived aggregate (TDA) and geosynthetic membranes have displayed mechanical characteristics desirable for daily cover. When compared to traditional soil layers, the paper sludge paste was 2–3 times lighter, at least two orders of magnitude less permeable, and comparable in shear strength.

== See also ==
- Biogas
- Landfill
- Final cover
