= International Geosynthetics Society =

Engineering professional society

- Abbreviation: IGS
- Formation: 1983; 43 years ago
- Type: Non-profit
- Purpose: Professional society
- Headquarters: Austin, Texas, United States
- Region served: Global
- Members: 3,000
- IGS Council President: Sam Allen
- Affiliations: Federation of International Geo-Engineering Societies
- Website: www.geosyntheticssociety.org

The International Geosynthetics Society (IGS) is an engineering professional society focused on the field of geosynthetics, which are polymeric materials used in geotechnical engineering. The IGS describes itself as "a learned society dedicated to the scientific and engineering development of geotextiles, geomembranes, related products, and associated technologies." It was founded in Paris in 1983 as the International Geotextile Society and is a member of the Federation of International Geo-Engineering Societies, along with the International Society of Soil Mechanics and Geotechnical Engineering (ISSMGE), International Society for Rock Mechanics and Rock Engineering (ISRM), and International Association for Engineering Geology and the Environment (IAEG).

The International Geosynthetics Society holds Liaison Organization status with International Organization for Standardization (ISO) Technical Committee 221 (TC 221) on Geosynthetics.

== History ==
The International Geosynthetics Society traces its roots back to April 1977 in Paris at the International Conference on the Use of Fabrics in Geotechnics. There, Dr. Jean-Pierre Giroud coined the terms "geotextiles" and "geomembranes." The event is now recognized as the 1st International Conference on Geosynthetics (1 ICG) by the IGS. Dr. Giroud had already established himself as an engineer who saw the technical potential in the use of polymeric materials for civil infrastructure, having used the materials in projects years ahead of the 1977 conference. These projects included the first use of a nonwoven filter geotextile and the first use of a geotextile in a dam.

An additional conference (now recognized as the 2nd International Conference on Geosynthetics) was organized by the Industrial Fabrics Association International in 1982 in Las Vegas. This helped connect more figures in the field and led to the seminal meeting in Paris on 10 November 1983 to officially form the International Geotextile Society. Dr. JP Giroud served as the first President.

Dr. Giroud credits engineer Joe Fluet with coining the term "geosynthetics" in 1983, though it was not until 1994 that the IGS replaced "Geotextile" with "Geosynthetics" in its official identity.

Following the organization's name change, the IGS began supporting more conferences as a means to growth and to stimulate discussion in the engineering community on how polymeric materials could better influence the service lives, economy, and sustainability of modern infrastructures. In addition to the quadrennial International Conference on Geosynthetics, the IGS launched quadrennial regional conferences beginning with Europe (Maastricht, Netherlands, 1995); Asia (Bangalore, India 1997); the Americas (Cancun, Mexico, 2008) and Africa (Cape Town, South Africa, 2009).

The 12th International Conference on Geosynthetics is scheduled for September 2023 in Rome, Italy.

The next IGS regional conferences will be GeoAfrica 2023 (Cairo, Egypt, February 2023).

The Society supports numerous awards to recognize the contributions of its members to geotechnical engineering, such as the Mercer Lecture series named for Dr. Brian Mercer, O.B.E., who is credited for inventing geogrids. The ISSMGE is a co-sponsor of the Mercer Lecture.

== Global Membership ==
The IGS currently has 47 chapters around the world, many of which host their own in-person and digital engineering education events. These chapters cover all world regions. The current international membership is greater than 3,000 individual practitioners and 167 corporate members. IGS Chapters account for more than 90% of the overall member roster.

== Governance ==
The society is governed by the IGS Council. Council leadership is provided by elected officers, who serve four-year terms. The positions for president, vice-president, and Treasurer are the only elected positions. The position of Secretary General is appointed by the council. The Immediate Past President is also an IGS Officer. Supporting the officers are general IGS Councilmembers, most of whom are elected to two-year terms. The IGS reserves the right to co-opt additional councilmembers to ensure international representation.

Day-to-day management is the responsibility of the Officers and an executive director. The current IGS Council President is Sam Allen, who was elected in 2022.

== Publications ==
The IGS has two official peer-reviewed journals: Geosynthetics International (published by United Kingdom-based Institution of Civil Engineers) and Geotextiles & Geomembranes (published by Elsevier). The publications, which are available by subscription or provided free for online access to IGS members, include technical papers, technical notes, discussions, and book reviews on all topics relevant to geosynthetics. As of 18 November 2022, both IGS journals are ranked by Scimago in the Top 25 for global geotechnical engineering and engineering geology journals.
