= Bituminous geomembrane =

Type of geomembrane

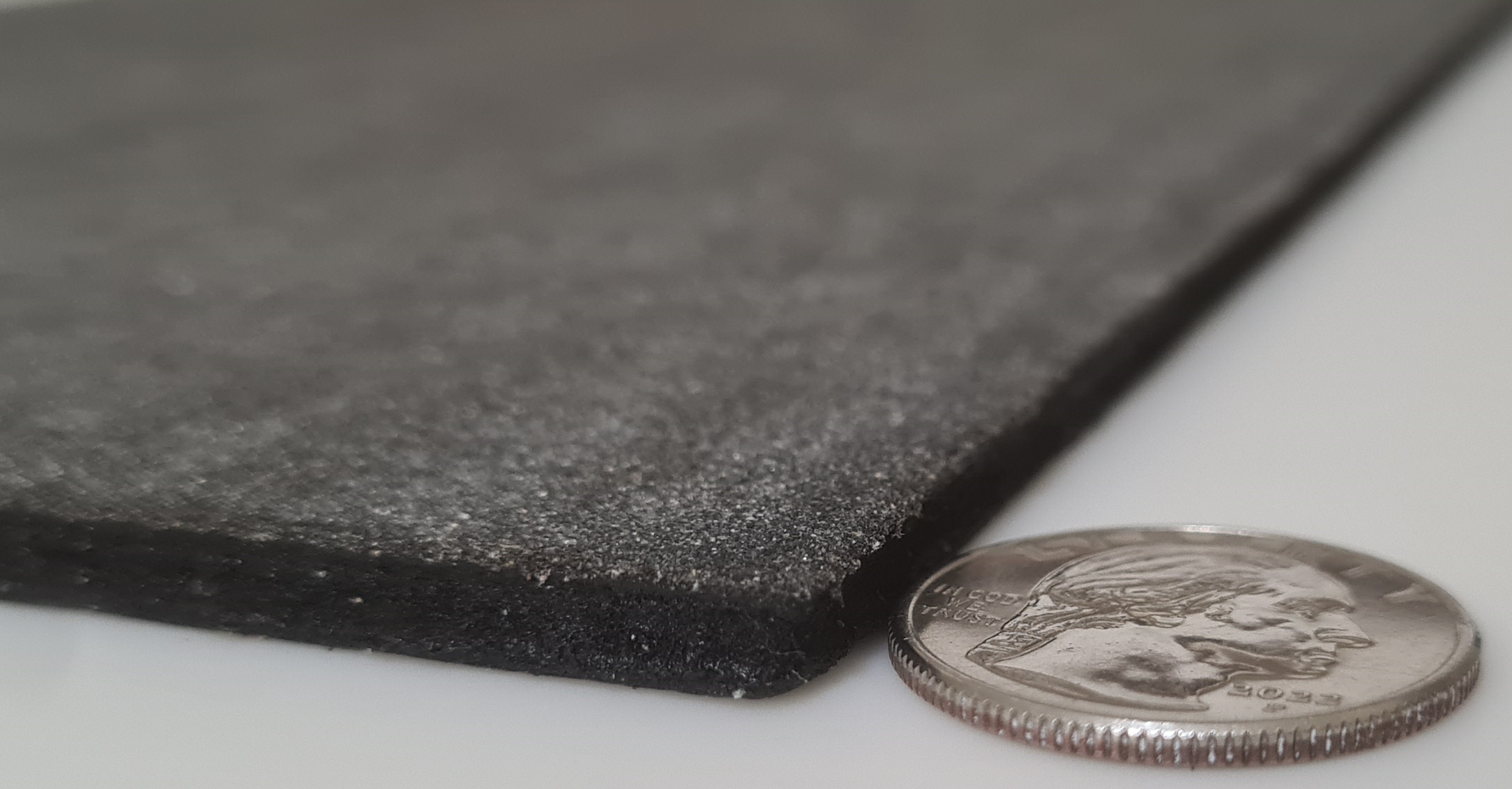
Bituminous Geomembrane sample

Bituminous geomembrane (BGM) is a type of geomembrane consisting of a reinforcing geotextile to provide mechanical strength and elastomeric bitumen (often called asphalt in U.S.) to provide impermeability. Other components such as sand, a glass fleece, and/or a polyester film can be incorporated into the layers of a BGM. Bituminous geomembranes are differentiated from bituminous waterproofing materials used in buildings due in part to their wide roll width, which can exceed 5m, and their substantial thickness of up to 6.0mm.

These properties are designed for environmental protection, civil infrastructure, and mining applications.

== Properties ==
Typical Intrinsic Properties of Bituminous Geomembranes
Property	Standard	Units	Value	Application Relevance
Coefficient of Linear Thermal Expansion	ASTM D 696	°C⁻¹	10^{−5}	A low coefficient of thermal expansion prevents problematic wrinkling with exposure to temperature variation.
Density	ASTM D 792-20	g/cm^{3}	1.27	High density (greater than water) is useful for submersed applications, limiting wind uplift, and safer installation in windy conditions.
Elongation at Break	ASTM D 7275	%	>60	Elongation capacity combined with tensile strength provides toughness allowing light traffic during installation and accommodating differential settlement in service.
Friction Angle (sand side)	NF EN 495-2	°	39.5	A high friction angle allows for safer installation and greater slope stability.
Cold Bending - Lowest Temperature	ASTM D 746	°C	-20	Cold bending relates to the ability to use and manipulate the geomembrane in cold conditions.
Water Permeability	ASTM E 96	m/s	< 6.10⁻¹⁴	The extremely low water permeability of a BGM aligns with the high standards typical of geomembranes.
Gas Permeability (Methane Transmission Rate)	ASTM D 1434-82	m^{3}/(m^{2}.d.atm)	< 2.10⁻⁴	A useful index for gas barrier applications.

== History ==
The earliest estimated use of bitumen dates back 40,000 years to the Paleolithic age and the historical use of bitumen as a waterproofing layer is extensive and well documented.

In 1926, successful experiments were conducted by the South Carolina Highway Department in which cotton fabric was installed on-site in combination with hot bitumen for road surface treatment. Continued experimentation and practical experience led to the development of prefabricated hessian woven fabrics with factory coated bitumen. Known as 'bithess' this material was made in significant quantities for rapid deployment in airfields and roads in World War II. By controlling the moisture content to maintain subgrade strength, this early geomembrane was credited by General William Slim to have played a significant role in the advance of the Burma campaign, a theater famous for its challenging jungle terrain and wet weather conditions.

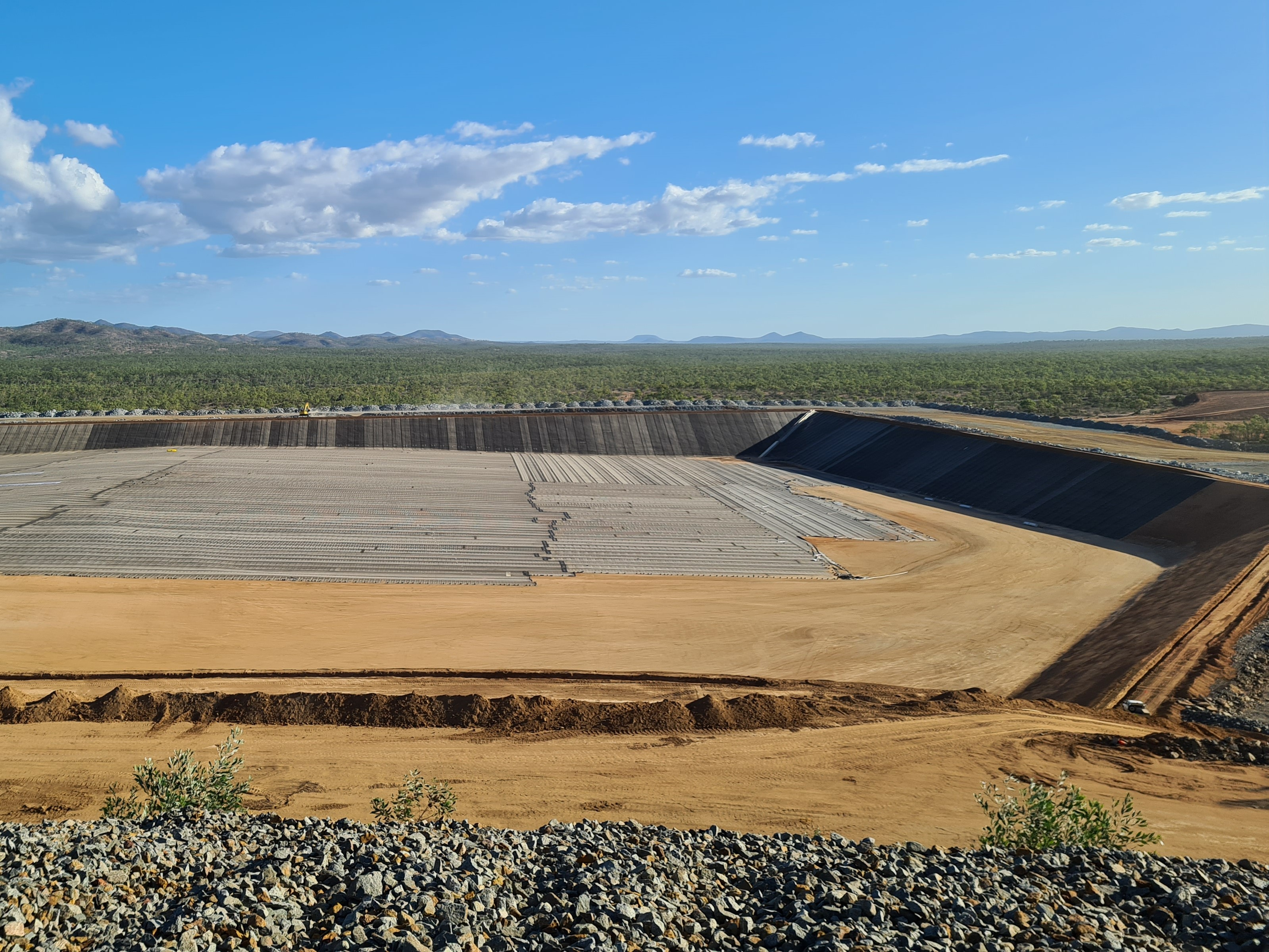
Bituminous geomembrane during installation on a mine tailings storage facility.

The earliest reported use of a BGM in the United States was reported by Daniel W. Kappes P.E. in 1973 at the Manhattan mine in Nevada, where a polypropylene geotextile was coated on-site with asphalt emulsion to create an impermeable layer for heap leach extraction. This application predates known European BGM applications by as much as one year and marked an early milestone in the use of geosynthetics in mining. Published literature describing the modern development of the bituminous geomembrane can be traced back to the first double-liner system conceived of in 1974 by geosynthetics pioneer, J.P. Giroud. This novel bituminous geomembrane was made by spraying hot bitumen in-situ onto a polyester geotextile. Soon after these early installations, factory manufactured BGMs were developed with factory impregnation of bitumen into the geotextile allowing a high standard of quality control. Spray applied BGMs went entirely out of favor by 1988.

== Welding ==
A propane torch is followed by a weighted roller for a typical torch weld of a bituminous geomembrane

Most seams are formed by torch welding. A typical crew consists of a welder and a helper who rolls the seam. The seam area is cleaned of sand and debris, the protective release film is removed, and the torch is applied between the layers to heat an overlapped area approximately 20 cm wide. The upper sheet is then rolled by a weighted roller to achieve intimate contact and extrude a continuous bitumen bead from the overlap. The typical welder operating temperature range cited for some products extends from about –35 °C to +40 °C, a larger operating window compared to other types of geomembranes, particularly for cold climates.

While torch welding is the most common practice, electrically powered hot-air-welding is an established alternative for applications where an open flame is undesirable.

== Quality control ==
Seam evaluation methods for geomembranes, including those applicable to bituminous geomembranes, are addressed in standard guides and practices that identify destructive, non-destructive, and electrical leak-location techniques.

=== Destructive testing ===
Shear testing of field seams is performed according to ASTM D7056 using a tensiometer with appropriate jaws. Minimum critical values can be specified with consideration for product grade and thickness (for example, a required minimum weld strength of 80% of the minimum parent material strength). Sampling frequencies such as one test per 150 lineal meters can be specified by the design engineer. Test locations are repaired by welding a patch of the parent BGM material over the test cut-out location.

=== Non-destructive testing ===
- Mechanical point stressing (probing with a round-tipped trowel after the bitumen has cooled) is often applied to check for separation; absence of a continuous bitumen bead receives particular attention.
- Air-lance testing (ASTM D4437) directs a jet of air at the seam edge; defects that allow the upper layer to lift are identified and repaired. This method is frequently specified for a high percentage of seams.
- Vacuum-box testing uses a transparent bell and soap solution; bubbles indicate leaks. This method is recommended for statistical inspection, especially at specific points such as triple overlaps.
- Ultrasonic testing places a probe across the seam (with coupling agent) after calibration; defects trigger additional testing between the failed point and the nearest passing points.

=== Electrical liner integrity survey ===
Water-lance methods can locate holes in exposed, emergent BGMs. Dipole methods can locate holes after the geomembrane has been covered by water or soil. These techniques require specialised equipment and operators and are typically applied over the full area when selected.

All defects identified by any method are marked, recorded, and repaired (usually by welding a patch extending at least 20 cm beyond the defect on all sides).

Partial List of Noteworthy BGM Projects
Project	Country	Type	Date Completed
Le Pont-de-Claix Water Reservoir	France	Water	1974
Ospedale Reservoir	Corsica	Water	1978
Parc des Chanteraines	France	Water	1982, 2020
Manche storage centre	France	Environmental Protection	1994
Ortolo Reservoir	Corsica	Water	1996
La Galaube Dam	France	Water	2000
Kildare Bypass	Ireland	Transportation	2003
Diavik Diamond Mine	Canada	Mining	2007
Kittilä mine	Finland	Mining	2007, 2008
Las Bambas copper mine	Peru	Mining	2012, 2014
Dolores mine	Mexico	Mining	2013, 2014, 2017, 2020
St. George Regional Airport	United States	Transportation	2019
Pench Right Canal	India	Water	2019, 2022
Stockton Mine	New Zealand	Mining	2022
