= Galaube Lake =

Reservoir in France

Lake Galaube
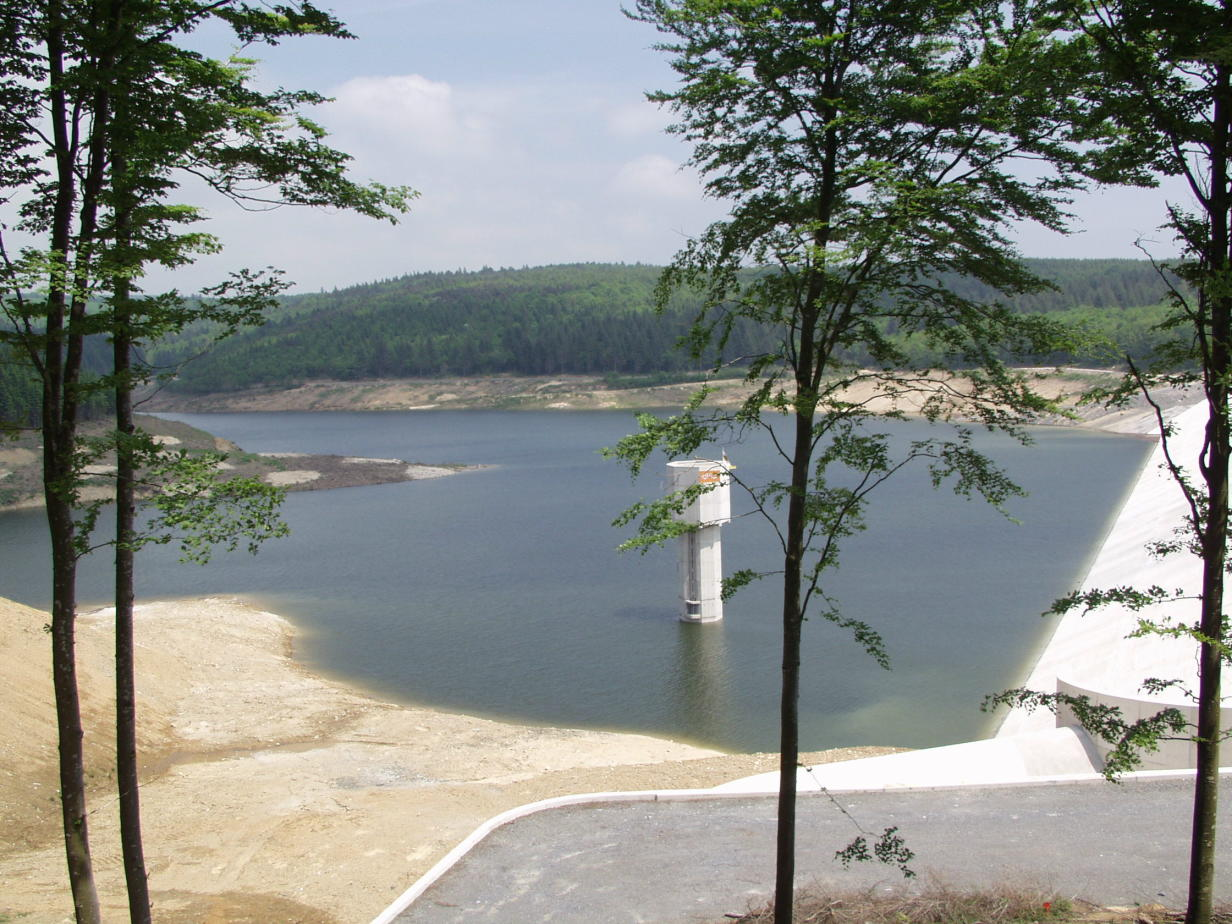

- Location in France
- Location: Occitanie
- Coordinates: 43.4244°N 2.2309°E
- Type: reservoir
- Primary inflows: Rougeanne River
- Primary outflows: Rougeanne River
- Basin countries: France
- Surface area: 161 acres (0.65 km^{2}; 0.252 mi^{2})
- Water volume: 8,000,000 m^{3} (0.0080 km^{3})
- Surface elevation: 723 m (2,372.0 ft)

The Galaube Lake is a reservoir on the Rougeanne River (also known as "l'Alzeau"), located between the Tarn (Arfons) and Aude (Lacombe) regions in Occitanie, France.

== Description ==
The idea of constructing a dam on the Rougeanne River dates back to the 18th century with the aim of improving the water supply for the Canal du Midi. Pierre-Paul Riquet, the designer of the canal, had envisioned building a water reservoir to better supply water to his creation through the Alzeau intake. However, it wasn't until 1985, during severe water shortages, that the project was considered. The construction was declared of public utility and general interest by decree on June 24, 1998. The La Galaube Dam itself was built from 1999 to 2001 at an altitude of 720m by the "Institution interdépartementale pour l'aménagement hydraulique de la Montagne Noire" (IIAHMN), established in 1948 among the departments of Aude, Haute Garonne, and Tarn. With a cost of 100 million francs, it supplies drinking water to several departments (Aude, Tarn, Haute-Garonne). It regulates the flow of the Montagne rigole and transfers water to the Camazes reservoir.

The La Galaube Dam is 43 meters high rockfill dam sealed with a bituminous geomembrane protected by cast-in-place concrete. Its core is constructed using micaschist rock and spans over 400 meters. Various monitoring devices, such as piezometers and tacheometers, ensure the dam's ongoing safety and performance.

== World War II ==
Near La Galaube dam is the site of a camp of the World War II resistance group (maquis) called the Corps Franc de la Montagne Noire. On 20 July 1944, the Germans bombed the camp, killing four men including Special Operations Executive (SOE) agent Henri Sevenet, known as Commandant Mathieu. A memorial nearby commemorates the event.

== Gallery ==
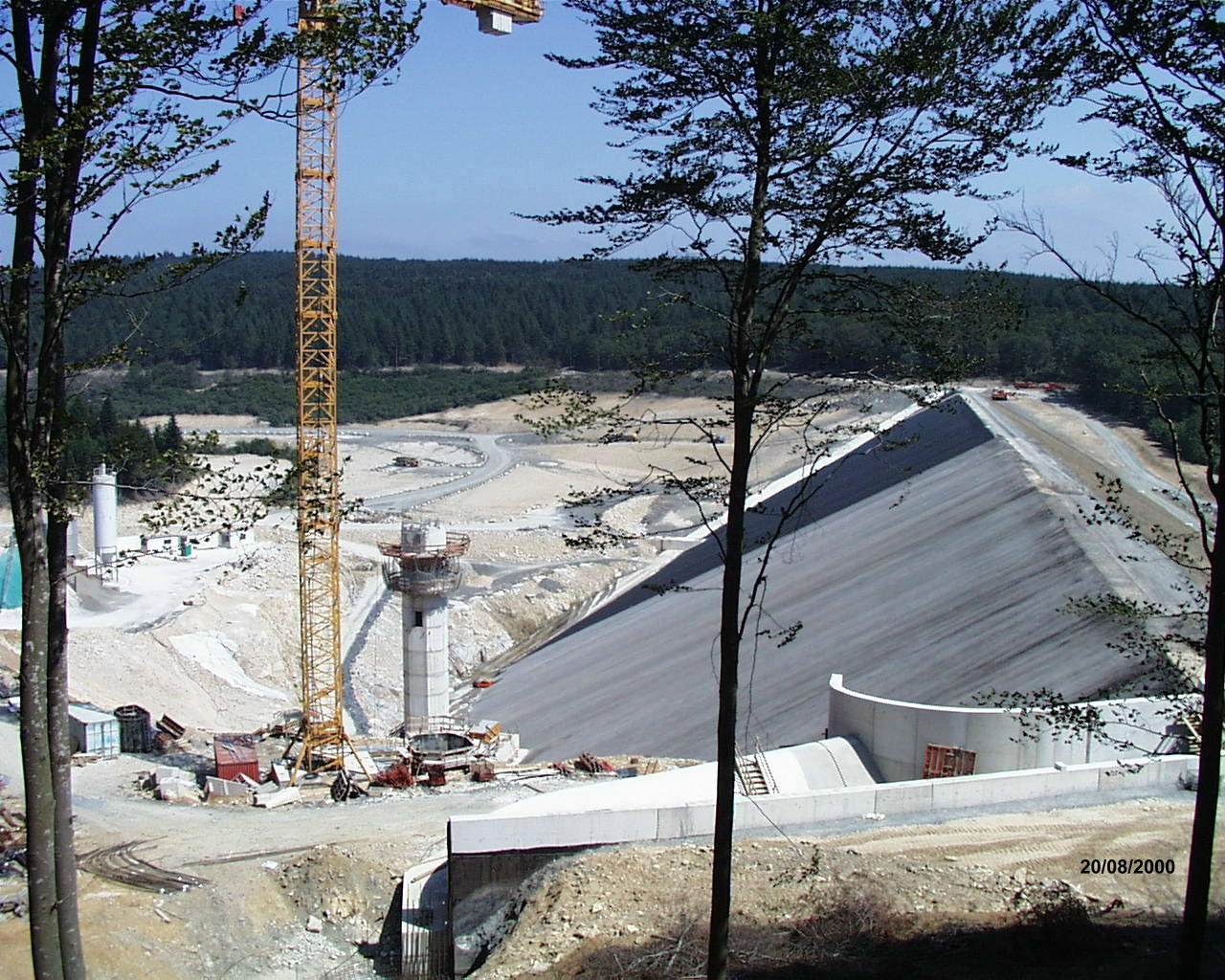
Construction site in August 2000

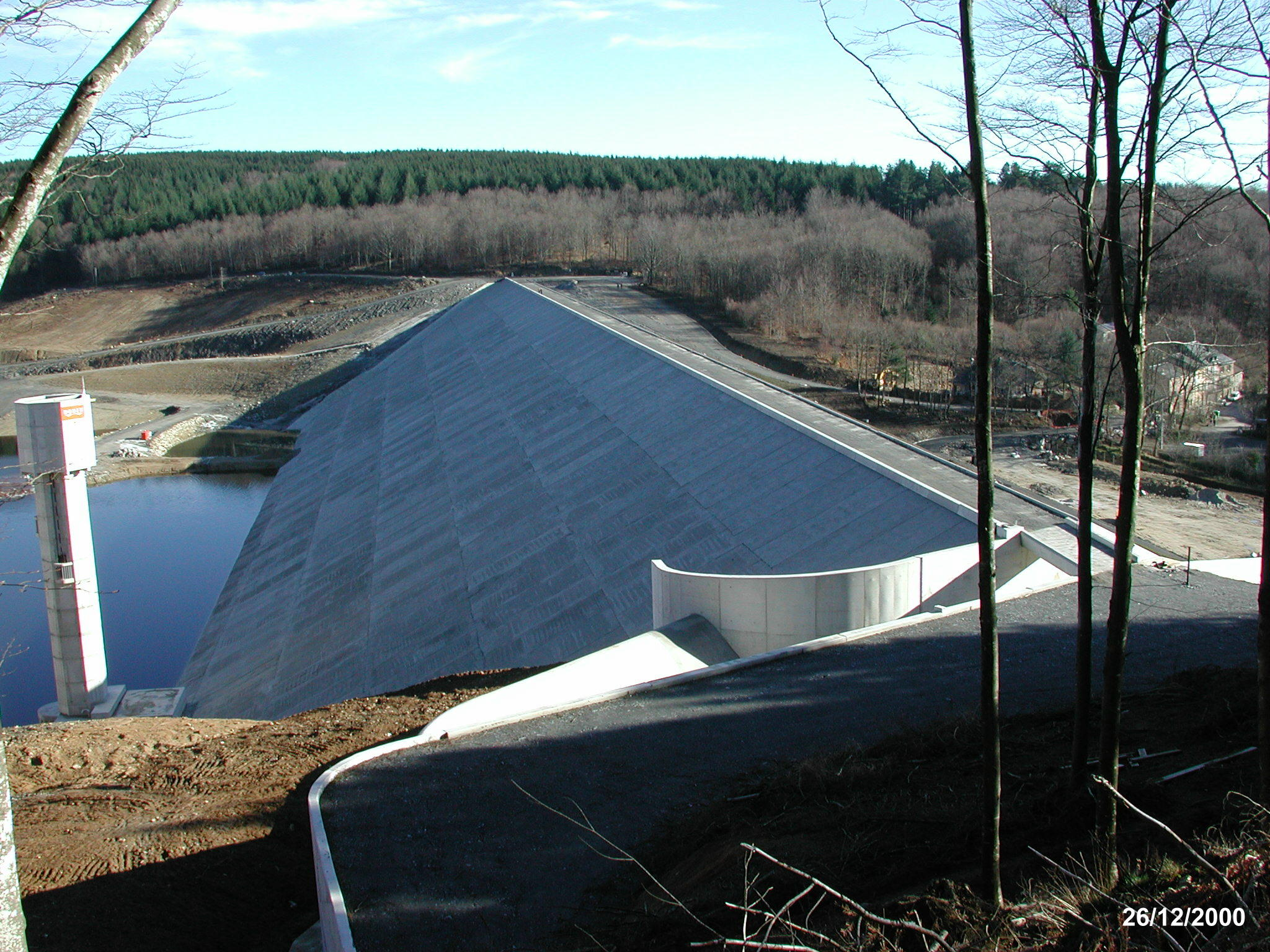
The dam

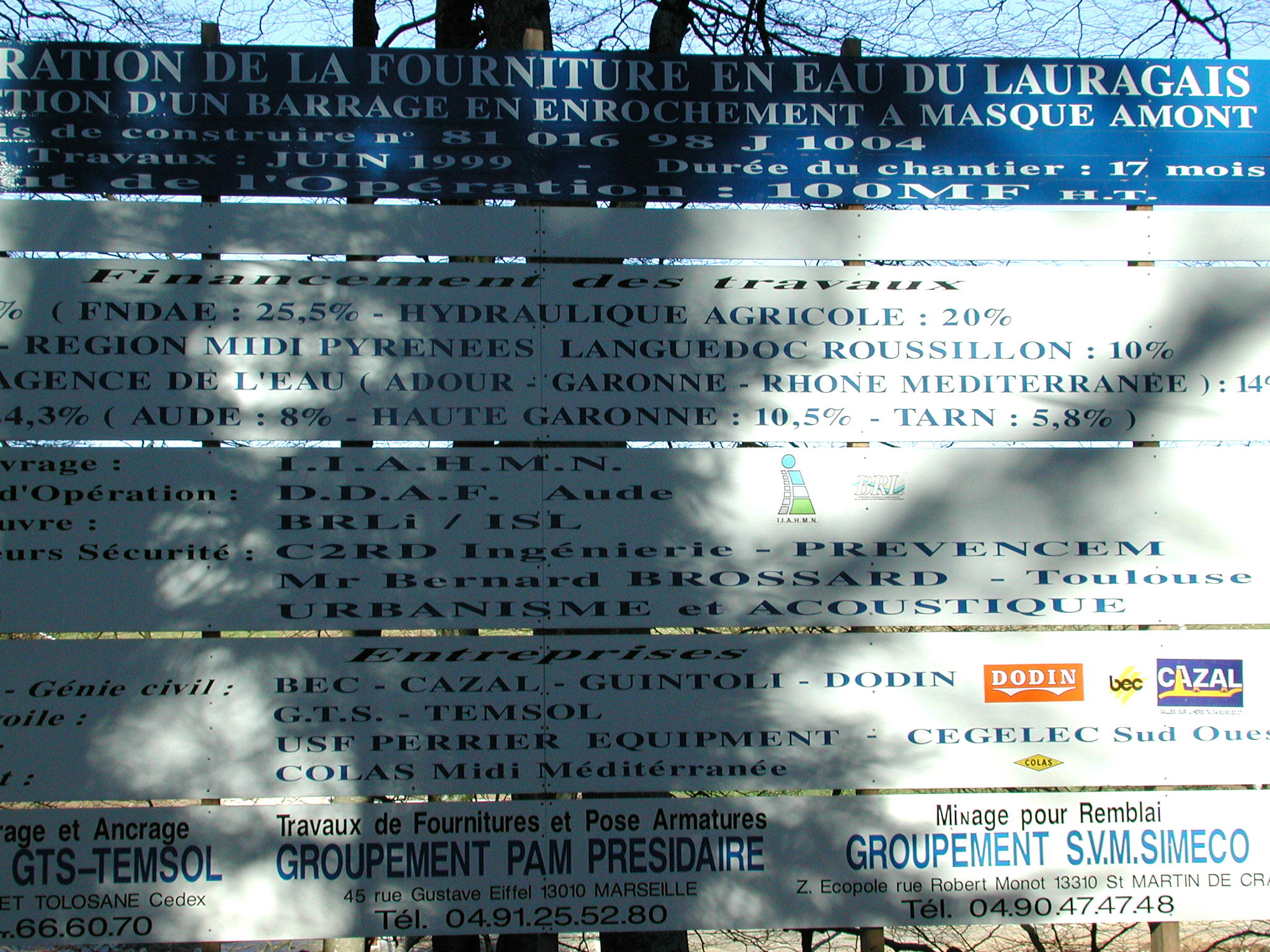
Construction panel

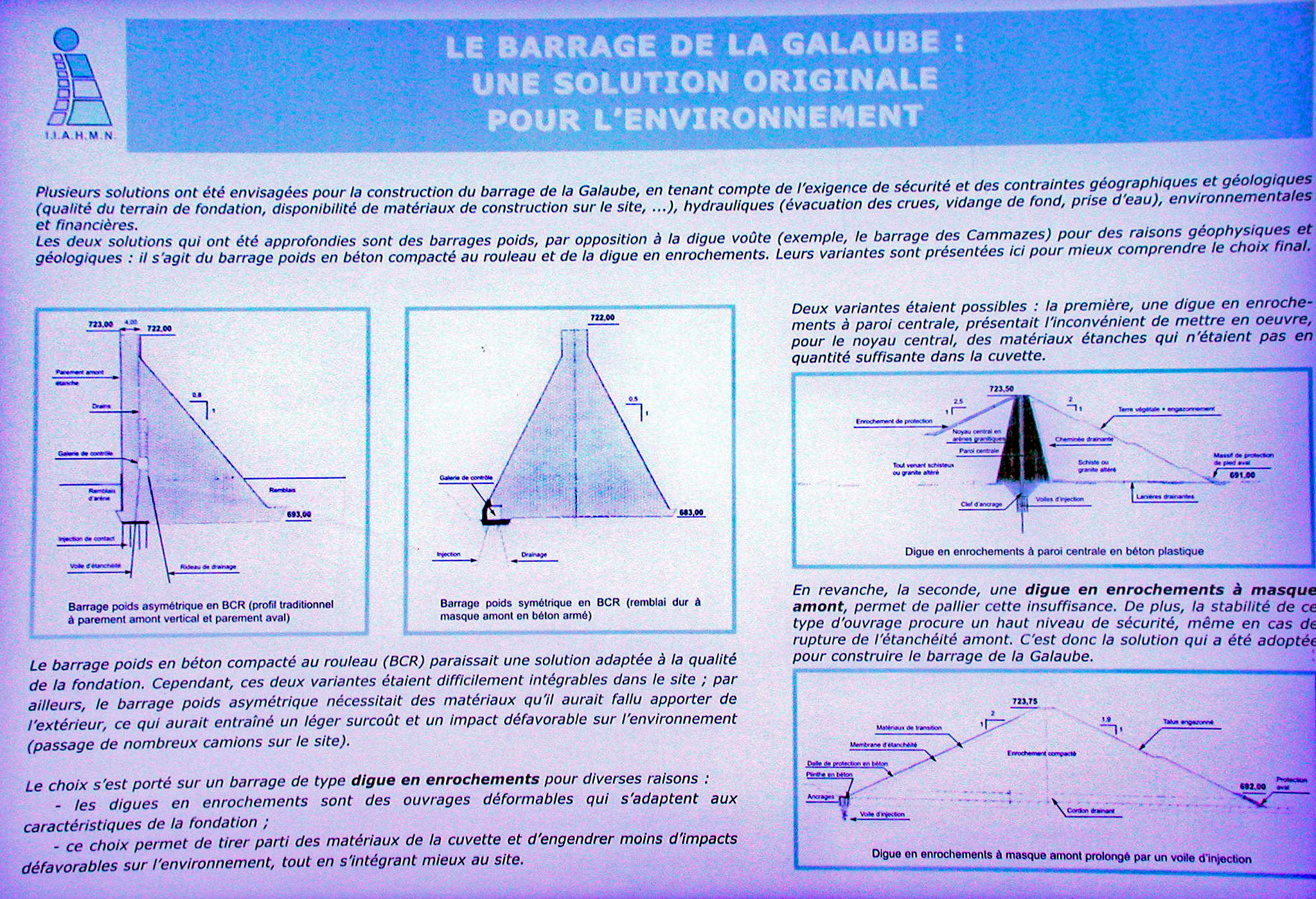
Information panel

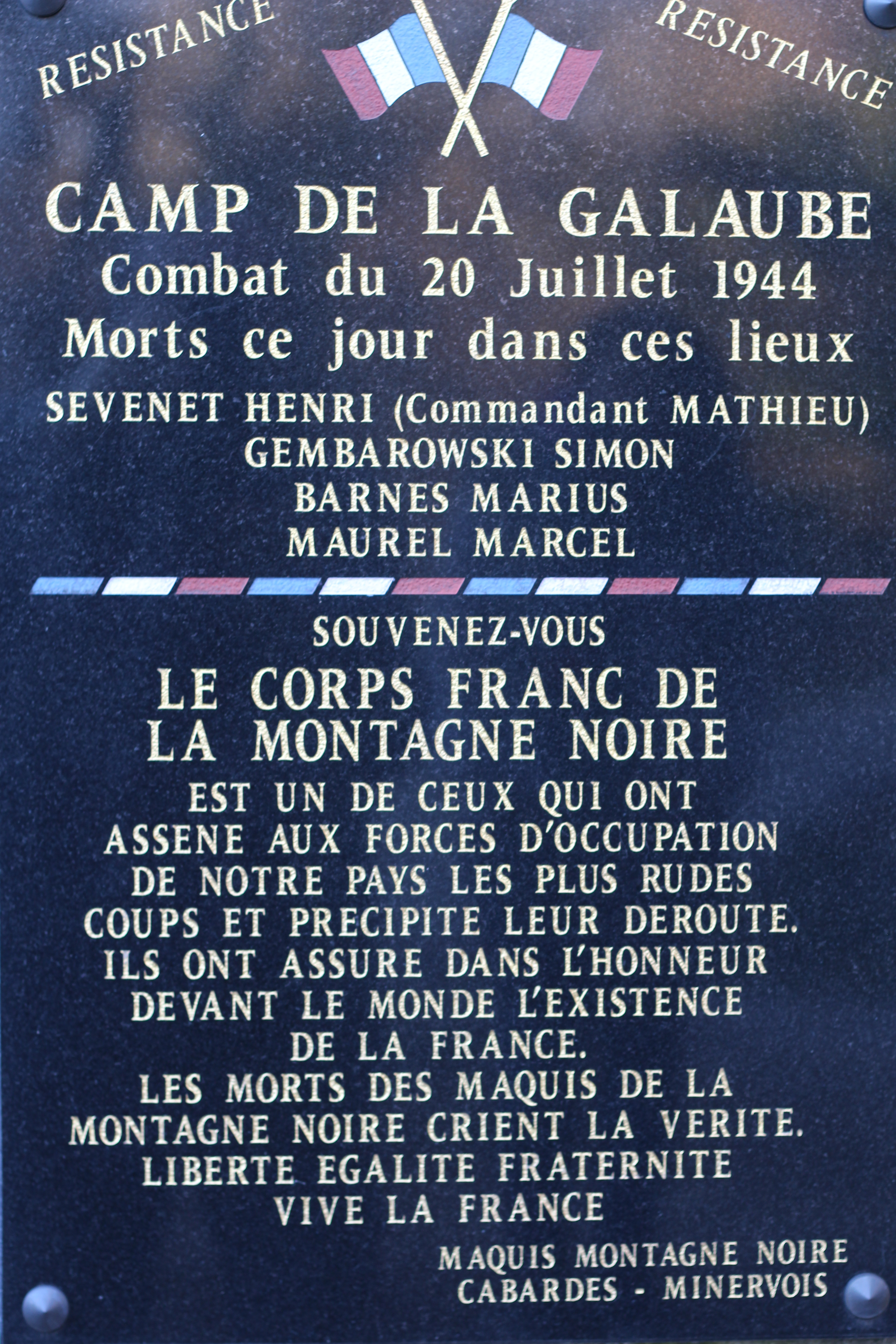
The memorial
