= Double liner =

A double liner is a fluid barrier system that incorporates two impermeable layers separated by a permeable drainage layer also called a leak detection layer. Typically the impermeable layers are made from geomembranes with a permeable layer in between. The uppermost layer is called the primary liner while the lower layer is called the secondary liner. This combination of layers is designed to prevent hydraulic head from building on the secondary liner, thereby limiting or preventing any permeation into the secondary liner. Due to the difficulty of constructing a single large scale impermeable layer without any defects, a double liner system is more robust, as it can deal with leakage through the primary liner. A double liner system is required by the United States EPA for landfill, surface impoundments, and waste piles.

== History ==
The first double geomembrane liner system was designed by geosynthetics pioneer J.P. Giroud, and installed in 1974 in Le Pont-de-Claix, France to serve as a water reservoir; this is still in service today. This system was composed of an early form of a bituminous geomembrane as the secondary liner, gravel as the drainage layer, and a butyl rubber geomembrane as the primary liner.
