= Polyane =

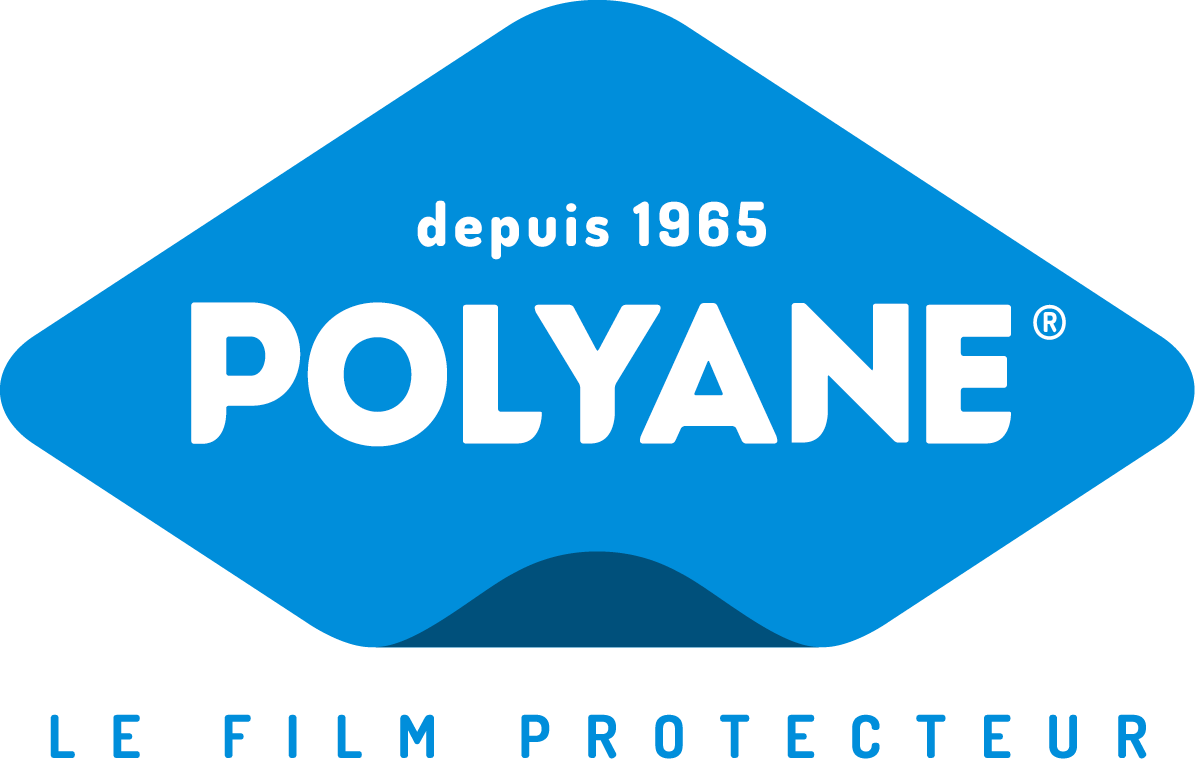
- Official logo of the brand
- Product type: Agriculture Construction Industry
- Current owner: Agripolyane
- Country: France
- Introduced: 1965; 61 years ago
- Markets: Plastic films
- Website: Polyane.fr

Polyane is a French trademark for insulating and waterproof plastic films used in construction, registered in 1965.

== History ==
Henri Piat, a mechanical enthusiast, collaborated with the owner of Société Plastique Soudé, J.-E. Mazuyer and started a new company, Company of Transformation of Synthesis Products, later known as Prosyn. Due to high investment cost, early technical challenges and expensive import licenses, the company struggled. After some time, the company moved to the station Châteaucreux in Saint-Etienne. After a downturn, in 1964, the company Société Nationale des Pétroles d'Aquitaine (SNPA), part of the Rhône-Alpes CRRA Research Centre, took a co-stake in Prosyn, with Lafarge. The two companies had different applications in mind; Lafarge aimed to improve the waterproofing of its cement bags, while SNPA aimed to develop and promote the use of polyethylene films. As part of these activities, Prosyn moved to Saint-Chamond.

After significant growth in the 60s and 70s, SNPA took over the entire capital of Prosyn and in the 1980s, the Société Nationale des Pétroles d'Aquitaine became the Elf Atochem group. Prosyn was then renamed to Prosyn Polyane, which combined with a marketing campaign led to the brand name, Polyane, in 1965. Products in which Polyane is used include stretch film, garbage bags and printing on plastic film, among other more niche applications.

In 1999, Prosyn Polyane had profitability issues and Elf Atochem aimed to sell off the brand and facilities. A successful sale was made to the Luxembourgian industrial group Verdoso, which also held a majority of the capital of Société de Production de Films Plastiques (SPFP). Prosyn Polyane was integrated into this organization. This re-oriented Prosyn Polyane to focus on the manufacture of film for industry and agriculture.

The company was bought again in October 2001 by the Adelpro group, a specialist in agricultural film, which also held two former competitors: Addem Plastiques (Firminy, Loire) and the former agricultural division of the British group Autobar Flexible France, which was then called Deltalène (Sainte Sigolène, Haute-Loire). Prosyn Polyane was subsequently renamed to Polyane. In July 2003, the group acquired Ribeyron (Sainte Sigolène, Haute-Loire).

The court of Saint-Étienne stopped activities of Adelpro, after it continued to struggle. Parts were sold to Ribeyron SAS, but the court allowed Deltalène and Polyane to fuse to a new company that continued operations under the name Prolène. The company remained under observation by a judicial agent and was ordered to wait for the court's agreement for each of its purchases. It was unable to remove itself from the verge of bankruptcy and under consultation of the court, Plastika Kritis purchased the failing companies. These were subsequently combined into a new company, Agripolyane, which holds the Polyane brand. The brand has since become widespread and is often used as a generic term to refer to specific types of plastics rather than the brand itself.

== Patents and trademarks ==
The Polyane trademark was registered in 1965. Since then, the company has changed its name from Prosyn Polyane to Agripolyane. It has also diversified its activity to include agriculture, construction, industry and geomembrane. The company wanted to protect its name by registering several dozen trademarks that it has created in its main markets, both nationally and internationally, with organizations specialized in intellectual property such as the INPI (France) or the OHIM (European Union). The company has also developed new products and filed patents to protect its innovations.
