= Corps Franc de la Montagne Noire =

French paramilitary unit

Corps franc de la Montagne noire
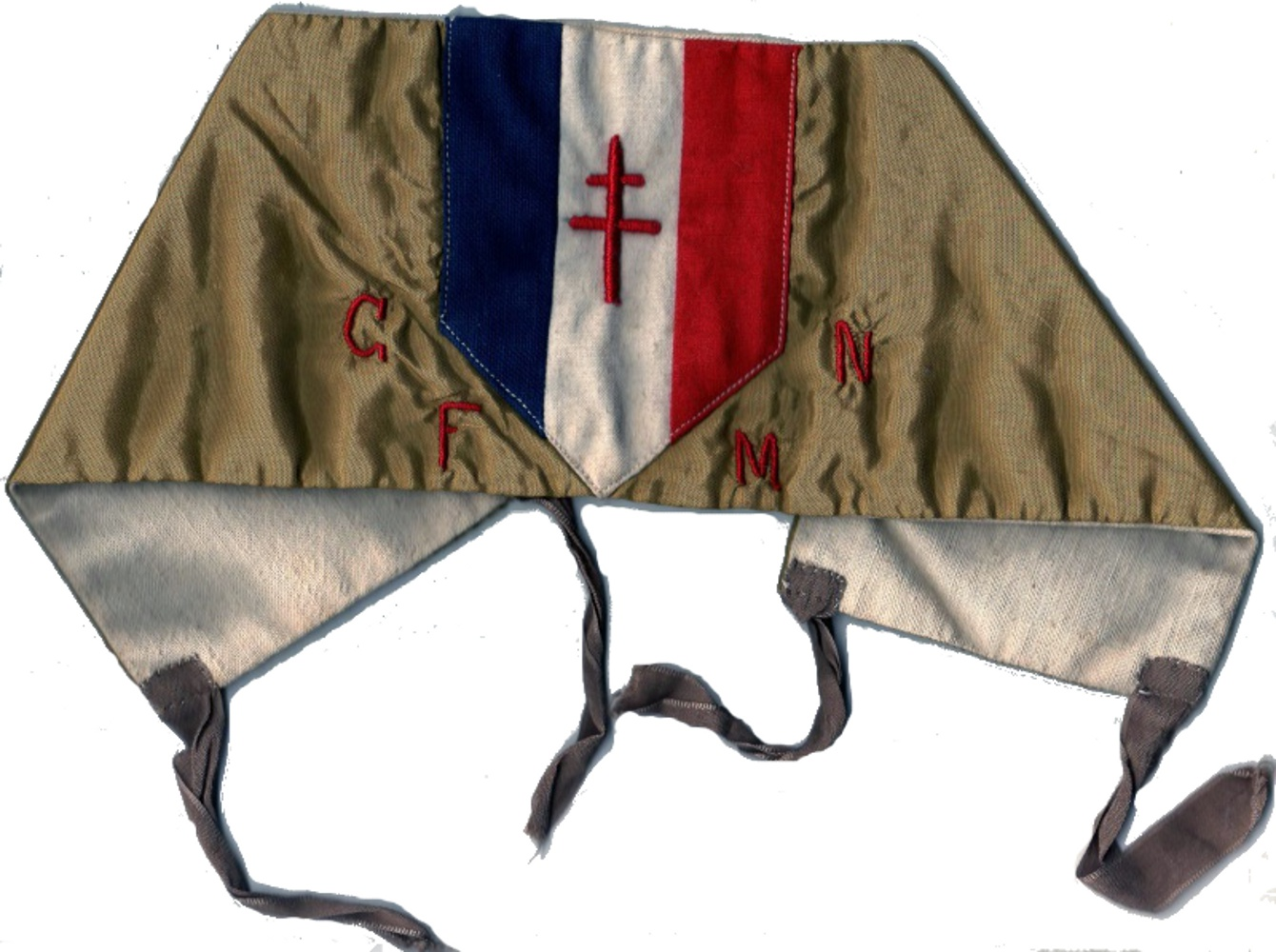
- Armband of the Corps Franc de la Montagne Noire
- Active: April – September 1944
- Country: France
- Allegiance: Free France
- Type: Paramilitary; Irregular military
- Size: 900
- Garrison/HQ: Montagne Noire
- Engagements: World War II: French Resistance

Commanders
- Notable commanders: Roger Mompezat; Henri Sevenet †; Antoine Carceler; Jouan de Kervenoaël; Major Richardson

The Corps Franc de la Montagne Noire (Free Corps of the Black Mountain) or C.F.M.N, was a fighting unit of the French resistance, during World War II. It was based in the mountainous area of the southwestern end of the Massif Central known as Montagne Noire (black mountain). Its mission was to prevent German troops from going to reinforce the landing fronts in Normandy and Provence.

== Background ==
Starting in October 1939, the French Army raised a number of Corps Franc, irregular military volunteer units, with the mission of carrying out ambush, raid and harassing operations. In 1942 the Secret Army of the French resistance was created. In February 1944 the combined forces of the Resistance became known as the Forces Françaises de l'Intérieur, and were placed under the command of General Marie-Pierre Kœnig. The Corps francs units were put under the command of Serge Ravanel. The Corps Franc de la Montagne Noire was set up on 20 April 1944 in Castres. It took its orders directly from London looking to federate the various local groups into a much larger force, in order to act behind German lines when the Allies finally landed in France.

== Formation ==
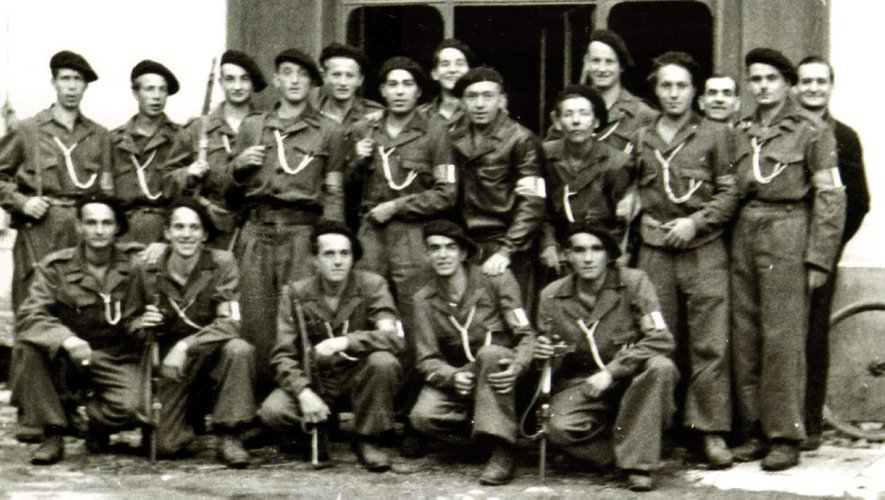
Members of the Corps Franc de la Montagne Noire

Special Operations Executive (SOE) agent Henri Sevenet, known as Commandant Mathieu, was parachuted in September 1943 in south-west France with the mission of organising a fighting unit to support the Provence landings. In Toulouse, he met Roger Mompezat, who had fought in the colonial infantry in 1918 and was known in the Resistance as Commandant Roger. Together with another SOE agent, Harry Despaigne, known as Major Richardson, a trained wireless operator, they organised the parachuting of weapons into the region.

In April 1943, under instructions from London, they set up a Free Corps in the region of Montagne Noire. Supplies are weapons start being sent from Algiers, the drop off is on the plateau of Pic de Nore.

They divided the group into 5 camps: Plo Del May, Fonbruno, Le Rietgé, Co de David, La Galaube. The Corps Franc de la Montagne Noire had at some point 21 nationalities represented. A military instructor, Bernard Jouan de Kervenoaël, known as Capitaine Saint-Michel, oversaw the training of the troops. Of three platoons, one was composed of Frenchmen, the second of Spanish Republicans and former Russian POWs who had been drafted into the Wehrmacht but deserted, and the third was a Jewish platoon. That last platoon was called the Trumpeldor platoon, its identity was highlighted by wearing blue-and-white shoulder flashes. (Note: Pierre Loeb aka Pierrot who had served in the French Air Force in 1940, decided, in the spring of 1944, to organised a Jewish maquis at L’Espinassier in the Tarn. Just before D-Day, the Jewish group was ordered to join the Corps Franc de la Montagne Noire, It was called the Trumpeldor platoon in honour of a Zionist hero killed in Palestine in 1920.)

== Political tension ==
The C.F.M.N was in direct contact with London through Richardson. Heavily armed and highly effective, the group attracted the envy and hostility of less well-provided maquis, who regarded them as little better than mercenaries working for the Allies, according to historian Robert Gildea, the group also refused to answer to the French Forces of the Interior and turned away communist volunteers. Three days after the Normandy landing the C.F.M.N had reached its maximum capacity and therefore started refusing volunteers.

== Operations ==
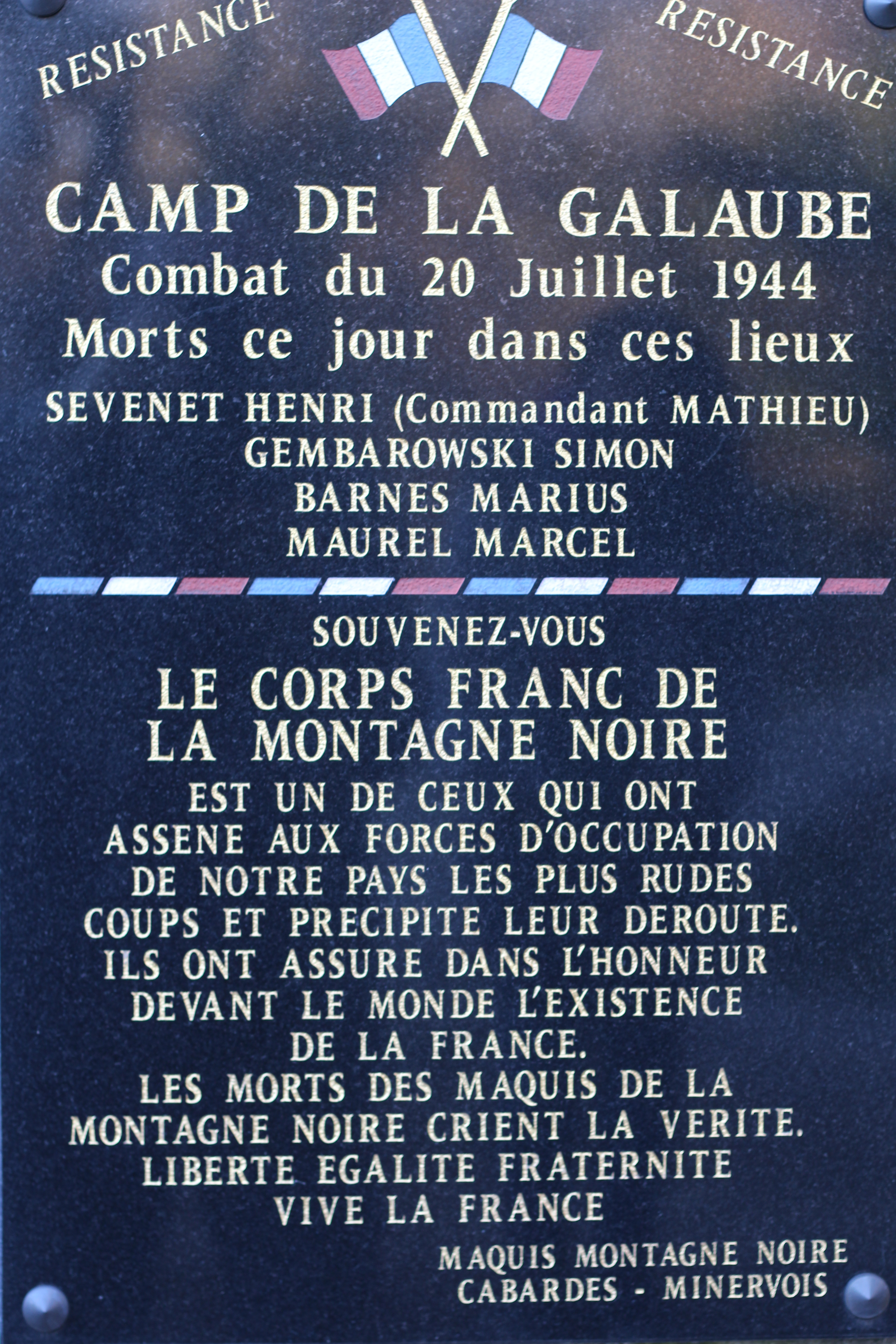
Memorial stele commemorating the men of the Corps franc de la Montagne Noire killed on 20 July 1944.

On 9 June, divided into three groups, they attacked a convoy for the first time. A few days later on 12 June, they attacked another convoy between Mazmet and Les Martyrs causing important damage. On 29 June, near Saissac, in a place called la Rouge, 7 German lorries with 30 men arriving from Lezignan were ambushed, eight German soldiers were killed, three were wounded; two of the maquisards were killed. On 14 July a group of 400 men marched defiantly through the little town of Revel, singing La Marseillaise before returning to the mountains; five days later on 19 July the Corps-franc attacked another German convoy, at Pont d'Alzau on Route Nationale 113, inflicting heavy casualties and taking prisoners. On 20 July, near Alzau, at the intersection known as La Prune, 15 members of the C.F.M.N attacked and stopped Panzers with grenades, fighting them for over two and a half hours.

As soon as they found out the location of the group, on 20 July 1944, the Germans launched an air assault in the early morning, bombarding the 5 camps, many were killed including one of the Commanders, Henri Sévenet. Right after the bombardment, the 11th Panzer Division was sent to eliminate the group together with a German army brigade of 1,500 men. The C.F.M.N was pushed back and separated into smaller units. On 23 August 1944, nine maquisards were killed near Pont de la Mouline. In September most of the fighters joined the First Army in the liberation of France.

== Honours ==
At the Galaube camp, a Memorial stele was erected in tribute to the resistance fighters of the Free Corps of the Black Mountain who died in combat on 20 July 1944. On it are the names of Henri Sevenet, known as Commandant Mathieu, and his three comrades killed the same day in combat, Simon Gembarowski, Marius Barnes and Marcel Maurel.

== Notes ==
Footnotes

Citations

== See also ==
- Maquis (World War II)
- Military history of France during World War II
