= Serge Ravanel =

French engineer, author, and WWII resistance fighter (1920–2009)

Colonel Serge Ravanel
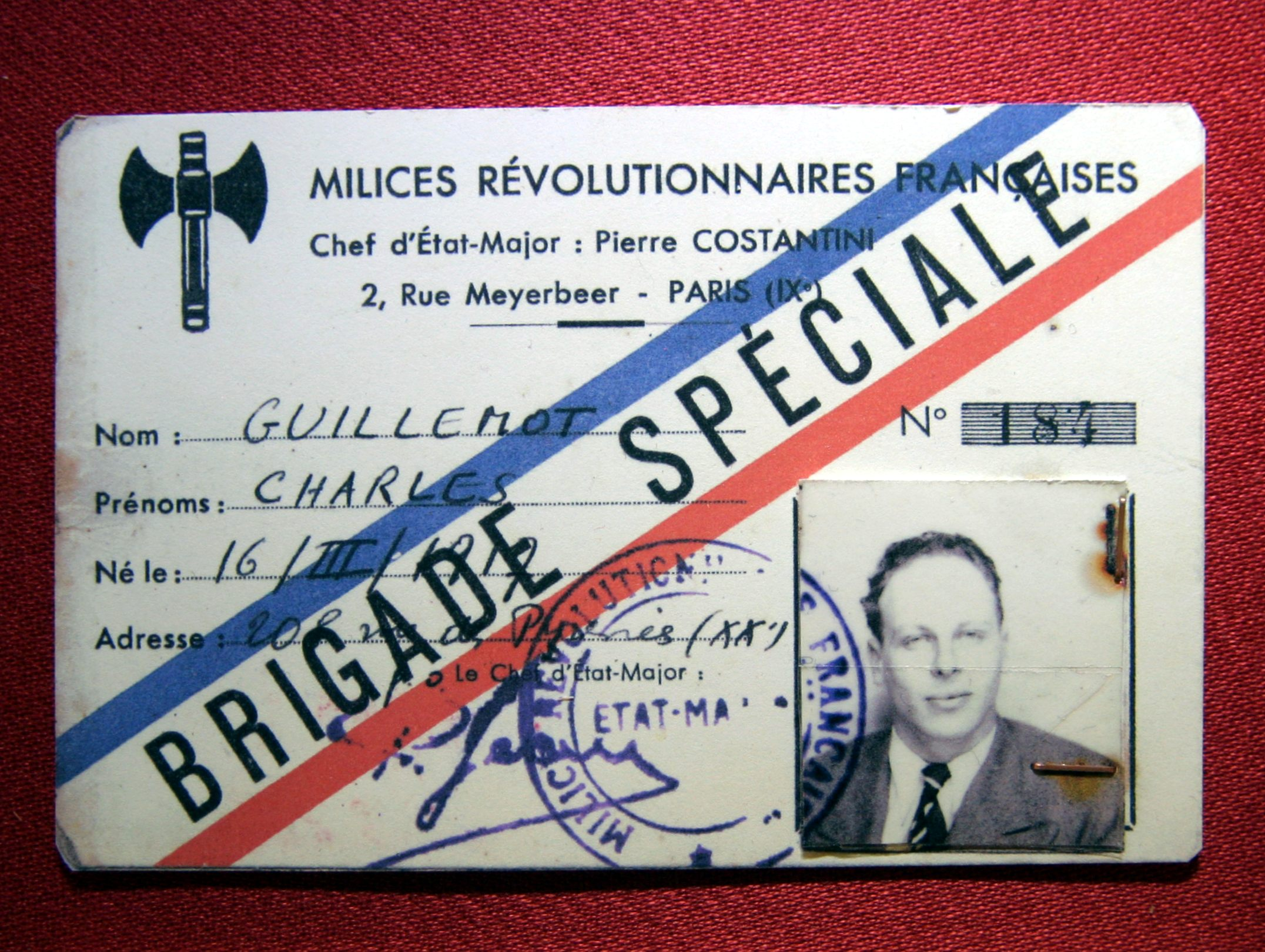
- Ravanel's false ID for the special brigade of the French Revolutionary Militias, under the pseudonym Charles Guillemot
- Nicknames: Serge Ravanel; Charles Guillemot
- Born: Serge Asher; 12 May 1920; Paris, France
- Died: 27 April 2009 (aged 88) Paris, France
- Allegiance: France
- Branch: French Forces of the Interior
- Rank: Colonel
- Conflicts: World War II
- Alma mater: École Polytechnique

Serge Ravanel (French pronunciation: [sɛʁʒ ʁavanɛl]; 12 May 1920 – 27 April 2009), born Serge Asher, was an engineer and author who became a prominent French Resistance fighter during World War II. He also operated under the alias Charles Guillemot.

== Biography ==
Asher was born in Paris, France on 12 May 1920. He was born to a wealthy family, of Jewish ancestry, his father was an engineer, and his mother was a Czech fashion journalist, who had settled in Paris for work. His stepfather was an export trader who worked in Africa.

Asher was educated at the Lycée Louis-le-Grand before going on to study polytechnics at École Polytechnique becoming an polyethnic engineer himself.

=== World War II ===
By September 1942, encouraged by Vichy ineffectiveness in the face of Nazi occupation and his own communist views, he began working with Libération-sud as a courier. He also began organizing other students into resistance and would become a key figure in the Resistance's work to liberate Lyon. He would adopt the alias Serge Ravanel, based on an alpine mountaineer, while working with them, a name that he would keep for the rest of his life.

By November 1943 Ravanel was serving as the national head of the Mouvements Unis de la Résistance in the southern zone. He worked closely with Raymond Aubrac and Maurice Kriegel-Valrimont in Toulouse, directing so many attacks that the city would be described as 'Toulouse la rouge.'

In the summer of 1944, Ravanel would meet with de Gaulle and General Kœnig in Toulouse over the creation of the French Forces of the Interior (FFI). General Kœnig would grant Ravanel rank of colonel within the FFI. Despite receiving this promotion, Ravanel criticized the resistance group Corps Franc de la Montagne Noire on political grounds, opposing them due to his communist leanings. Ultimately Ravanel would recall his meeting with de Gaulle as humiliating, claiming it was a political stunt to reign in FFI officers while celebrating career ones, with de Gaulle questioning Ravanel's personal right to wear the ribbon of the Order of Liberation which Ravanel claimed had been awarded him earlier.

Another bone of contention for de Gaulle was the high regard with which Ravanel held the Spanish maquisards who had led the liberation of Toulouse and other southern departments. Ravanel stated:

During the War of Spain our comrades had acquired the knowledge that we did not possess; they knew how to make bombs, they knew how to make ambushes, they had a profound knowledge of the technique of guerrilla warfare. I must also say that they conquered us with their valour, their fraternity, their gentleness, their self-denial. They were, for us, "brothers in combat"

Ravanel resigned from the army in 1950.

Ravanel died on 27 April 2009 in Paris at the Val-de-Grâce military hospital.

== Legacy ==
Ravanel authored L'Esprit de Résistance, a biographical work describing his experience as a member of the French Resistance, which was published in 1995.
