= Jean-Pierre Giroud =

French geotechnical engineer

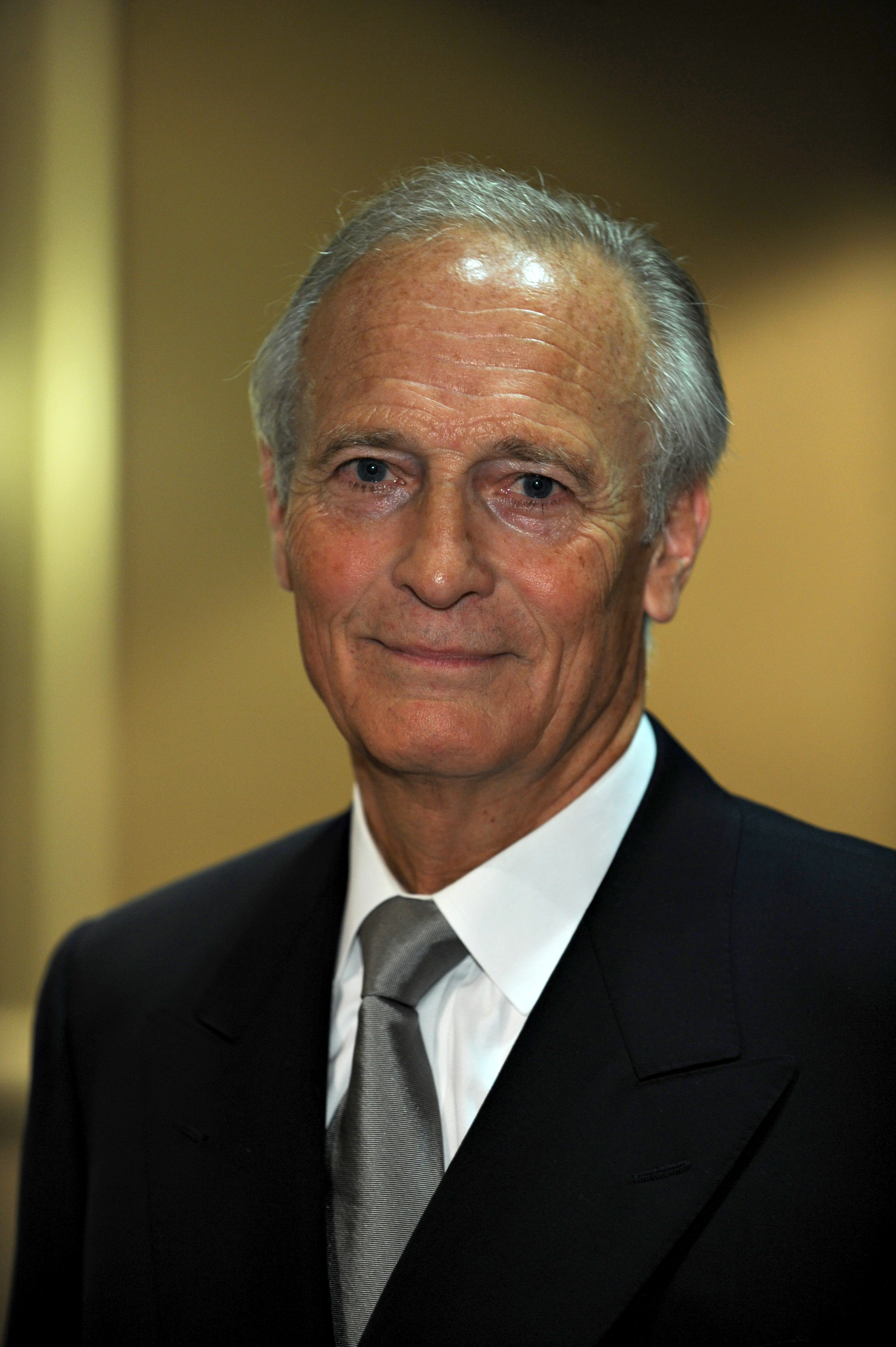
- Born: March 13, 1938 (age 88)
- Education: Ecole Centrale Paris

Jean-Pierre Giroud (born March 13, 1938) is a French geotechnical engineer and a pioneer of geosynthetics since 1970. In 1977, he coined the words "geotextile" and "geomembrane", thus initiating the "geo-terminology". He is also a past president of the International Geosynthetics Society, member of the US National Academies, and Chevalier de la Légion d'Honneur.

== Education and career ==
Giroud is a civil engineer from Ecole Centrale Paris, and he got his Ph.D. in geotechnical engineering at the University of Grenoble. He has been president of the International Geosynthetics Society (1986–1990) and director of the Geotextiles and Geomembranes Group of Woodward Consultants (1978–1983). He was the co-founder and chairman of the board of GeoSyntec Consultants (1983–2001), of which he is now chairman emeritus. He was chairman (two terms) of the Technical Committee on Geosynthetics of the International Society for Soil Mechanics and Geotechnical Engineering (ISSMGE). He was also co-founder and chairman of the editorial board of the two main technical journals in the field of geosynthetics engineering, Geotextiles and Geomembranes (1984–1994) and Geosynthetics International (1994–2021). Giroud is now an independent consultant since 2001.

== Research ==
Initially (1962-1978), Dr. Giroud was a researcher at the University of Grenoble while teaching geotechnical engineering at the Grenoble University Institute of Technology and the Ecole Nationale des Travaux Publics in Lyon. Since the early 1970s, Dr. Giroud has developed a number of design methods used in geosynthetics engineering. Examples of the design methods he developed include: liner leakage evaluation, drainage systems, leachate collection and leakage detection layers, liner system stability, reinforcement of liners and soil layers overlying voids, geomembrane stress and strain analysis, evaluation of geomembrane properties, connections between geomembranes and rigid structures, geomembrane uplift by wind, and geotextile filters. Giroud has been dubbed "the father of geosynthetic lining systems", and Richardson stated that “Understanding and properly implementing the basic leakage equations developed by Giroud is key to the proper design of surface impoundments. . . Rarely does a single engineer creatively affect a particular application as much as he has.” Giroud is also co-author with Professor J. Han of the Giroud-Han method for the design of unpaved roads stabilized with geosynthetics used world wide.

== Publications ==
Giroud is the author of more than 450 publications. Examples include:

- Tables pour le calcul des fondations, Dunod publisher, Paris, Vol. 1 (1972) 360 pages, Vol. 2 (1972) 505 pages, Vol. 3 with Tran-Vo-Nhiem and J.P. Obin (1972) 445 pages.
- Tassement et stabilité des fondations superficielles, Presses Universitaires de Grenoble (1975) 720 pages.
- Geosynthetics Case Histories, BiTech publisher (1993) with G.P. Raymond, 277 pages.
- Geosynthetics Bibliography, Volume 1, IFAI Publishers, (1993) with cooperation of J.F. Beech and A. Khatami,781 pages.
- Geosynthetics Bibliography, Volume 2, IFAI Publishers, (1994) with cooperation of J.F. Beech, A. Khatami and K. Badu-Tweneboah, 940 pages.
- Design of Geomembrane Applications, Geosynthetics International, 2, 6 (1995) 285 pages.
- Liquid Migration Control Using Geosynthetic Liner Systems, Geosynthetics International, 4, 3-4 (1997) 251 pages.
- Liquid Collection Systems, Geosynthetics International, 7, 4-6 (2000) 320 pages.
- Filter Criteria, pp. 221-259, in Jubilee Volume, 75th Anniversary of K. Terzaghi’s “Erdbaumechanik”, H. Brandl, Editor, Reports of the Institute for Soil Mechanics and Geotechnical Engineering, Technical University of Vienna, Austria, (2003) 378 pages.
- Géomembranes, Techniques de l’ingénieur, C5429-5430, C5435-5438 (2015) 111 pages.

== Innovation ==
- In 1973, presentation of the double liner concept, which has been adopted as the basic design for hazardous waste landfills.
- In 1989, quantification of the rate of leakage associated with composite liners, which have been adopted for municipal solid waste landfills.
- In 1995, publication of a detailed design method for the resistance of geomembranes liners to uplift by the wind, which made it possible to construct landfill covers with geomembranes.

== Project design ==
Giroud has worked on projects of dams, canals, reservoirs, waste storage landfills and mine tailings ponds in North and South America, Europe, Africa, Middle East, Far East, Australia and New Zealand where he provided design and construction assistance. Examples include:

- Valcros Dam, France (1970) where a nonwoven geotextile was used for the first time as a filter and where a geotextile filter was used for the first time in a dam.
- Pont-de-Claix Reservoir, France (1974) where a double-liner with two geomembranes and a leakage detection layer was used for the first time.
- Proton Decay Experiment Underground Reservoir, Lake Erie, Ohio, United States (1980) where an entirely geosynthetic double liner system (with two geomembranes and a geosynthetic leakage detection layer) was used for the first time.
- Sulfuric Acid Reservoirs, Arlit Uranium Mine, Niger (1981) where a strategy for evaluating the durability of PVC geomembranes was developed.
- New-Milford Waste Disposal Landfill, Connecticut, USA (1987), where the stability of the landfill cover was evaluated with laboratory tests and full-scale tests.
- Delaware Solid Waste Authority Landfill, Sussex County, Delaware, USA (1998), first landfill with an exposed geomembrane cover designed to resist uplift by wind.
- Assessment of Soil Reinforcement Products and Systems for the Geotechnical Engineering Office of the Government of Hong Kong (1999-2008).
- Tekapo Hydroelectric Canal, New Zealand (2011-2013), where an original design method was used to evaluate the resistance of a geomembrane lining to seismic activity.

== Lectures ==
Giroud was the keynote lecturer at 2nd, 3rd, 4th, 5th and 8th International Conferences on Geosynthetics (1982, 1986, 1990, 1994, and 2006). He was also a keynote lecturer at the Geosynthetics 99 Conference in 1999, at the Second European Conference on Geosynthetics in 2000, at the First PanAmerican Conference on Geosynthetics in 2008 and the Third African Regional Conference on Geosynthetics (2017). In addition, Giroud delivered the following prestigious lectures:

- Jack Hilf Lecture, Bureau of Reclamation/Colorado State University, 1999
- Kersten Lecture, The University of Minnesota, 1999
- Vienna Terzaghi Lecture, Osterreichischen Ingenieur- und Architekten Vereins, 2005
- Mercer Lecture, International Society for Soil Mechanics and Geotechnical Engineering / International Geosynthetics Society, 2005-2006
- Terzaghi Lecture, American Society of Civil Engineers, 2008
- Victor de Mello Lecture, International Society for Soil Mechanics and Geotechnical Engineering, 2016
- Széchy Lecture, Magyar Geotechnikai Egyesület / Magyar Mérnöki Kamara Geotechnikai Tagozata, 2017
- Koerner Lecture, Geosynthetic Materials Association, 2023

== Honors and awards ==
- Prix des Jeunes, Société des Ingénieurs et Scientifiques de France, 1972
- President's Award of the Industrial Fabrics Association International (IFAI), 1983.
- In 1994, the International Geosynthetics Society has named his highest award "The Giroud Lecture", "in recognition of the invaluable contributions of Dr. J.P. Giroud to the technical advancement of the geosynthetics discipline".
- Doctor Honoris Causa of the Technical University of Bucharest, Romania, 2007.
- Elected to the US National Academy of Engineering (2009) "for pioneering research in geosynthetics engineering and its practical application in civil/geotechnical engineering".
- Appointed in 2010 Chevalier in the Order of the Légion d’Honneur.
- Prix Felix, category Leader, Ecole Centrale Paris, 2013.
