= Henri Sevenet =

Henri Sevenet (1914–1944), code names Rodolphe and Mathieu, was an agent of the clandestine British Special Operations Executive (SOE) during World War II. The purpose of SOE was to conduct espionage, sabotage, and reconnaissance in countries occupied by Nazi Germany or other Axis powers. SOE agents allied themselves with resistance groups and supplied them with weapons and equipment parachuted in from England. Sevenet joined the French Resistance in 1941. He joined the SOE in 1942 and undertook two missions to France. In 1944 Sevenet, known as Commandant Mathieu, supplied a large resistance group called the Free Corps of Black Mountain (CFMN). After the Allies invaded France on June 6, 1944, Sevenet's group attacked German supply lines. The Germans launched a counter attack on the CFMN and killed Sevenet in a bombing raid on 20 July 1944.

== Early life ==
Henri Sevenet was born 3 November 1914 at Chédigny, Indre-et-Loire, France. He was the son of Louis Sevenet, killed in 1915 in World War I, and Marthe Dauprat. He grew up in the Chateau de Breuil, part of which dates to the 15th century. His mother Marthe lived there during World War II and was involved in the resistance, the chateau serving as a safe house for SOE agents and resisters evading capture.

Sevenet was employed by an insurance company when World War II began. In the French army he was taken prisoner on 18 May 1940 by the Germans, but escaped that same day. Two days later he was again captured but escaped again at the end of October. Fleeing to Lyon, he became employed by Citroen as a buyer of auto parts which gave him the opportunity to travel around the region. In Lyon, he met SOE agent Virginia Hall and through her he came into contact with Philippe de Vomécourt, a childhood friend. De Vomécourt recruited Sevenet into the French Resistance in May 1941. As a "letterbox", Sevenet received and delivered messages for de Vomécourt's Autogiro network and helped with the installation of SOE's first wireless transmitter in France. When Philippe's brother, Pierre de Vomécourt, was captured by the Germans on 25 April 1942, Sevenet fled France to avoid capture and to be trained as an agent by SOE. He crossed the Pyrenees to Spain on foot and arrived in London on 19 July 1942.

Sevenet was described by author Charles Glass as having a Charlie Chaplin moustache, wearing thick glasses, and looking like a professor, but being "extremely courageous" and a "ruthless clandestine operator".

== Special Operations Executive ==
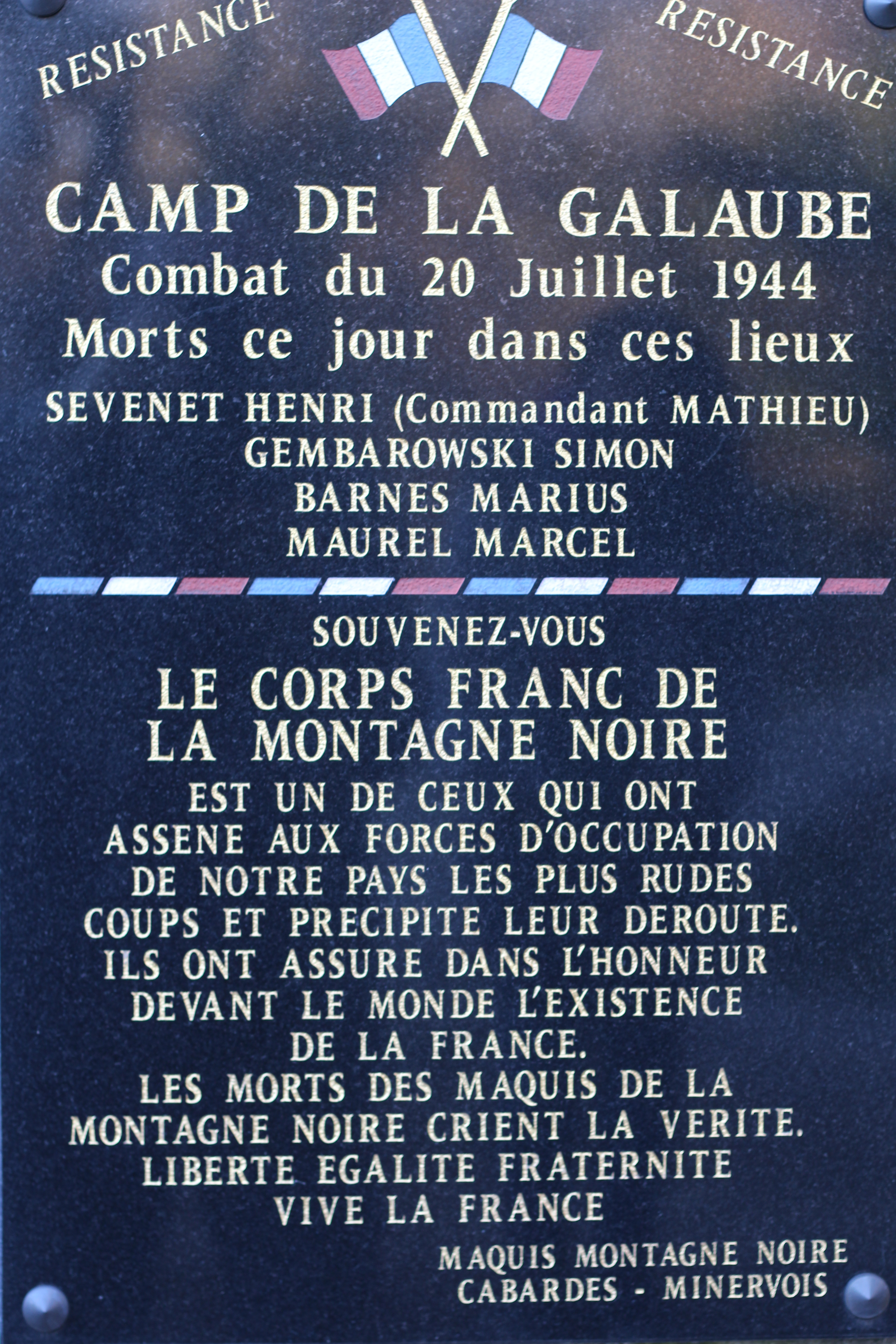
Memorial for the CFMN and Sevenet

Already experienced in clandestine work, Sevenet was given a brief training course in demolition and in late August 1942 he parachuted back into France, landing near Chedigny, his childhood home. Sevenet was given three tasks for his mission: (1) sabotage the railroad from Tours to Poitiers; receive arms and equipment parachuted into France; and (3) report to Phillipe de Vomécourt and persuade him to return to England. De Vomécourt declined to return to England and was captured in November 1942 (although he later escaped). Sevenet's wireless operator, Brian Stonehouse, was captured in October 1942 although his courier, Denise Bloch, remained free. Sevenet barely escaped capture himself as he was standing near J.M Aron, Vomécourt's assistant, when Aron was arrested in the Lyon railroad station in November 1942.

Sevenet journeyed to Marseille in November 1942 to find a new wireless operator. He met newly arrived SOE agent George Starr who was sent to France as an assistant for Sevenet. With SOE networks dismantled by the arrests, Severnet told Starr to go to Agen to help the resistance in that region. Starr chafed under Sevenet's supervision. Sevenet and Starr made plans to liquidate Denise Bloch as they considered her a security risk, but Starr instead sent her to England in January 1943 with messages for SOE. Starr, who became one of SOE's best agents, became suspicious of Sevenet because of Sevenet's contacts with a known Gestapo agent. Starr's lengthy survival as an SOE agent was perhaps partially due to his suspicions of everyone, even other SOE agents. He broke off contact with Sevenet.

In February 1943, Sevenet was told he was targeted for arrest by the Gestapo. He fled to England, crossing the Pyrenees on foot. He parachuted back to France on 15 September 1943 with a new code name and, for security reasons, orders to avoid contact with de Vomécourt. He was assigned to work in a new area for him, Aude department in southern France, with the city of Carcassonne as his base, as the head of the Detective network. He was joined shortly by wireless operator, Harry Despaigne. Sevenet, known as Commandant Mathieu, and Despaigne developed the resistance "into an efficent body of transport saboteurs and armed the thousand-strong Corps Franc de la Montagne Noire (CFMN).

The CFMN was controversial as it was overtly anti-communist and independent of Charles de Gaulle's umbrella organization for the resistance called the French Forces of the Interior (FFI). A communist critic said the CFMN was "a mercenary gang in the pay of international capitalism." Historian H.R Kedward said the CFMN was a body of several hundred men who kept thousands of German troops in the southwest [of France]" rather than allowing them to contest the Allied invasion of France on 6 June 1944. The CFMN began attacks on German convoys shortly after the invasion of France. On 20 July the Germans responded with a large offensive against the CFMN which involved an estimated 4,000 soldiers plus aircraft. Sevenet was killed by a bomb dropped by one of the German airplanes near present-day Galaube Lake. The Germans tossed his body onto a manure pile. The CFMN forces found the body four days later and sent his ring and a rosary to his mother With the German assault, the CFMN broke up into smaller groups and continued to harass the Germans until late August when the Germans withdrew from the area.

Sevenet was honored by France with the Croix de Guerre and the Legion d'honeur. His name is inscribed on the Valencay SOE Memorial
