= Frank Brian Mercer =

- Born: 22 December 1927; Blackburn, Lancashire, United Kingdom
- Died: 22 November 1998 (aged 70)
- Other name: Brian Mercer
- Occupations: Engineer, inventor, and businessman
- Known for: Inventing the Netlon process and developing Tensar geogrids
- Notable work: Netlon and geogrid reinforcement technology

Frank Brian Mercer, known as Brian Mercer (22 December 1927 – 22 November 1998) was a British engineer, inventor and businessman. He is best known for the invention of the Netlon process, which he developed and turned into a business.

== Early life ==
He was born in Blackburn, Lancashire. His mother worked as a cotton spinner and his father was an office worker at a cotton mill who rose to become the mill owner. Brian Mercer (he was known by his middle name) was educated at the Queen Elizabeth's Grammar School, Blackburn. The death of his father in 1952 resulted in Brian Mercer taking control of the Pioneer Mill at the age of 21.

== Career ==
In the 1950s, he invented the Netlon process, in which plastics are extruded into a net-like process in one stage, winning the Queen's Award for Technological Achievement. Having failed to sell his invention to Imperial Chemical Industries he converted the Pioneer Mill from a cotton mill to the manufacturing base for Netlon (and subsequently Tensar).

With his inspiration, leadership and drive, he founded Netlon Ltd in 1959 to manufacture the products but most importantly to commercialise the concept. Throughout Brian Mercer's career, he strongly believed in the importance of cooperative research and development through instigating discussion and debate through international commercial and technical conferences.

In 1978 he became a Fellow of the Institute of Materials and the second person to receive their Prince Philip Award. He was elected a Fellow of The Textile Institute in 1973 and in 1988 it bestowed on him an Honorary Fellowship.

Modern Tensar geogrids were invented by Dr. Mercer in the late 1970s and early 1980s for the construction industry to provide stabilisation and reinforcement with the underlying concept of simplicity, flexibility and strength. They are now used throughout the world for soil stabilization applications.

== Recognition ==
In 1981 he received the OBE and in 1984 was made a Fellow of the Royal Society. He made a bequest to the Royal Society to establish the Brian Mercer Award for Feasibility, which is given to allow researchers to investigate the technical and economic feasibility of commercialising an aspect of their scientific research.

His portrait, painted by Salvador Dalí in 1973, is now owned by the Royal Society.
