= Geogrid =

Synthetic material used to reinforce soils and similar materials

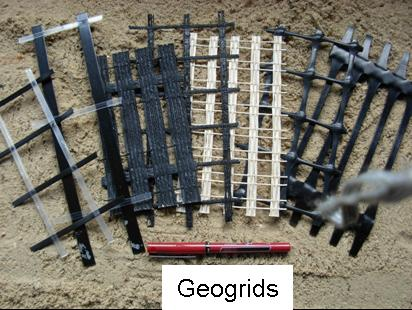

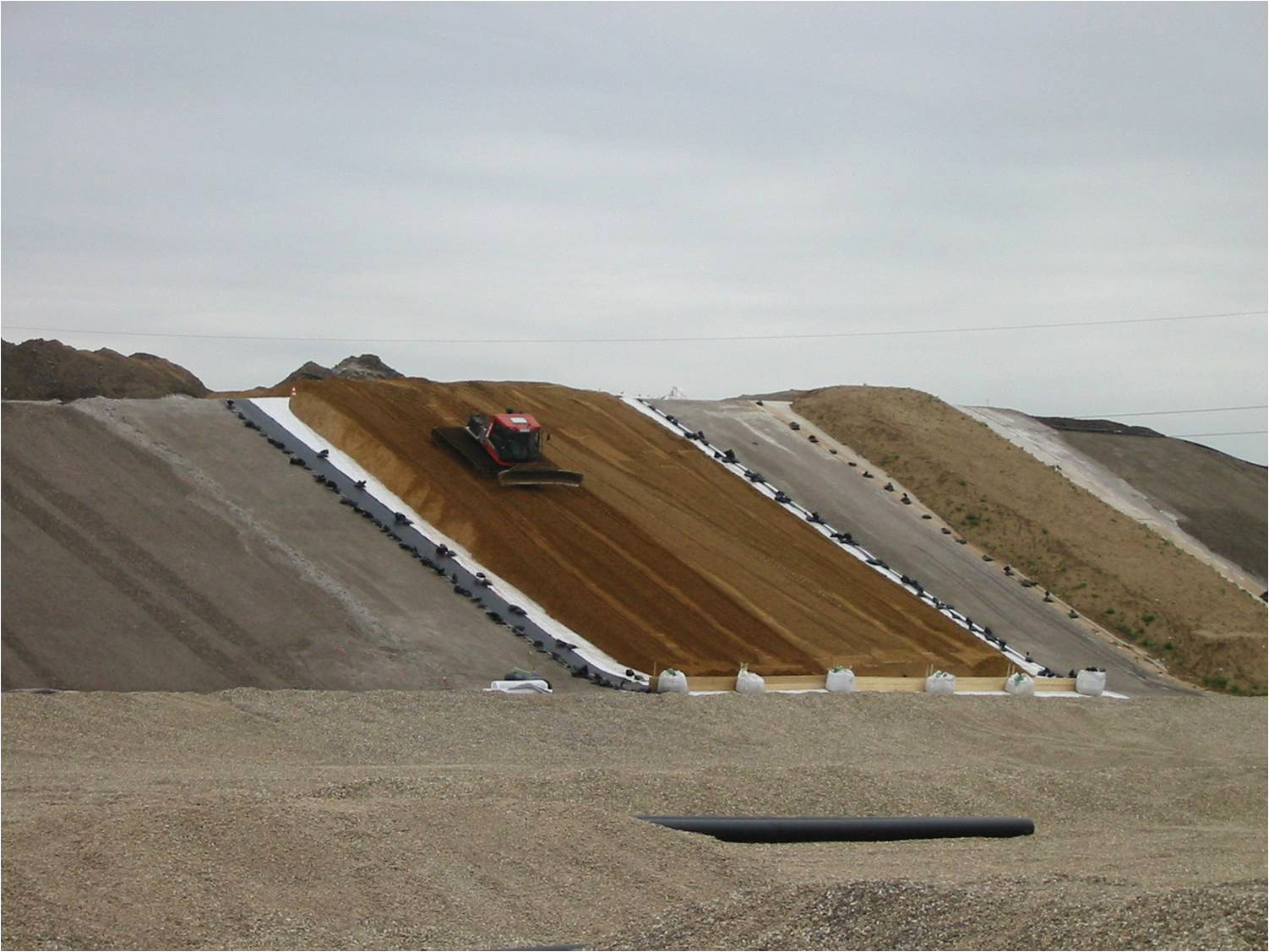
Geogrids are used to prevent sliding on long and steep slopes during installation and use of a landfill capping system.

A geogrid is geosynthetic material used to reinforce soils and similar materials. Soils pull apart under tension. Compared to soil, geogrids are strong in tension. This fact allows them to transfer forces to a larger area of soil than would otherwise be the case.

Geogrids are commonly made of polymer materials, such as polyester, polyvinyl alcohol, polyethylene or polypropylene. They may be woven or knitted from yarns, heat-welded from strips of material, or produced by punching a regular pattern of holes in sheets of material, then stretched into a grid.

The development of methods of preparing relatively rigid polymeric materials by tensile drawing, in a sense "cold working," raised the possibility that such materials could be used in the reinforcement of soils for walls, steep slopes, roadway bases and foundation soils. The principal function of geogrids is for reinforcement. This area, as with many other geosynthetics, is very active, with a number of different products, materials, configurations, etc., making up today's geogrid market. The key feature of all geogrids is that the openings between the adjacent sets of longitudinal and transverse ribs, called "apertures," are large enough to allow for soil strike-through from one side of the geogrid to the other. The ribs of some geogrids are often quite stiff compared to the fibers of geotextiles. As discussed later, not only is rib strength important, but junction strength is also important. The reason for this is that in anchorage situations the soil strike-through within the apertures bears against the transverse ribs, which transmits the load to the longitudinal ribs via the junctions. The junctions are, of course, where the longitudinal and transverse ribs meet and are connected. They are sometimes called "nodes".

Currently there are three categories of geogrids. The first, and original, geogrids (called unitized or homogeneous types, or more commonly referred to as 'punched and drawn geogrids') were invented by Dr Frank Brian Mercer in the United Kingdom at Netlon, Ltd., and were brought in 1982 to North America by the Tensar Corporation. A conference in 1984 was helpful in bringing geogrids to the engineering design community. A similar type of drawn geogrid which originated in Italy by Tenax is also available, as are products by new manufacturers in Asia.

The second category of geogrids are more flexible, textile-like geogrids using bundles of polyethylene-coated polyester fibres as the reinforcing component. They were first developed by ICI Linear Composites LTD in the United Kingdom around 1980. This led to the development of polyester yarn geogrids made on textile weaving machinery. In this process hundreds of continuous fibers are gathered together to form yarns which are woven into longitudinal and transverse ribs with large open spaces between. The cross-overs are joined by knitting or intertwining before the entire unit is protected by a subsequent coating. Bitumen, latex, or PVC are the usual coating materials. Geosynthetics within this group are manufactured by many companies having various trademarked products. There are possibly as many as 25 companies manufacturing coated yarn-type polyester geogrids on a worldwide basis.

The third category of geogrids are made by laser or ultrasonically bonding together polyester or polypropylene rods or straps in a gridlike pattern. Two manufacturers currently make such geogrids.

The geogrid sector is extremely active not only in manufacturing new products, but also in providing significant technical information to aid the design engineer.

== Ecological balance ==
Usually retaining walls are constructed of reinforced concrete, if an impermeable surface is not desired, it would be a sensible solution to create a filling area (but not for dam constructions). Choosing the ground reinforced with geogrid reinforcements instead of reinforced concrete retaining wall will also contribute to the ecological balance. While reinforced concrete wall surfaces cannot be vegetated, the surfaces of filled areas reinforced with geogrid reinforcements can be vegetated.
