= Electrical liner integrity survey =

Electrical liner integrity surveys, also known as leak location surveys are a post-installation quality control method of detecting leaks in geomembranes. Geomembranes are typically used for large-scale containment of liquid or solid waste. These electrical survey techniques are widely embraced as the state-of-the-art methods of locating leaks in installed geomembranes, which is imperative for the long-term protection of groundwater and the maintenance of water resources. Increasingly specified by environmental regulations, the methods are also applied voluntarily by many site owners as responsible environmental stewards and to minimize future liability.

== History ==
Electrical liner integrity surveys were initially developed at Southwest Research Institute through funding provided by the U.S. Environmental Protection Agency as a response to the need to control the quality of geomembrane installations. Three technical papers describing the method were published and presented by Southwest Research Institute in 1982. The first commercial adaptations and applications of the methods were in Chile (1984), the United States (1985), and Slovakia.

The first ASTM standard to address the methods was drafted in 2000 and accepted for publication in 2003.

== Methods ==
The methods that can be used generally fall into two categories depending on whether or not the geomembrane is exposed or covered during the survey. ASTM D6747 provides a standard guide for the selection of electrical detection techniques for various applications. All methods require an electrically conductive medium both above and below the geomembrane and electrical isolation of the survey area from the surrounding ground. Some design foresight may be required in order to ensure that an electrical liner integrity survey can be performed.

Specially formulated geomembranes with a conductive backing can enable the performance of a survey where there is no electrically conductive medium below the geomembrane, such as the primary geomembrane of double-lined facilities with only geonets or geocomposites between the primary and secondary geomembranes and where the ability to place water between the geomembranes is not possible on the slopes. Specially formulated conductive geotextiles are also available to enable electrical surveys for these applications.

There is some debate on the electrical conductivity of geosynthetic clay liners in the application of electrical liner integrity surveys. The moisture content of geosynthetic clay liners is sufficient for the methods as the sheets leave the factory, however the sheets can become desiccated while they are placed in the field. This becomes a problem for encapsulated geosynthetic clay liners, located between the primary and secondary geomembranes, which cannot wick moisture from the underlying subgrade soil. Adding copper wires as part of the construction process allows the geosynthetic clay liner to conduct electricity in order to perform the survey.

=== Bare geomembrane methods ===
The water puddle method (ASTM D7002), the water lance method (ASTM D7703) and the newly introduced arc testing method (ASTM D7953) are used for bare geomembranes. For the water puddle and water lance methods, water is sprayed onto the geomembrane, creating an electrically conductive layer above the geomembrane. A low voltage DC power source is applied to the water above the geomembrane and grounded to the earth below the geomembrane. The leak detection equipment features an ammeter in series with the applied potential circuit. The ammeter registers an increase in current in the presence of a leak, resulting in an audible tone and visual increase in the current level. The expected minimum sensitivity of the water-based bare geomembrane liner integrity methods is a one millimeter diameter circular leak. For the arc testing method, water is not required. A high voltage (Approximately 5000V-35000V) with a very low current is introduced above the geomembrane and grounded to the conductive layer below it. In the presence of a hole, an electrical arc is formed along with an audible alarm. Since the arc testing method is not dependent on water making good contact through the leak, it is more sensitive and comparatively easy to perform in most types of liner construction (ponds, Landfills, tanks etc.)than the water-based methods. The minimum sensitivity of the arc testing bare geomembrane liner integrity method is a pinhole leak.

For geomembranes with a conductive backing, spark testing can be performed (ASTM D7240). For the spark testing method, water is not sprayed onto the exposed geomembrane. A high DC voltage is introduced across the geomembrane, creating a spark where the geomembrane contains a breach.

=== Covered geomembrane methods ===
The dipole method (ASTM D7007 or ASTM D8265) is used for geomembranes covered with earthen materials or water. A high voltage DC power source is applied to the medium above the geomembrane and grounded to the soil underneath the geomembrane. Measurements of voltage potential are taken using a dipole probe in a grid pattern throughout the surface of the survey area. Hole locations can be pinpointed by a characteristic sine wave pattern in the voltage field across the location of a leak. Data collection and voltage mapping are often used with this method to provide quality assurance documentation and additional survey oversight. The sensitivity of the dipole survey method is highly dependent on site conditions such as the moisture content, depth and mineralogy of the cover material for soil-covered geomembranes and the electrical conductivity of solution-covered geomembranes. The expected minimum sensitivity for soil-covered geomembranes is 6.4 mm in diameter for up to 600 mm of earth material depth. The expected minimum sensitivity for water-covered geomembranes is 1.4 mm in diameter.
