= Arfons =

- Commune
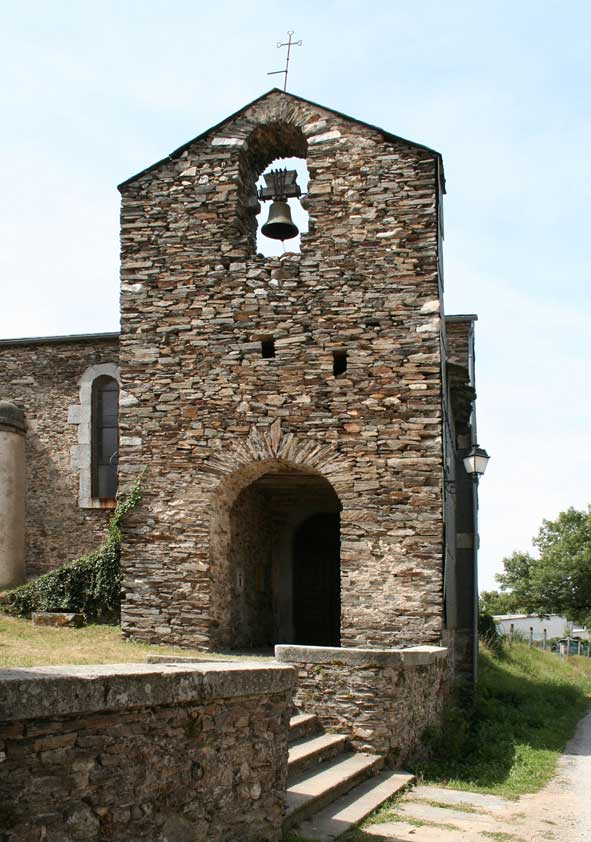
- The church in Arfons

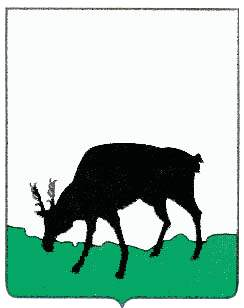
- Coat of arms
- Location of Arfons
- Location within France Location within Occitanie
- Coordinates: 43°25′51″N 2°10′06″E
- Country: France
- Region: Occitania
- Department: Tarn
- Arrondissement: Castres
- Canton: La Montagne noire
- Intercommunality: CC aux sources du Canal du Midi

Government
  - Mayor (2020–2026): Gérard Pinel
- Area^{1}: 40.71 km^{2} (15.72 sq mi)
- Elevation: 659 m (2,162 ft)
- Highest elevation: 904 m (2,966 ft)
- Lowest elevation: 566 m (1,857 ft)
- Population (2023): 188
  - Density: 4.62/km^{2} (12.0/sq mi)
- Time zone: UTC+01:00 (CET)
  - Summer (DST): UTC+02:00 (CEST)
- INSEE/Postal code: 81016 /81110
- ^{1} French Land Register data, which excludes lakes, ponds, glaciers > 1 km^{2} (0.386 sq mi or 247 acres) and river estuaries.

Arfons (French pronunciation: [aʁfɔ̃]; Occitan: Arfonts) is a commune of the Tarn department in southern France.

== See also ==
- Communes of the Tarn department
