= Geomembrane =

Thin barrier used to control fluids; usually applied to structures or landscapes

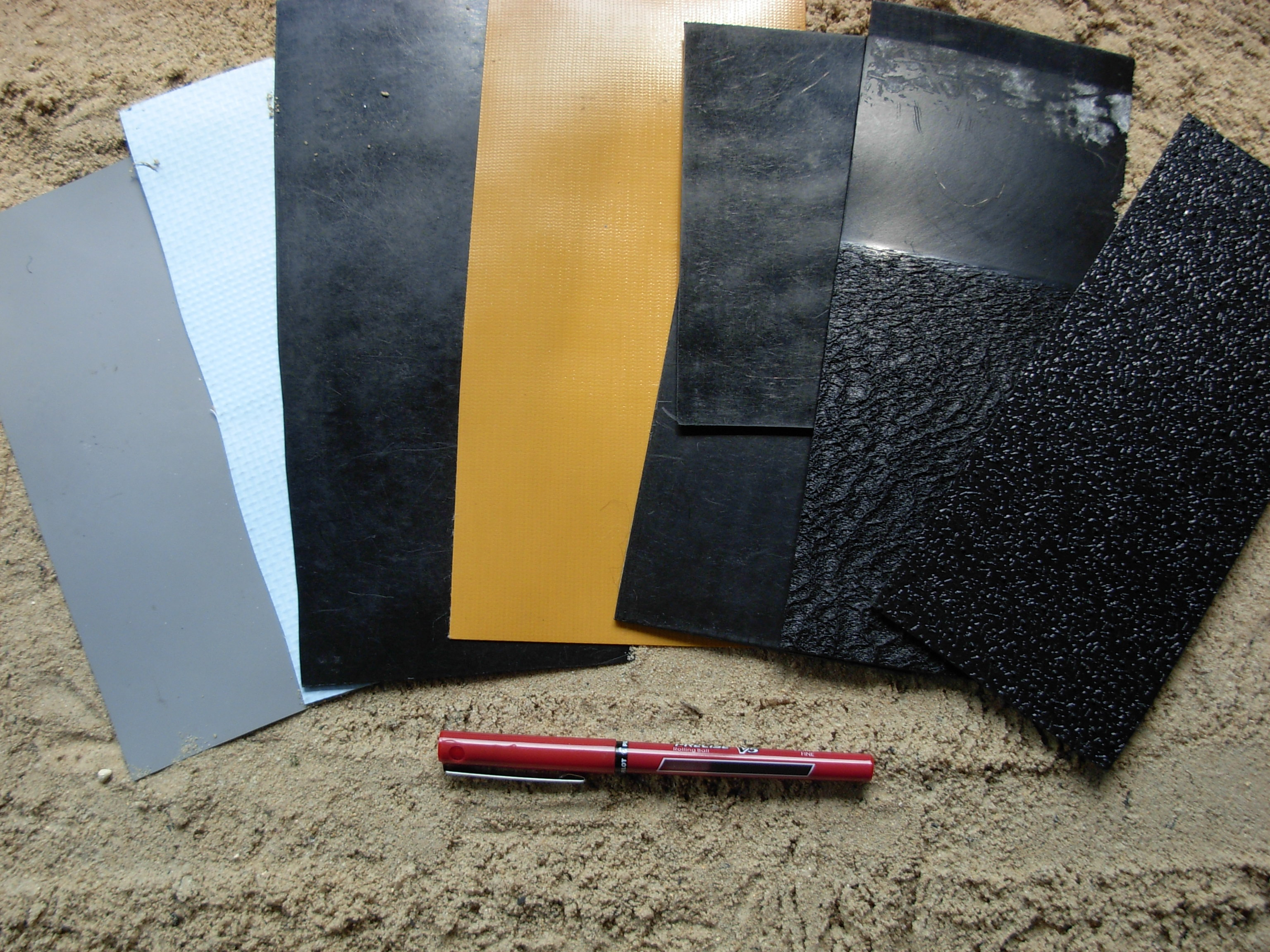
A selection of Geomembrane samples

A geomembrane is a very low permeability synthetic membrane liner or barrier used with any geotechnical engineering related material so as to control fluid (liquid or gas) migration in a human-made project, structure, or system. Geomembranes are made from relatively thin continuous polymeric sheets, but they can also be made from the impregnation of geotextiles with asphalt, elastomer or polymer sprays, or as multilayered bitumen geocomposites (also known as bituminous geomembranes or BGMs). Continuous polymer sheet geomembranes are, by far, the most common.

== Manufacturing ==
The manufacturing of geomembranes begins with the production of raw materials, which include polymer resin and various additives such as antioxidants, plasticizers, fillers, carbon black, and lubricants (as a processing aid). These raw materials (i.e., the "formulation") are then processed into sheets of various widths and thickness by extrusion, calendering, and/or spread coating.

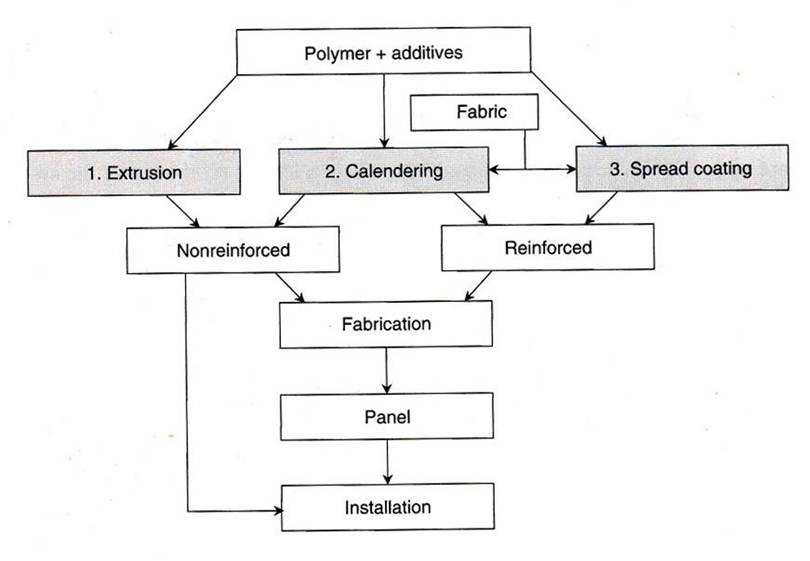
Three methods used to manufacture geomembranes

Common production routes include blown-film extrusion (especially for polyethylene), flat-die extrusion, calendering (common for PVC and some reinforced products), and coextrusion or lamination for multilayer or textured sheets. Bituminous geomembranes are produced by impregnating a reinforcing geotextile with modified or oxidized bitumen, often in combination with additional layers such as a glass fleece or sanded surface. Surface texturing may be achieved by impingement, structuring, coextrusion, or other methods to improve interface friction.

A 2010 estimate cited geomembranes as the largest geosynthetic material in dollar terms at US$1.8 billion per year worldwide, which is 35% of the market. Commercial market research published in the mid-2020s has estimated the global geomembrane market at roughly USD 2.5–3.5 billion, with projected annual growth of about 5–7.5% through the early 2030s. Such figures are proprietary commercial estimates and vary by methodology.

High-density polyethylene (HDPE) is the most widely used geomembrane polymer largely because of its combination of chemical resistance, low permeability, and relatively low cost. Linear low-density polyethylene (LLDPE) and flexible polypropylene (fPP) are frequently selected where greater flexibility or multiaxial strain capacity is required. Polyvinyl chloride (PVC), chlorosulfonated polyethylene (CSPE), ethylene propylene diene monomer (EPDM), and bituminous geomembranes occupy smaller but important niches, often chosen for specific chemical, weathering, flexibility, low thermal expansion, or installation requirements.

The above market figures represent commercial estimates rather than peer-reviewed data. Projections for future geomembrane usage remain strongly dependent on application and geography.

=== Types of polymeric geomembranes ===
Major geomembrane polymers exhibit distinct combinations of chemical resistance, flexibility, weldability, and long-term durability.

- HDPE offers broad chemical resistance, low permeability, and high tensile strength at relatively low cost, but is relatively stiff, has a high coefficient of thermal expansion, and is susceptible to stress cracking under certain conditions.
- LLDPE provides greater flexibility and multiaxial strain capacity than HDPE while retaining good chemical resistance; it is widely used where conformability or settlement accommodation is important.
- fPP is highly flexible with excellent multiaxial elongation and good low-temperature performance, though hydrocarbon resistance is more limited than polyethylene.
- PVC is flexible and easy to seam (including by solvent or thermal methods) but requires plasticizers that can migrate over time, affecting long-term flexibility.
- CSPE (often reinforced) combines good chemical and weathering resistance with flexibility; it is thermally weldable.
- EPDM is a thermoset elastomer with excellent flexibility and weathering resistance; seams are typically made by adhesive or tape rather than thermal fusion.
- Bituminous geomembranes (BGMs) are composite materials consisting of a reinforcing geotextile impregnated with elastomer-modified or oxidized bitumen. They exhibit very low thermal expansion, high mass, good puncture resistance, and the ability to be torch-welded at very low temperatures.

== Properties ==
The majority of generic geomembrane test methods that are referenced worldwide are by ASTM International (ASTM) due to their long history of work in the field. More recently, the International Organization for Standardization (ISO) has also developed its own test methods. Lastly, the Geosynthetic Research Institute (GRI) has developed test methods to fill gaps not addressed by ASTM or ISO. Individual countries and manufacturers often have specific (and sometimes) proprietary test methods.

=== Physical properties ===
The main physical properties of geomembranes as-manufactured are:

- Thickness (smooth sheet, textured, asperity height)
- Density
- Melt flow index
- Mass per unit area (weight)
- Vapor transmission (water and solvent)
- Coefficient of Thermal Expansion

=== Mechanical properties ===
There are a number of mechanical tests that have been developed to determine the strength of polymeric sheet materials. Many have been adopted for use in evaluating geomembranes. They represent both quality control and design, i.e., index versus performance tests.

- Tensile strength and elongation (index, wide width, axisymmetric, and seams)
- Tear resistance
- Impact resistance
- Puncture resistance
- Interface shear strength
- Anchorage strength
- Stress cracking (constant load and single point)

=== Endurance ===
Any phenomenon that causes polymeric chain scission, bond breaking, additive depletion, or extraction within the geomembrane must be considered as compromising to its long-term performance. There are a number of potential concerns in this regard. While each is material-specific, the general behavior trend is to cause the geomembrane to become brittle in its stress-strain behavior over time. There are several mechanical properties to track in monitoring such long term degradation: the decrease in elongation at failure, the increase in modulus of elasticity, the increase (then decrease) in stress at failure (i.e., strength), and the general loss of ductility. Obviously, many of the physical and mechanical properties could be used to monitor the polymeric degradation process.

- Ultraviolet light exposure (laboratory or field)
- Radioactive degradation
- Biological degradation (animals, fungi or bacteria)
- Chemical degradation
- Thermal behavior (hot or cold)
- Oxidative degradation

Material-specific issues include antioxidant depletion and stress cracking in HDPE, plasticizer loss in PVC, and surface oxidation or chalking in some elastomers. Bituminous geomembranes are less affected by thermal expansion and can exhibit self-healing behaviour under certain conditions.

=== Lifetime ===
Geomembranes degrade slowly enough that their lifetime behavior is as yet uncharted. Thus, accelerated testing, either by high stress, elevated temperatures and/or aggressive liquids, is the only way to determine how the material will behave long-term. Lifetime prediction methods use the following means of interpreting the data:

- Stress limit testing: A method used by the HDPE pipe industry in the United States for determining the value of hydrostatic design basis stress.
- Rate process method: Used in Europe for pipes and geomembranes. The method yields similar results to stress limit testing.
- Hoechst multiparameter approach: A method that utilizes biaxial stresses and stress relaxation for lifetime prediction and can include seams as well.
- Arrhenius modeling: A method for testing geomembranes (and other geosynthetics) described in Koerner for both buried and exposed conditions.

Service life is strongly influenced by resin quality, additive package, exposure conditions (buried vs. exposed), temperature, and chemical environment. Installation damage and seam quality are frequent contributors to reduced performance in the field.

== Seaming ==
The fundamental mechanism of seaming polymeric geomembrane sheets together is to temporarily reorganize the polymer structure (by melting or softening) of the two opposing surfaces to be joined in a controlled manner that, after the application of pressure, results in the two sheets being bonded together.

A propane torch is followed by a weighted roller for a typical torch weld of a bituminous geomembrane

This reorganization results from an input of energy that originates from either thermal or chemical processes. These processes may involve the addition of additional polymer in the area to be bonded.

Ideally, seaming two geomembrane sheets should result in no net loss of tensile strength across the two sheets, and the joined sheets should perform as one single geomembrane sheet. However, due to stress concentrations resulting from the seam geometry, current seaming techniques may result in minor tensile strength and/or elongation loss relative to the parent sheet. The characteristics of the seamed area are a function of the type of geomembrane and the seaming technique used.

Common methods include dual-track hot-wedge welding (widely used for polyethylene), extrusion fillet welding, hot-air welding, solvent welding (PVC), adhesive or tape seaming (EPDM and some others), and torch welding (used for bituminous geomembranes). Seam quality is routinely verified by a combination of destructive shear/peel testing and nondestructive methods such as air-channel pressure testing, vacuum-box testing, air-lance testing, ultrasonic inspection, and electrical leak location.

== Applications ==
Geomembranes have been used in the following environmental, geotechnical, hydraulic, transportation, and private development applications:

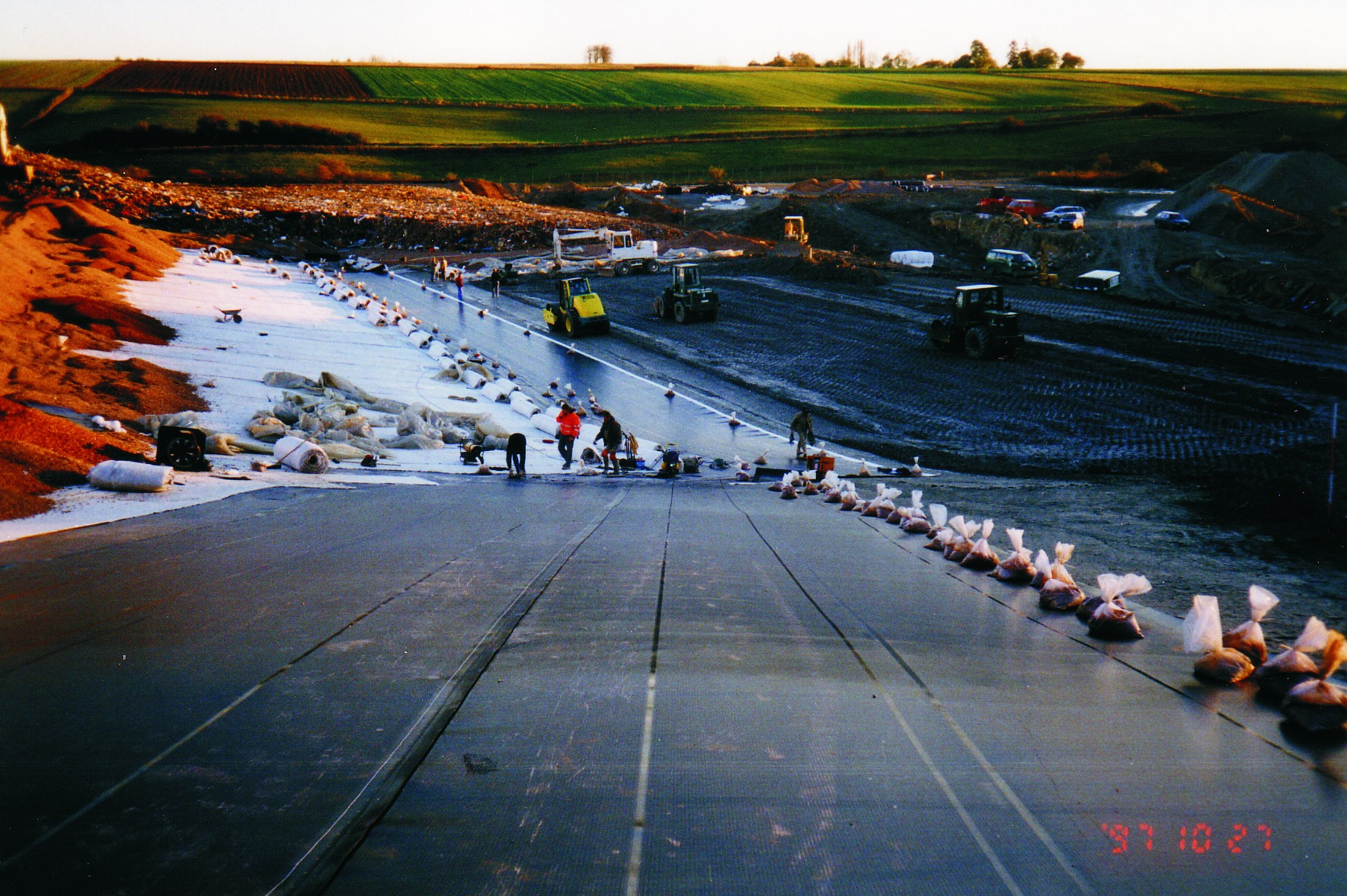
Geomembrane installation as part of the construction of a base liner system of a landfill

- As liners for potable water
- As liners for reserve water (e.g., safe shutdown of nuclear facilities)
- As liners for waste liquids (e.g., sewage sludge)
- Liners for radioactive or hazardous waste liquid
- As liners for secondary containment of underground storage tanks
- As liners for solar ponds
- As liners for brine solutions
- As liners for the agriculture industry
- As liners for the aquiculture industry, such as ponds used to raise fish or shrimp
- As liners for golf course water holes and sand bunkers
- As liners for all types of decorative and architectural ponds
- As liners for water conveyance canals
- As liners for various waste conveyance canals
- As liners for primary, secondary, and/or tertiary solid-waste landfills and waste piles
- As liners for heap leach pads
- As covers (caps) for solid-waste landfills
- As covers for aerobic and anaerobic manure digesters in the agriculture industry
- As covers for power plant coal ash
- As liners for vertical walls: single or double with leak detection
- As cutoffs within zoned earth dams for seepage control
- As linings for emergency spillways
- As waterproofing liners within tunnels and pipelines
- As waterproof facing of earth and rockfill dams
- As waterproof facing for roller compacted concrete dams
- As waterproof facing for masonry and concrete dams
- Within cofferdams for seepage control
- As floating reservoirs for seepage control
- As floating reservoir covers for preventing pollution
- To contain and transport liquids in trucks
- To contain and transport potable water and other liquids in the ocean
- As a barrier to odors from landfills
- As a barrier to vapors (radon, hydrocarbons, etc.) beneath buildings
- To control expansive soils
- To control frost-susceptible soils
- To shield sinkhole-susceptible areas from flowing water
- To prevent infiltration of water in sensitive areas
- To form barrier tubes as dams
- To face structural supports as temporary cofferdams
- To conduct water flow into preferred paths
- Beneath highways to prevent pollution from deicing salts
- Beneath and adjacent to highways to capture hazardous liquid spills
- As containment structures for temporary surcharges
- To aid in establishing uniformity of subsurface compressibility and subsidence
- Beneath asphalt overlays as a waterproofing layer
- To contain seepage losses in existing above-ground tanks
- As flexible forms where loss of material cannot be allowed

== See also ==
- Electrical liner integrity survey
- Bituminous geomembrane
