= Christensen failure criterion =

The Christensen failure criterion is a material failure theory for isotropic materials that attempts to span the range from ductile to brittle materials. It has a two-property form calibrated by the uniaxial tensile and compressive strengths T $\left (\sigma_T\right )$ and C $\left (\sigma_C\right )$.

The theory was developed by Stanford professor Richard M. Christensen and first published in 1997.

== Description ==
The Christensen failure criterion is composed of two separate subcriteria representing competitive failure mechanisms. When expressed in principal stress components, it is given by :

Polynomial invariants failure criterion

For $0\le\frac{T}{C}\le1$

$\left (\frac{1}{T}-\frac{1}{C} \right )\left (\sigma_1+\sigma_2+\sigma_3\right )+\frac{1}{2TC}\left [\left (\sigma_1-\sigma_2\right )^2+\left (\sigma_2-\sigma_3\right )^2+\left (\sigma_3-\sigma_1\right )^2\right ]\le 1$	1

Coordinated Fracture Criterion

For $0\le \frac{T}{C}\le \frac{1}{2}$

$\begin{array}{lcl} \sigma_1 & \le & T \\ \sigma_2 & \le & T \\ \sigma_3 & \le & T \end{array}$	2

For plane stresses,$\sigma_3 = 0$ and T/C=0.3(brittle materials). Blue line is polynomial invariants failure criterion (1). Red lines are coordinated fracture criterion(2).

The geometric form of (1) is that of a paraboloid in principal stress space. The fracture criterion (2) (applicable only over the partial range 0 ≤ T/C ≤ 1/2 ) cuts slices off the paraboloid, leaving three flattened elliptical surfaces on it. The fracture cutoff is vanishingly small at T/C=1/2 but it grows progressively larger as T/C diminishes.

The organizing principle underlying the theory is that all isotropic materials admit a distinct classification system based upon their T/C ratio. The comprehensive failure criterion (1) and (2) reduces to the Mises criterion at the ductile limit, T/C = 1. At the brittle limit, T/C = 0, it reduces to a form that cannot sustain any tensile components of stress.

Many cases of verification have been examined over the complete range of materials from extremely ductile to extremely brittle types. Also, examples of applications have been given. Related criteria distinguishing ductile from brittle failure behaviors have been derived and interpreted.

Applications have been given by Ha to the failure of the isotropic, polymeric matrix phase in fiber composite materials.

== See also ==
- Strength of materials
- material failure theory
- Von Mises yield criterion
- Mohr–Coulomb theory
