= Huber (disambiguation) =

Huber is a surname of German origin.

Huber may also refer to:

== Places in the United States ==
- Huber, Georgia
- Huber, Michigan
- Huber, Montana
- Huber Heights, Ohio and Huber Ridge, Ohio
- Huber, Oregon
- Huber, Texas

== Other uses ==
- Huber's equation, basic formula in elastic material tension calculations
- Huber loss, loss function used in probabilities and modelling systems
- Huber Mansion, historical residence in Istanbul, Turkey
- J.M. Huber Corporation
- Joseph Huber Brewing Company

== See also ==
- Hubersdorf, a municipality in Switzerland
- Hubert
