= Michael P. Collins =

Canadian structural engineer

Michael P. Collins CM FRSC
- Education: University of New South Wales, University of Canterbury
- Occupation: Structural engineer
- Scientific career
- Fields: Civil engineering
- Workplaces: University of Toronto

Michael Patrick Collins CM FRSC is a Canadian structural engineer whose research is focused on the design and evaluation of reinforced and prestressed concrete buildings, bridges, nuclear containment structures and offshore oil platforms.

== Biography ==
Collins received his BE from the University of Canterbury in New Zealand in 1964 and his PhD from the University of New South Wales in Australia in 1968. He joined the University of Toronto in 1969, was appointed to the Bahen-Tanenbaum Chair in Civil Engineering in 1995 and was selected as a University Professor in 1999. He is currently working on his Doctorate of Science.

Collins has concentrated his research effort on understanding how cracked reinforced concrete resists shear stress. Shear failures can cause concrete structures to collapse without warning and hence, accurate analytical models for shear behaviour are critical for public safety. Unfortunately, most traditional shear design procedures rely upon empirical design rules which lack a rigorous theoretical basis and can be dangerous if applied to new situations. The Compression Field Theory, and subsequently the Modified Compression Field Theory, developed by Professor Collins and his colleagues at the University of Toronto, Division of Engineering Science, provides a rational basis for shear design and has received worldwide recognition. A Simplified Modified Compression Field Theory is currently the design standard in the Canadian CAN/CSA A23.3-04 which is the basic truss model, and soon to be updated and included in the European Building Code. He is the author of over 80 technical papers, 8 of which have received a research prize.

In 2005, Collins was chosen as one of 10 provincial finalists in TVOntario’s first Best Lecturer competition. In 2011, Collins was elected as a Fellow of the Royal Society of Canada.
