= Concrete cone failure =

Failure mode of anchors in concrete submitted to tensile force

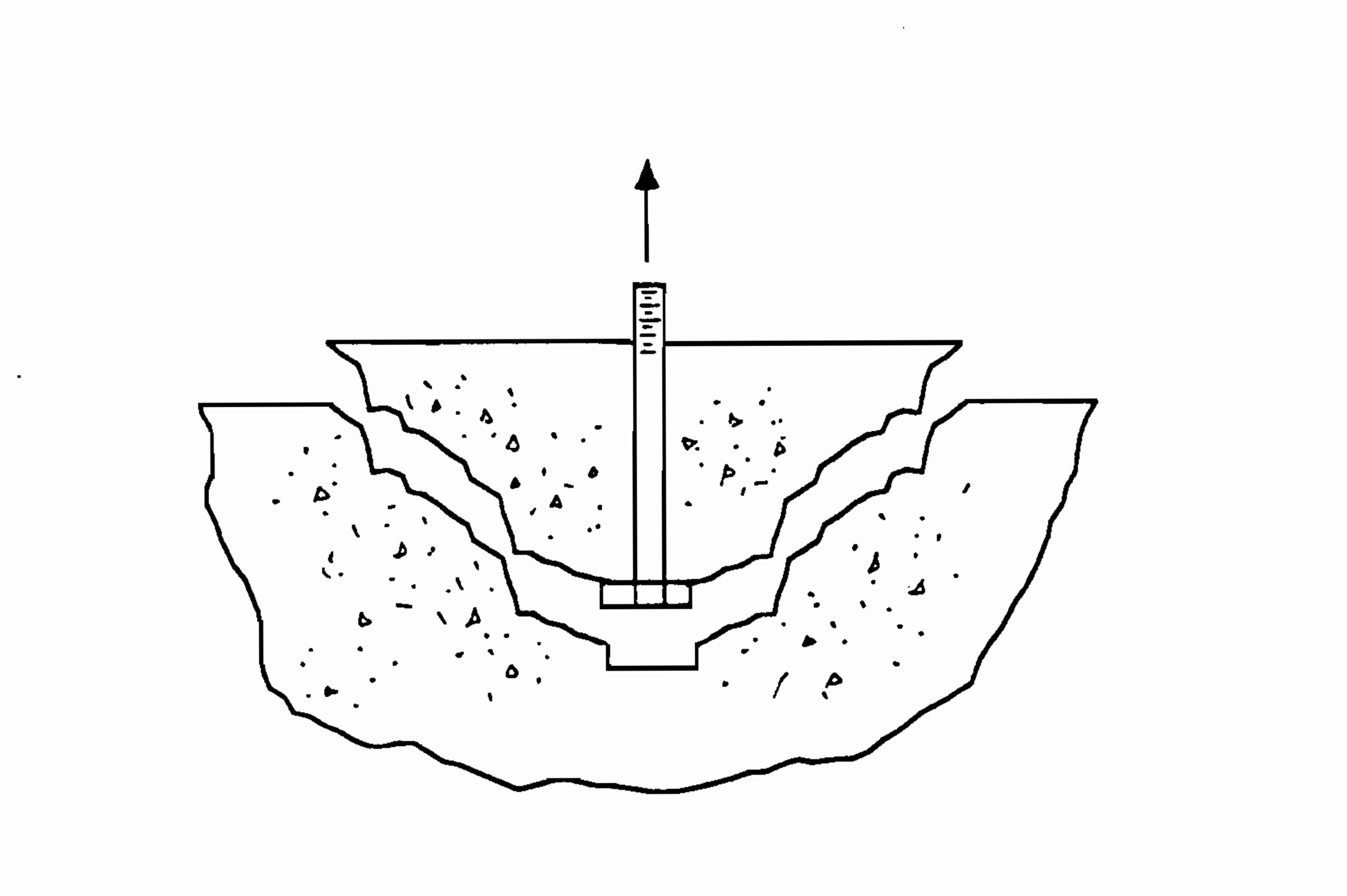
Concrete cone failure for headed stud

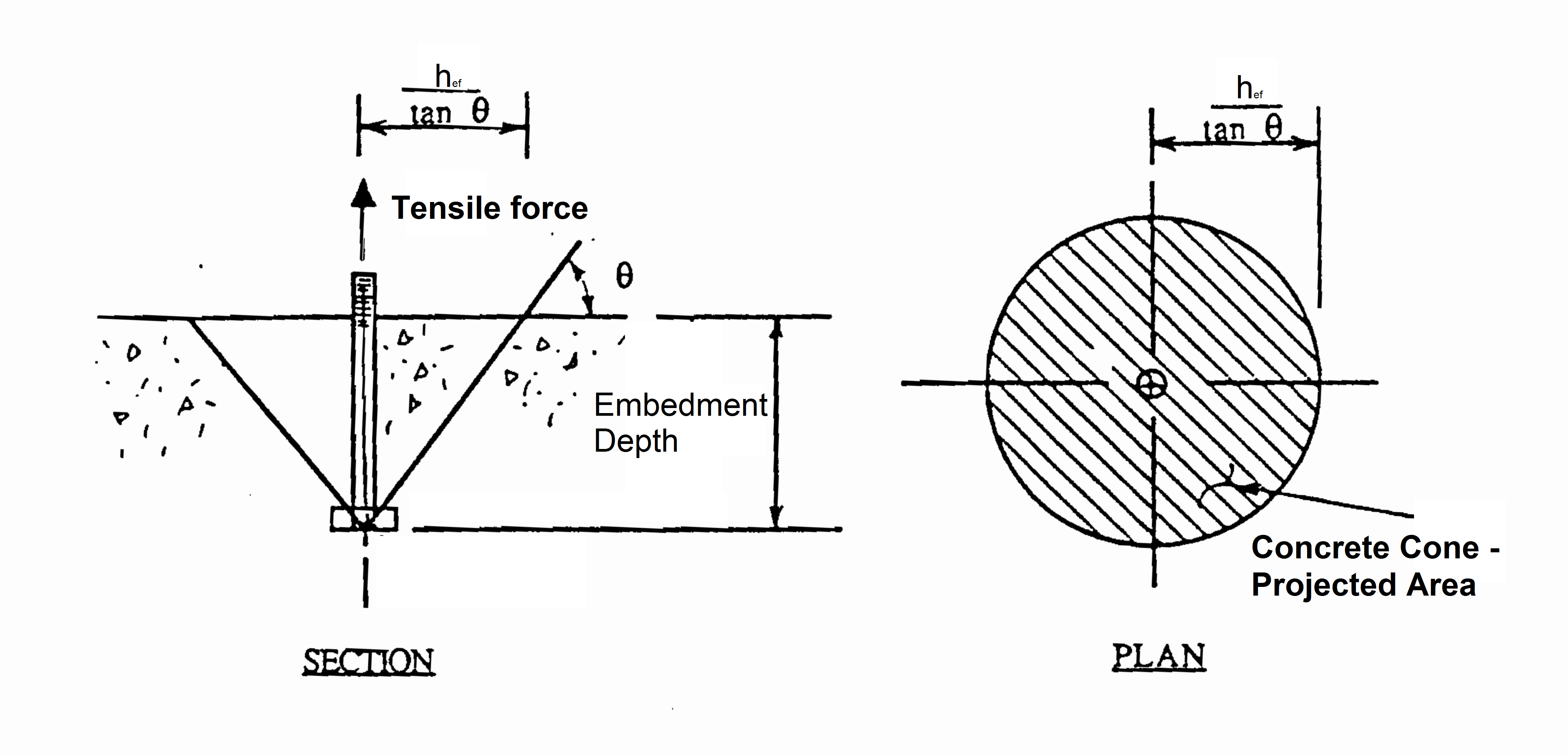
Concrete Cone Model

Concrete cone is one of the failure modes of anchors in concrete, loaded by a tensile force. The failure is governed by crack growth in concrete, which forms a typical cone shape having the anchor's axis as revolution axis.

== Mechanical models ==
=== ACI 349-85 ===
Under tension loading, the concrete cone failure surface has 45° inclination. A constant distribution of tensile stresses is then assumed. The concrete cone failure load $N_0$ of a single anchor in uncracked concrete unaffected by edge influences or overlapping cones of neighboring anchors is given by:

$N_0 = f_{ct} {A_{N}} [N]$

Where:

$f_{ct}$ - tensile strength of concrete

$A_{N}$ - Cone's projected area

=== Concrete capacity design (CCD) approach for fastening to concrete ===
Under tension loading, the concrete capacity of a single anchor is calculated assuming an inclination between the failure surface and surface of the concrete member of about 35°. The concrete cone failure load $N_0$ of a single anchor in uncracked concrete unaffected by edge influences or overlapping cones of neighboring anchors is given by:

$N_0 = k \sqrt{f_{cc}} {h_{ef}}^{1.5} [N]$,

Where:

$k$ - 13.5 for post-installed fasteners, 15.5 for cast-in-site fasteners

$f_{cc}$ - Concrete compressive strength measured on cubes [MPa]

${h_{ef}}$ - Embedment depth of the anchor [mm]

The model is based on fracture mechanics theory and takes into account the size effect, particularly for the factor ${h_{ef}}^{1.5}$ which differentiates from ${h_{ef}}^{2}$ expected from the first model. In the case of concrete tensile failure with increasing member size, the failure load increases less than the available failure surface; that means the nominal stress at failure (peak load divided by failure area) decreases.

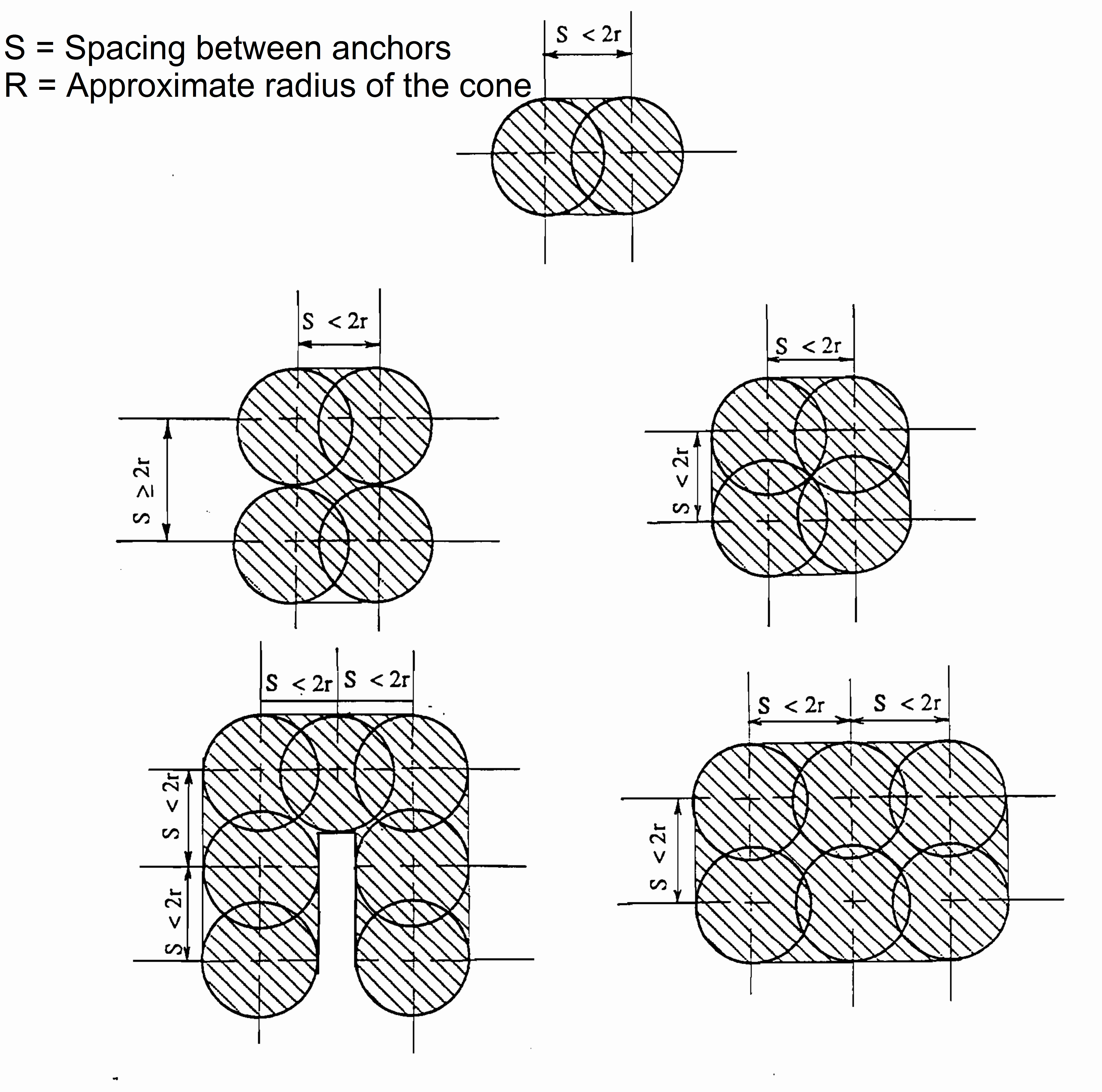
Overlapping Areas in case of group of anchors

Current codes take into account a reduction of the theoretical concrete cone capacity $N_0$ considering: (i) the presence of edges; (ii) the overlapping cones due to group effect; (iii) the presence of an eccentricity of the tension load.

=== Difference between models ===
The tension failure loads predicted by the CCD method fits experimental results over a wide range of embedment depth (e.g. 100 – 600 mm). Anchor load bearing capacity provided by ACI 349 does not consider size effect, thus an underestimated value for the load-carrying capacity is obtained for large embedment depths.

=== Influence of the head size ===
For large head size, the bearing pressure in the bearing zone diminishes. An increase of the anchor's load-carrying capacity is observed . Different modification factors were proposed in technical literature.

=== Un-cracked and cracked concrete ===
Anchors, experimentally show a lower load-bearing capacity when installed in a cracked concrete member. The reduction is up to 40% with respect to the un-cracked condition, depending on the crack width. The reduction is due to the impossibility to transfer both normal and tangential stresses at the crack plane.

== See also ==
- Fracture mechanics
- Concrete fracture analysis
- Size effect
- Anchor Cone
