= MMF =

MMF may refer to:

== Medicine ==
- Mismatch field, a brain response measured in magnetoencephalography
- Mycophenolate mofetil (tradename CellCept), an immunosuppressant drug used to prevent rejection in organ transplantation

== Science and technology ==
- Magnetomotive force
- Methoxymethylfurfural, an intermediate in the production of renewable plastics and biofuels
- Micro-mechanics of failure, a failure theory for fibre reinforced composites
- micro-microfarad, (MMF or μμF), an obsolete unit of capacitance, equivalent to a picofarad
- Morgan–Mercer–Flodin, growth model
- Multi-mode optical fiber

== Computing ==
- Memory-mapped file, a segment of virtual memory which has been assigned a direct byte-for-byte correlation with some portion of a file or file-like resource
- Minimum Marketable Feature, in software engineering, the smallest set of functionality that must be delivered in order for the customer to perceive value
- .mmf, a file extension used for Synthetic Music Mobile Application Format polyphonic ring tones
- Multimedia Fusion and Multimedia Fusion 2, software authoring tools from Clickteam
- Multimedia framework, a software framework that handles media
- Multiple master fonts, a format for fonts

== Organisations and events ==
- Märta Måås-Fjetterström, a Swedish rug maker and workshop
- Manitoba Métis Federation
- Mercy Ministries Foundation, a Christian charitable organisation
- Meredith Music Festival in Victoria, Australia
- Mnet Music Video Festival
- Morris, Marshall, Faulkner & Co., English Pre-Raphaelite furnishings and decorative arts manufacturer and retailer
- Music Managers Forum
- Myna Mahila Foundation, an Indian charitable foundation

== Economics and finance ==
- Money market fund, an open-ended mutual fund that invests in short-term debt securities such as US Treasury bills and commercial paper
- Master of Mathematical Finance, a degree focusing quantitative analysis and mathematical finance
- Master of Money and Finance, a master's degree offered by the House of Finance at Goethe University Frankfurt, Germany

== Other ==
- "Make Money Fast!", an email spam that has persisted on the internet since at least 1988
- Male-male-female, a type of threesome involving two males and one female
- Memphis May Fire, an American metalcore band
- Mamfe Airport, Cameroon (by IATA code)
- Mundat language (by ISO 639 code)
- Multinational MRTT Fleet, a fleet of ultimately nine Airbus A330 MRTT aircraft operated by the European Defence Agency (EDA) for its six NATO nations
- A US Navy hull classification symbol: Fleet minelayer (MMF)
