= T-criterion =

The T-failure criterion is a set of material failure criteria that can be used to predict both brittle and ductile failure.

These criteria were designed as a replacement for the von Mises yield criterion which predicts the unphysical result that pure hydrostatic tensile loading of metals never leads to failure. The T-criteria use the volumetric stress in addition to the deviatoric stress used by the von Mises criterion and are similar to the Drucker Prager yield criterion. T-criteria have been designed on the basis of energy considerations and the observation that the reversible elastic energy density storage process has a limit which can be used to determine when a material has failed.

== Description ==
Only in the case of pure shear does the strain energy density stored in the material and calculated by the area under the $\bar{\sigma}$-$\bar{\epsilon}$ curve, represent the total amount of energy stored. In all other cases, there is a divergence between the actual and calculated stored energy in the material, which is maximum in the case of pure hydrostatic loading, where, according to the von Mises criterion, no energy is stored. This paradox is resolved if a second constitutive equation is introduced, that relates hydrostatic pressure p with the volume change $\Theta$. These two curves, namely $\bar{\sigma}-\bar{\epsilon}$ and (p-$\Theta$) are essential for a complete description of material behaviour up to failure. Thus, two criteria must be accounted for when considering failure and two constitutive equations that describe material response. According to this criterion, an upper limit to allowable strains is set either by a critical value Τ_{V,0} of the elastic energy density due to volume change (dilatational energy) or by a critical value Τ_{D,0} of the elastic energy density due to change in shape (distortional energy). The volume of material is considered to have failed by extensive plastic flow when the distortional energy Τ_{d} reaches the critical value Τ_{D,0} or by extensive dilatation when the dilatational energy Τ_{v} reaches a critical value Τ_{V,0}. The two critical values Τ_{D,0} and Τ_{V,0} are considered material constants independent of the shape of the volume of material considered and the induced loading, but dependent on the strain rate and temperature.

== Deployment for Isotropic Metals ==
For the development of the criterion, a continuum mechanics approach is adopted. The material volume is considered to be a continuous medium with no particular form or manufacturing defect. It is also considered to behave as a linear elastic isotropically hardening material, where stresses and strains are related by the generalized Hooke’s law and by the incremental theory of plasticity with the von Mises flow rule. For such materials, the following assumptions are considered to hold:
(a) The total increment of a strain component $d\epsilon_{i,j}$ is decomposed into the elastic and the plastic $d\epsilon_{i,j}^e$ increment and $d\epsilon_{i,j}^p$ respectively:
$d\epsilon_{i,j}=d\epsilon_{i,j}^e+d\epsilon_{i,j}^p$ (1)
(b) The elastic strain increment $d\epsilon_{i,j}^e$ is given by Hooke’s law:
$d\epsilon_{i,j}^e=\cfrac{1}{2G}(d{\sigma}_{i,j}-\cfrac{3\nu}{1+{\nu}}{\delta}_{i,j}dp)$(2)
where $G=\cfrac{E}{2(1+\nu)}$ the shear modulus, $\nu$ the Poisson’s ratio and ${\delta}_{i,j}$ the Krönecker delta.
(c) The plastic strain increment $d\epsilon_{i,j}^p$ is proportional to the respective deviatoric stress:
$d\epsilon_{i,j}^p=s_{i,j}d{\lambda}$(3)
where $s_{i,j}={\sigma}_{i,j}-{\delta}_{i,j}p$ and $d{\lambda}$ an infinitesimal scalar. (3) implies that the plastic strain increment:

- depends on the value of stresses, not on their variation
- is independent of the hydrostatic component of the Cauchy stress tensor
- is collinear with the deviatoric stresses (isotropic material)

(d) The increment in plastic work per unit volume using (4.16) is:
$dw_{p}={\sigma}_{i,j}d{\epsilon}_{i,j}^p={\sigma}_{i,j}s_{i,j}d{\lambda}$ (4)
and the increment in strain energy, $dT$, equals to the total differential of the potential ${\Pi}$:
$dT=d{\Pi}=pd{\Theta}+{\sigma}d{\epsilon}=dT_{V}+dT_{D}^*$(5)
where ${\Theta}={\epsilon}_{11}+{\epsilon}_{22}+{\epsilon}_{33}$, $p=\cfrac{1}{3}({\sigma}_{11}+{\sigma}_{22}+{\sigma}_{33})$ and for metals following the von Mises yield law, by definition
$\bar{\sigma}=\cfrac{1}{2}\sqrt{2}[({\sigma}_{11}-{\sigma}_{22})^2+({\sigma}_{22}-{\sigma}_{33})^2+({\sigma}_{33}-{\sigma}_{11})^2]^{1/2}$(6)
$\bar{\epsilon}=\cfrac{1'''}{2}\sqrt{2}[({\epsilon}_{11}-{\epsilon}_{22})^2+({\epsilon}_{22}-{\epsilon}_{33})^2+({\epsilon}_{33}-{\epsilon}_{11})^2]^{1/2}$(7)
are the equivalent stress and strain respectively. In (5) the first term of the right hand side, $dT_{V}=pd\Theta$ is the increment in elastic energy for unit volume change due to hydrostatic pressure. Its integral over a load path is the total amount of dilatational strain energy density stored in the material. The second term $dT_{D}^*=\bar{\sigma}d\bar{\epsilon}$ is the energy required for an infinitesimal distortion of the material. The integral of this quantity is the distortional strain energy density. The theory of plastic flow permits the evaluation of stresses, strains and strain energy densities along a path provided that $d{\lambda}$ in (3) is known. In elasticity, linear or nonlinear, $d{\lambda}$. In the case of strain hardening materials, $d{\lambda}$ can be evaluated by recording the $\bar{\sigma}=\bar{\sigma}(\bar{\epsilon})$ curve in a pure shear experiment. The hardening function after point “y” in Figure 1 is then:
$H(\bar{\sigma},\bar{\epsilon})=\cfrac{d\bar{\sigma}}{d\bar{\epsilon}}$(8)
and the infinitesimal scalar $d{\lambda}$ is: $d{\lambda}=\cfrac{3}{2\bar\sigma^2}dw_p(H)$ (9)
where $dw_p(H)$ is the infinitesimal increase in plastic work (see Figure 1). The elastic part of the total distortional strain energy density is:
$dT_D=\bar{\sigma}d\bar{\epsilon}^e$ (10)
where $\bar{\epsilon}^e$ is the elastic part of the equivalent strain. When there is no nonlinear elastic behaviour, by integrating (4.22) the elastic distortional strain energy density is:
$T_D=\int\bar{\sigma}d\bar{\epsilon}^e=\cfrac{1}{6G}\bar{\sigma}^2$ (11)
Similarly, by integrating the increment in elastic energy for unit volume change due to hydrostatic pressure, $dT_V=pd\Theta$, the dilatational strain energy density is:
$T_V=\int{pd\Theta}=\cfrac{1}{2K}p^2=\cfrac{1}{2}K{\Theta}^2$ (12)
assuming that the unit volume change ${\Theta}$ is the elastic straining, proportional to the hydrostatic pressure, p (Figure 2):
${\Theta}=\cfrac{1}{2K}p$ or $d{\Theta}=\cfrac{1}{K}dp$ (13)
where ${\Theta}={\epsilon}_{11}+{\epsilon}_{22}+{\epsilon}_{33}$, $p=\cfrac{1}{3}({\sigma}_{11}+{\sigma}_{22}+{\sigma}_{33})$ and $K=\cfrac{E}{3(1-2\nu)}$ the bulk modulus of the material.
In summary, in order to use (12) and (13) to determine the failure of a material volume, the following assumptions hold:

- The material is isotropic and follows the von Mises yield condition
- The elastic part of the stress-strain curve is linear
- The relationship between hydrostatic pressure and unit volume change is linear
- The derivative (hardening slope) must be positive or zero

== Limitations ==
The criterion will not predict any failure due to distortion for elastic-perfectly plastic, rigid-plastic, or strain softening materials. For the case of nonlinear elasticity, appropriate calculations for the integrals in and (12) and (13) accounting for the nonlinear elastic material properties must be performed. The two threshold values for the elastic strain energy $T_{V,0}$ and $T_{D,0}$ are derived from experimental data. A drawback of the criterion is that elastic strain energy densities are small and comparatively hard to derive. Nevertheless, example values are presented in the literature as well as applications where the T-criterion appears to perform quite well.
