= Heinrich Hencky =

German engineer

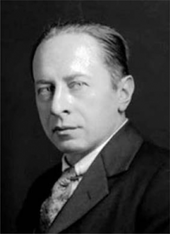
Image of Heinrich Hencky

Heinrich Hencky (2 November 1885 – 6 July 1951) was a German engineer. Born in Ansbach, he studied civil engineering in Munich and received his PhD from the Technische Hochschule Darmstadt. In 1913, he joined a railway company in Kharkiv, Ukraine. On the outbreak of World War I he was interned. After the war he taught at Darmstadt, Dresden and at Delft in the Netherlands.

At Delft University of Technology he worked on slip-line theory, plasticity and rheology, for which he is best known.

In 1930 he went to Massachusetts Institute of Technology and in 1931 gave one of the first lectures on rheology. He returned to Delft and then to Germany. In 1936 he went to Russia, teaching at Kharkiv and Moscow.

Hencky died in a climbing accident at the age of 65.

== See also ==
- Maxwell–Huber–Hencky–von Mises theory
- Hencky strain

== Works ==
- H. Hencky, "Der Spannungszustand in rechteckigen Platten". Mit 12 Abb. im Text und 7 Tafeln. München und Berlin, R. Oldenbourg, 1913
- H. Hencky, "Über einige statisch bestimmte Falle des Gleichgewichts in plastischen Korpern" - Z. Angew. Math. Mech, 1923
- H. Hencky, „Über die Form des Elastizitätsgesetzes bei ideal elastischen Stoffen“. Zeitschrift für technische Physik, 9, 215-220 (1928)
