= Lumped damage mechanics =

Branch of structural mechanics

Lumped damage mechanics or LDM is a branch of structural mechanics that is concerned with the analysis of frame structures. It is based on continuum damage mechanics and fracture mechanics. It combines the ideas of these theories with the concept of plastic hinge LDM can be defined as the fracture mechanics of complex structural systems. In the models of LDM, cracking or local buckling as well as plasticity are lumped at the inelastic hinges. As in continuum damage mechanics, LDM uses state variables to represent the effects of damage on the remaining stiffness and strength of the frame structure. In reinforced concrete structures, the damage state variable quantifies the crack density in the plastic hinge zone; in unreinforced concrete components and steel beams, it is a dimensionless measure of the crack surface; in tubular steel elements, the damage variable measures the degree of local buckling The LDM evolution laws can be derived from continuum damage mechanics or fracture mechanics. In the latter case, concepts such as the energy release rate or the stress intensity factor of a plastic hinge are introduced. LDM allows for the numerical simulation of the collapse of complex structures with a fraction of the computational cost and human effort of its continuum mechanics counterparts. LDM is also a regularization procedure that eliminates the mesh-dependence phenomenon that is observed in structural analysis with local damage models. In addition, LDM method has been implemented in the finite element analysis of crack propagation of steel beam-to-column connections subjected to ultra-low cycle fatigue.
