= Tytus Maksymilian Huber =

Polish mechanical engineer (1872–1950)

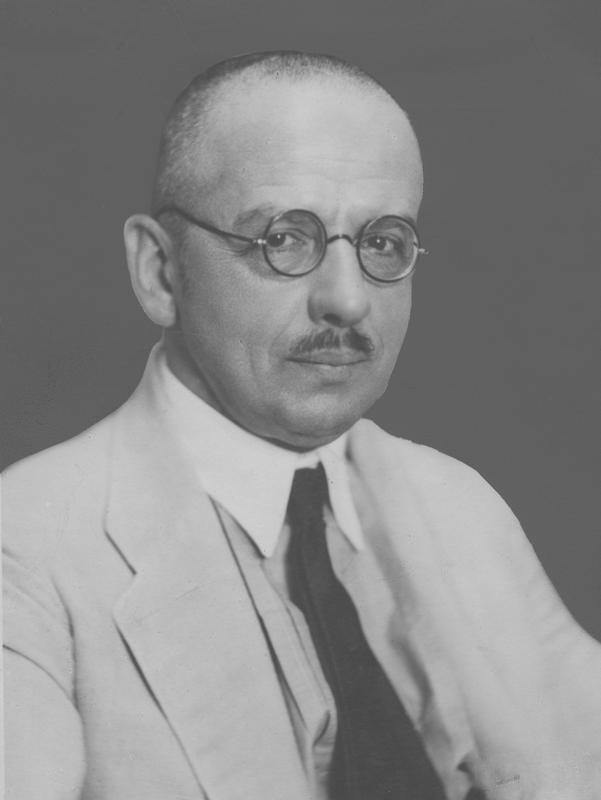
- Huber in 1920s
- Born: 4 January 1872; Krościenko nad Dunajcem, Kingdom of Galicia and Lodomeria
- Died: 9 December 1950 (aged 78); Kraków, Polish People's Republic
- Education: Lwów Polytechnic
- Known for: Huber's equation Huber criterion Maxwell–Huber–Hencky–von Mises theory
- Scientific career
- Fields: Mechanical engineering
- Workplaces: Warsaw University of Technology; AGH University of Science and Technology

Tytus Maksymilian Huber (also known as Maksymilian Tytus Huber; born 4 January 1872 in Krościenko nad Dunajcem – died 9 December 1950 in Kraków) was a Polish mechanical engineer, educator, and scientist known for his work in the fields of strength of materials and the theory of elasticity and plasticity.

== Life and career ==
Born in 1872 in Krościenko nad Dunajcem to father Maksymilian and mother Maria (née Rzesińska). In 1889, he graduated from a gymnasium in Lwów. In 1895, he completed his studies at the Faculty of Engineering of the Lwów Polytechnic (now known as the Lviv Polytechnic). In 1895–1896, he studied mathematics at the Friedrich Wilhelm University in Berlin. In 1899–1905, he worked at the Higher School of Industry in Kraków, and he also taught mathematics at the advanced courses for women in Kraków (1905–1906). He became a professor at the Lwów Polytechnic in 1908.

During World War I, he served in the Austro-Hungarian Army and was involved in the defence of the Przemyśl Fortress. In 1915–1917, he was held in Russian captivity. He stayed in Russia until 1918 and taught physics at a local gymnasium in Kazan. In this period, the scientist familiarized himself with the works of Stephen Timoshenko on the theory of elasticity and strength of materials. After the war, Huber returned to Lwów and resumed work at the Polytechnic where he became its rector in 1921. In 1925, he was elected chairman of the Lwów branch of the Polish Mathematical Society.

In 1928, he moved to Warsaw and worked as a professor and department chair of the Warsaw University of Technology. In 1930, he joined the Standing Committee of the International Society for Testing Materials. In 1933, he became a member of the Temporary Advisory and Scientific Committee (Polish: Tymczasowy Komitet Doradczo-Naukowy), one of the first institutions in Poland established in order to leverage the scientific community to increase the country’s military and economic potential. He was also a member of the Kasa im. Józefa Mianowskiego, a pre-war Polish scientific foundation. He served as head of the Technical Sciences Academy, a scientific society headquartered in Warsaw with the aim of fostering development of technical, mathematical, physical and agricultural sciences in the country.

After the Warsaw Uprising during World War II, Huber was placed in the Dulag 121 camp in Pruszków, a German Nazi transit camp for the cilivian population of Warsaw. He was later transferred to Zakopane. After the end of the war, he relocated to Gdańsk where he helped organize the Gdańsk University of Technology. In 1949, he settled in Kraków. He was named department chair at AGH University of Science and Technology, serving until his death the following year, at the age of 78.

== Work ==
He conducted theoretical research in the field of classical mechanics and strength of materials. Among his greatest accomplishments is the formulation of the tensile stress theorem, an important equation in the study of tension, also known as Huber's equation. In continuum mechanics, he is known for his contributions to the development of the maximum distortion energy criterion. In 1914–29, he developed the theory of ortothropic plates. He authored 13 books and 229 scientific publications during his career.

== Recognition ==
Huber received a number of state decorations including the Commander's Cross of the Order of Polonia Restituta (1925), Golden Cross of Merit (1936, 1948) and the Medal of Victory and Freedom 1945 (1946). He was also awarded honorary doctorates from the AGH University of Kraków (1945), Warsaw University of Technology (1947) and the Gdańsk University of Technology (1950). In 1960, the M/S "Profesor Huber" tanker built in the Gdańsk Shipyard was named in honour of the scientist.

Since 1955, the Polish Academy of Sciences has been awarding the M.T. Huber Prize in recognition of his achievements in the theory of elasticity and plasticity. Several technical high schools in Poland bear his name including in Szczecin, Wałbrzych, Bydgoszcz and Gdynia.

== See also ==
- Yield surface
- Stress–energy tensor
- Maxwell–Huber–Hencky–von Mises theory
- Witold Nowacki
