= Material failure theory =

Science of predicting if, when, and how a given material will fail under loading

Material failure theory is an interdisciplinary field of materials science and solid mechanics which attempts to predict the conditions under which solid materials fail under the action of external loads. The failure of a material is usually classified into brittle failure (fracture) or ductile failure (yield). Depending on the conditions (such as temperature, state of stress, loading rate) most materials can fail in a brittle or ductile manner or both. However, for most practical situations, a material may be classified as either brittle or ductile.

In mathematical terms, failure theory is expressed in the form of various failure criteria which are valid for specific materials. Failure criteria are functions in stress or strain space which separate "failed" states from "unfailed" states. A precise physical definition of a "failed" state is not easily quantified and several working definitions are in use in the engineering community. Quite often, phenomenological failure criteria of the same form are used to predict brittle failure and ductile yields.

== Material failure ==
In materials science, material failure is the loss of load carrying capacity of a material unit. This definition introduces to the fact that material failure can be examined in different scales, from microscopic, to macroscopic. In structural problems, where the structural response may be beyond the initiation of nonlinear material behaviour, material failure is of profound importance for the determination of the integrity of the structure. On the other hand, due to the lack of globally accepted fracture criteria, the determination of the structure's damage, due to material failure, is still under intensive research.

== Types of material failure ==
Material failure can be distinguished in two broader categories depending on the scale in which the material is examined:

=== Microscopic failure ===
Microscopic material failure is defined in terms of crack initiation and propagation. Such methodologies are useful for gaining insight in the cracking of specimens and simple structures under well defined global load distributions. Microscopic failure considers the initiation and propagation of a crack. Failure criteria in this case are related to microscopic fracture. Some of the most popular failure models in this area are the micromechanical failure models, which combine the advantages of continuum mechanics and classical fracture mechanics. Such models are based on the concept that during plastic deformation, microvoids nucleate and grow until a local plastic neck or fracture of the intervoid matrix occurs, which causes the coalescence of neighbouring voids. Such a model, proposed by Gurson and extended by Tvergaard and Needleman, is known as GTN. Another approach, proposed by Rousselier, is based on continuum damage mechanics (CDM) and thermodynamics. Both models form a modification of the von Mises yield potential by introducing a scalar damage quantity, which represents the void volume fraction of cavities, the porosity f.

=== Macroscopic failure ===
Macroscopic material failure is defined in terms of load carrying capacity or energy storage capacity, equivalently. Li presents a classification of macroscopic failure criteria in four categories:

- Stress or strain failure
- Energy type failure (S-criterion, T-criterion)
- Damage failure
- Empirical failure

Five general levels are considered, at which the meaning of deformation and failure is interpreted differently: the structural element scale, the macroscopic scale where macroscopic stress and strain are defined, the mesoscale which is represented by a typical void, the microscale and the atomic scale. The material behavior at one level is considered as a collective of its behavior at a sub-level. An efficient deformation and failure model should be consistent at every level.

== Brittle material failure criteria ==
Failure of brittle materials can be determined using several approaches:

- Phenomenological failure criteria
- Linear elastic fracture mechanics
- Elastic-plastic fracture mechanics
- Energy-based methods
- Cohesive zone methods

=== Phenomenological failure criteria ===
The failure criteria that were developed for brittle solids were the maximum stress/strain criteria. The maximum stress criterion assumes that a material fails when the maximum principal stress $\sigma_1$ in a material element exceeds the uniaxial tensile strength of the material. Alternatively, the material will fail if the minimum principal stress $\sigma_3$ is less than the uniaxial compressive strength of the material. If the uniaxial tensile strength of the material is $\sigma_t$ and the uniaxial compressive strength is $\sigma_c$, then the safe region for the material is assumed to be

$$\sigma_c < \sigma_3 < \sigma_1 < \sigma_t \,$$

Note that the convention that tension is positive has been used in the above expression.

The maximum strain criterion has a similar form except that the principal strains are compared with experimentally determined uniaxial strains at failure, i.e.,

$$\varepsilon_c < \varepsilon_3 < \varepsilon_1 < \varepsilon_t \,$$

The maximum principal stress and strain criteria continue to be widely used in spite of severe shortcomings.

Numerous other phenomenological failure criteria can be found in the engineering literature. The degree of success of these criteria in predicting failure has been limited. Some popular failure criteria for various type of materials are:

- criteria based on invariants of the Cauchy stress tensor
- the Tresca or maximum shear stress failure criterion
- the von Mises or maximum elastic distortional energy criterion
- the Mohr-Coulomb failure criterion for cohesive-frictional solids
- the Drucker-Prager failure criterion for pressure-dependent solids
- the Bresler-Pister failure criterion for concrete
- the Willam-Warnke failure criterion for concrete
- the Hankinson criterion, an empirical failure criterion that is used for orthotropic materials such as wood
- the Hill yield criteria for anisotropic solids
- the Tsai-Wu failure criterion for anisotropic composites
- the Johnson–Holmquist damage model for high-rate deformations of isotropic solids
- the Hoek-Brown failure criterion for rock masses
- the Cam-Clay failure theory for soil

=== Linear elastic fracture mechanics ===
The approach taken in linear elastic fracture mechanics is to estimate the amount of energy needed to grow a preexisting crack in a brittle material. The earliest fracture mechanics approach for unstable crack growth is Griffiths' theory. When applied to the mode I opening of a crack, Griffiths' theory predicts that the critical stress ($\sigma$) needed to propagate the crack is given by

$$\sigma = \sqrt{\cfrac{2 E \gamma}{\pi a}}$$

where $E$ is the Young's modulus of the material, $\gamma$ is the surface energy per unit area of the crack, and $a$ is the crack length for edge cracks or $2a$ is the crack length for plane cracks. The quantity $\sigma\sqrt{\pi a}$ is postulated as a material parameter called the fracture toughness. The mode I fracture toughness for plane strain is defined as

$$K_{\rm Ic} = Y\sigma_c\sqrt{\pi a}$$

where $\sigma_c$ is a critical value of the far field stress and $Y$ is a dimensionless factor that depends on the geometry, material properties, and loading condition. The quantity $K_{\rm Ic}$ is related to the stress intensity factor and is determined experimentally. Similar quantities $K_{\rm IIc}$ and $K_{\rm IIIc}$ can be determined for mode II and model III loading conditions.

The state of stress around cracks of various shapes can be expressed in terms of their stress intensity factors. Linear elastic fracture mechanics predicts that a crack will extend when the stress intensity factor at the crack tip is greater than the fracture toughness of the material. Therefore, the critical applied stress can also be determined once the stress intensity factor at a crack tip is known.

=== Energy-based methods ===
The linear elastic fracture mechanics method is difficult to apply for anisotropic materials (such as composites) or for situations where the loading or the geometry are complex. The strain energy release rate approach has proved quite useful for such situations. The strain energy release rate for a mode I crack which runs through the thickness of a plate is defined as

$$G_I = \cfrac{P}{2t}~\cfrac{du}{da}$$

where $P$ is the applied load, $t$ is the thickness of the plate, $u$ is the displacement at the point of application of the load due to crack growth, and $a$ is the crack length for edge cracks or $2a$ is the crack length for plane cracks. The crack is expected to propagate when the strain energy release rate exceeds a critical value $G_{\rm Ic}$ - called the critical strain energy release rate.

The fracture toughness and the critical strain energy release rate for plane stress are related by

$$G_{\rm Ic} = \cfrac{1}{E}~K_{\rm Ic}^2$$

where $E$ is the Young's modulus. If an initial crack size is known, then a critical stress can be determined using the strain energy release rate criterion.

== Ductile material failure (yield) criteria ==
A yield criterion often expressed as yield surface, or yield locus, is a hypothesis concerning the limit of elasticity under any combination of stresses. There are two interpretations of yield criterion: one is purely mathematical in taking a statistical approach while other models attempt to provide a justification based on established physical principles. Since stress and strain are tensor qualities they can be described on the basis of three principal directions, in the case of stress these are denoted by $\sigma_1 \,\!$, $\sigma_2 \,\!$, and $\sigma_3 \,\!$.

The following represent the most common yield criterion as applied to an isotropic material (uniform properties in all directions). Other equations have been proposed or are used in specialist situations.

=== Isotropic yield criteria ===
Maximum principal stress theory – by William Rankine (1850). Yield occurs when the largest principal stress exceeds the uniaxial tensile yield strength. Although this criterion allows for a quick and easy comparison with experimental data it is rarely suitable for design purposes. This theory gives good predictions for brittle materials.

$\sigma_1 \le \sigma_y \,\!$

Maximum principal strain theory – by St.Venant. Yield occurs when the maximum principal strain reaches the strain corresponding to the yield point during a simple tensile test. In terms of the principal stresses this is determined by the equation:

$\sigma_1 - \nu\left(\sigma_2 + \sigma_3\right) \le \sigma_y. \,\!$

Maximum shear stress theory – Also known as the Tresca yield criterion, after the French scientist Henri Tresca. This assumes that yield occurs when the shear stress $\tau\!$ exceeds the shear yield strength $\tau_y\!$:

$\tau = \frac{\sigma_1 - \sigma_3}{2} \le \tau_y. \,\!$

Total strain energy theory – This theory assumes that the stored energy associated with elastic deformation at the point of yield is independent of the specific stress tensor. Thus yield occurs when the strain energy per unit volume is greater than the strain energy at the elastic limit in simple tension. For a 3-dimensional stress state this is given by:

$\sigma_{1}^2 + \sigma_{2}^2 + \sigma_{3}^2 - 2 \nu \left(\sigma_1 \sigma_2 + \sigma_2 \sigma_3 + \sigma_1 \sigma_3\right) \le \sigma_y^2. \,\!$

Maximum distortion energy theory (von Mises yield criterion) also referred to as octahedral shear stress theory. – This theory proposes that the total strain energy can be separated into two components: the volumetric (hydrostatic) strain energy and the shape (distortion or shear) strain energy. It is proposed that yield occurs when the distortion component exceeds that at the yield point for a simple tensile test. This theory is also known as the von Mises yield criterion.

The yield surfaces corresponding to these criteria have a range of forms. However, most isotropic yield criteria correspond to convex yield surfaces.

=== Anisotropic yield criteria ===
When a metal is subjected to large plastic deformations the grain sizes and orientations change in the direction of deformation. As a result, the plastic yield behavior of the material shows directional dependency. Under such circumstances, the isotropic yield criteria such as the von Mises yield criterion are unable to predict the yield behavior accurately. Several anisotropic yield criteria have been developed to deal with such situations. Some of the more popular anisotropic yield criteria are:

- Hill's quadratic yield criterion
- Generalized Hill yield criterion
- Hosford yield criterion

=== Yield surface ===
The yield surface of a ductile material usually changes as the material experiences increased deformation. Models for the evolution of the yield surface with increasing strain, temperature, and strain rate are used in conjunction with the above failure criteria for isotropic hardening, kinematic hardening, and viscoplasticity. Some such models are:

- the Johnson-Cook model
- the Steinberg-Guinan model
- the Zerilli-Armstrong model
- the Mechanical threshold stress model
- the Preston-Tonks-Wallace model

There is another important aspect to ductile materials - the prediction of the ultimate failure strength of a ductile material. Several models for predicting the ultimate strength have been used by the engineering community with varying levels of success. For metals, such failure criteria are usually expressed in terms of a combination of porosity and strain to failure or in terms of a damage parameter.

== See also ==
- Creep (deformation)
- Fracture mechanics
- Fracture
- Stress intensity factor
- Yield (engineering)
- Yield surface
- Plasticity (physics)
- Structural failure
- Strength of materials
- Ultimate failure
- Damage mechanics
- Size effect on structural strength
- Concrete fracture analysis
