= Johnson–Holmquist damage model =

In solid mechanics, the Johnson–Holmquist damage model is used to model the mechanical behavior of damaged brittle materials, such as ceramics, rocks, and concrete, over a range of strain rates. Such materials usually have high compressive strength but low tensile strength and tend to exhibit progressive damage under load due to the growth of microfractures.

There are two variations of the Johnson-Holmquist model that are used to model the impact performance of ceramics under ballistically delivered loads. These models were developed by Gordon R. Johnson and Timothy J. Holmquist in the 1990s with the aim of facilitating predictive numerical simulations of ballistic armor penetration. The first version of the model is called the 1992 Johnson-Holmquist 1 (JH-1) model. This original version was developed to account for large deformations but did not take into consideration progressive damage with increasing deformation; though the multi-segment stress-strain curves in the model can be interpreted as incorporating damage implicitly. The second version, developed in 1994, incorporated a damage evolution rule and is called the Johnson-Holmquist 2 (JH-2) model or, more accurately, the Johnson-Holmquist damage material model.

== Johnson-Holmquist 2 (JH-2) material model ==
The Johnson-Holmquist material model (JH-2), with damage, is useful when modeling brittle materials, such as ceramics, subjected to large pressures, shear strain and high strain rates. The model attempts to include the phenomena encountered when brittle materials are subjected to load and damage, and is one of the most widely used models when dealing with ballistic impact on ceramics. The model simulates the increase in strength shown by ceramics subjected to hydrostatic pressure as well as the reduction in strength shown by damaged ceramics. This is done by basing the model on two sets of curves that plot the yield stress against the pressure. The first set of curves accounts for the intact material, while the second one accounts for the failed material. Each curve set depends on the plastic strain and plastic strain rate. A damage variable D accounts for the level of fracture.

=== Intact elastic behavior ===
The JH-2 material assumes that the material is initially elastic and isotropic and can be described by a relation of the form (summation is implied over repeated indices)

$$\sigma_{ij} = -p(\epsilon_{kk})~\delta_{ij} + 2~\mu~\epsilon_{ij}$$

where $\sigma_{ij}$ is a stress measure, $p(\epsilon_{kk})$ is an equation of state for the pressure, $\delta_{ij}$ is the Kronecker delta, $\epsilon_{ij}$ is a strain measure that is energy conjugate to $\sigma_{ij}$, and $\mu$ is a shear modulus. The quantity $\epsilon_{kk}$ is frequently replaced by the hydrostatic compression $\xi$ so that the equation of state is expressed as

$$p(\xi) = p(\xi(\epsilon_{kk})) = p\left(\cfrac{\rho}{\rho_0}-1\right) ~;~~ \xi := \cfrac{\rho}{\rho_0}-1$$

where $\rho$ is the current mass density and $\rho_0$ is the initial mass density.

The stress at the Hugoniot elastic limit is assumed to be given by a relation of the form

$$\sigma_h = \mathcal{H}(\rho, \mu) = p_{\rm HEL}(\rho) + \cfrac{2}{3}~\sigma_{\rm HEL}(\rho, \mu)$$

where $p_{\rm HEL}$ is the pressure at the Hugoniot elastic limit and $\sigma_{\rm HEL}$ is the stress at the Hugoniot elastic limit.

=== Intact material strength ===
The uniaxial failure strength of the intact material is assumed to be given by an equation of the form

$$\sigma^{*}_{\rm intact} = A~(p^* + T^*)^n~\left[1 + C~\ln\left(\cfrac{d\epsilon_p}{dt}\right)\right]$$

where $A, C, n$ are material constants, $t$ is the time, $\epsilon_p$ is the inelastic strain. The inelastic strain rate is usually normalized by a reference strain rate to remove the time dependence. The reference strain rate is generally 1/s.

The quantities $\sigma^{*}$ and $p^*$ are normalized stresses and $T^*$ is a normalized tensile hydrostatic pressure, defined as

$$\sigma^* = \cfrac{\sigma}{\sigma_{\rm HEL}} ~;~
p^* = \cfrac{p}{p_{\rm HEL}} ~;~~ T^* = \cfrac{T}{p_{\rm HEL}}$$

=== Stress at complete fracture ===
The uniaxial stress at complete fracture is assumed to be given by

$$\sigma^{*}_{\rm fracture} = B~(p^*)^m~\left[1 + C~\ln\left(\cfrac{d\epsilon_p}{dt}\right)\right]$$

where $B, C, m$ are material constants.

=== Current material strength ===
The uniaxial strength of the material at a given state of damage is then computed at a linear interpolation between the initial strength and the stress for complete failure, and is given by

$$\sigma^{*} = \sigma^{*}_{\rm initial} - D~\left(\sigma^{*}_{\rm initial} - \sigma^{*}_{\rm fracture}\right)$$

The quantity $D$ is a scalar variable that indicates damage accumulation.

=== Damage evolution rule ===
The evolution of the damage variable $D$ is given by

$$\cfrac{dD}{dt} = \cfrac{1}{\epsilon_f}~\cfrac{d\epsilon_p}{dt}$$

where the strain to failure $\epsilon_f$ is assumed to be

$$\epsilon_f = D_1~(p^* + T^*)^{D_2}$$

where $D_1, D_2$ are material constants.

=== Material parameters for some ceramics ===
material	$\rho_0$	$\mu$	A	B	C	m	n	$D_1$	$D_2$	$\sigma_h$	Reference
	(kg-m^{−3})	(GPa)								(GPa)	
Boron carbide $B_4C$	2510	197	0.927	0.7	0.005	0.85	0.67	0.001	0.5	19	
Silicon carbide $SiC$	3163	183	0.96	0.35	0	1	0.65	0.48	0.48	14.6	
Aluminum nitride $AlN$	3226	127	0.85	0.31	0.013	0.21	0.29	0.02	1.85	9	
Alumina $Al_2O_3$	3700	90	0.93	0.31	0	0.6	0.6	0.005	1	2.8	
Silicafloat glass	2530	30	0.93	0.088	0.003	0.35	0.77	0.053	0.85	6	

== Johnson–Holmquist equation of state ==
The function $p(\xi)$ used in the Johnson–Holmquist material model is often called the Johnson–Holmquist equation of state and has the form

$$p(\xi) = \begin{cases}
k_1~\xi + k_2~\xi^2 + k_3~\xi^3 + \Delta p & \qquad \text{Compression} \\
k_1~\xi  & \qquad \text{Tension}
\end{cases}$$

where $\Delta p$ is an increment in the pressure and $k_1, k_2, k_3$ are material constants. The increment in pressure arises from the conversion of energy loss due to damage into internal energy. Frictional effects are neglected.

== Implementation in LS-DYNA ==
The Johnson-Holmquist material model is implemented in LS-DYNA as * MAT_JOHNSON_HOLMQUIST_CERAMICS.

== Implementation in the IMPETUS Afea Solver ==
The Johnson-Holmquist material model is implemented in the IMPETUS Afea Solver as * MAT_JH_CERAMIC.

== Implementation in Altair Radioss and OpenRadioss ==
The Johnson-Holmquist material model is implemented in Radioss Solver as /MAT/LAW79 (JOHN_HOLM).

== Implementation in Abaqus ==
The Johnson-Holmquist (JH-2) material model is implemented in Abaqus as ABQ_JH2 material name.

== See also ==
- Failure
- Material failure theory
