= Dusan Krajcinovic =

American scientist (1935–2007)

- Born: Belgrade 1935; Zagreb, Kingdom of Yugoslavia (now Croatia)
- Died: 10 August 2007; Arizona, USA
- Education: University of Belgrade
- Known for: Damage mechanics
- Scientific career
- Fields: Mechanics
- Workplaces: Arizona State University
- Doctoral advisor: George Hermann Northwestern University

Dusan Krajcinovic (died 2007) was a mechanics scientist. He was past member and chair of the Applied Mechanics Division of ASME. He served a term on the U. S. National Committee on Theoretical and Applied Mechanics. He authored a review paper on damage mechanics that predates his book on the same subject.

He earned his bachelor's and master's degrees in Civil Engineering from the University of Belgrade (1958, 1966) before emigrating to the US. He earned his PhD in Civil Engineering from Northwestern University in 1968, working with Prof. George Hermann. He worked at Ingersoll Rand Research Inc. (1969) and Argonne National Laboratory (1973), before becoming Professor of Civil Engineering at University of Illinois, Chicago, IL (1973-1989) and then Professor of Mechanical and Aerospace Engineering at Arizona State University (ASU), until retiring as Professor Emeritus in 2004. He received the October Prize for Mathematical, Physical, and Engineering Science (Belgrade, Yugoslavia, 1990), the Gold Medal for achievements in Science and Technology (Crete, 1999), and Laurea Honoris Causa (Milan, Italy, 2001).

He was ASME Fellow and Chair of AMD Executive Committee (2001-2002), Fellow of the American Academy of Mechanics and President (1999-2001), as well as Member of the Stability Research Council, the International Association for Structural Engineering in Reactor Technology, and non-member advisor of the ASCE Committee for Inelastic Behavior of Materials). he served on the editorial boards of Applied Mechanics Reviews and Mechanics of Materials, and was editor of the International Journal of Damage Mechanics.
