= Huber's equation =

Huber's equation, first derived by a Polish engineer Tytus Maksymilian Huber, is a basic formula in elastic material tension calculations, an equivalent of the equation of state, but applying to solids. In most simple expression and commonly in use it looks like this:

$\sigma_{red}=\sqrt{({\sigma}^2) + 3({\tau}^2)}$

where $\sigma$ is the tensile stress, and $\tau$ is the shear stress, measured in newtons per square meter (N/m^{2}, also called pascals, Pa), while $\sigma_{red}$—called a reduced tension—is the resultant tension of the material.

Finds application in calculating the span width of the bridges, their beam cross-sections, etc.

== See also ==
- Yield surface
- Stress–energy tensor
- Tensile stress
- von Mises yield criterion
