= Richard M. Christensen =

American academic writer

- Born: July 3, 1932
- Died: 12 April 2024 (aged 91)
- Occupation: Academic writer
- Awards: William Prager Medal (1989); Timoshenko Medal (2013)

Academic background
- Education: Yale University (DEng)

Richard M. Christensen was an American academic writer and professor of engineering.

== Biography ==
Richard Monson Christensen was born July 3, 1932, in Idaho Falls, Idaho. He earned his bachelor’s degree in civil engineering at the University of Utah in 1955, and went on to earn his master’s in engineering at Yale University in 1956.

Christensen completed his D.Eng. from Yale University in 1961.

Christensen began his career at the University of California, Berkeley. In 1967, he left his teaching job and joined Shell plc as a research engineer. Later, he again joined academia and was affiliated with universities such as the University of Houston and Washington University in St. Louis.

In 1988, he joined UC Davis and served as a professor until July 1994, when he became a professor research emeritus at Stanford University.

In 1987, he was elected as a member of the National Academy of Engineering.

In 2013, he received the Timoshenko Medal.

His book, The Theory of Materials Failure has been reviewed by Contemporary Physics.

== Awards ==
- Worcester Reed Warner Gold Medal (1988)
- William Prager Medal
- Timoshenko Medal (2013)

== Books ==
- Theory of viscoelasticity: an introduction (1971)
- The Theory of Materials Failure (2013)
