= Tsai–Wu failure criterion =

Test for predicting engineering failures

The Tsai–Wu failure criterion is a phenomenological material failure theory which is widely used for anisotropic composite materials which have different strengths in tension and compression. The Tsai-Wu criterion predicts failure when the failure index in a laminate reaches 1. This failure criterion is a specialization of the general quadratic failure criterion proposed by Gol'denblat and Kopnov and can be expressed in the form

$$F_i~\sigma_i + F_{ij}~\sigma_i~\sigma_j \le 1$$

where $ij=1\dots 6$ and repeated indices indicate summation, and $F_i, F_{ij}$ are experimentally determined material strength parameters. The stresses $\sigma_i$ are expressed in Voigt notation. If the failure surface is to be closed and convex, the interaction terms $F_{ij}$ must satisfy

$$F_{ii}F_{jj} - F_{ij}^2 \ge 0$$

which implies that all the $F_{ii}$ terms must be positive.

== Tsai–Wu failure criterion for orthotropic materials ==
For orthotropic materials with three planes of symmetry oriented with the coordinate directions, if we assume that $F_{ij} = F_{ji}$ and that there is no coupling between the normal and shear stress terms (and between the shear terms), the general form of the Tsai–Wu failure criterion reduces to

$$\begin{align}
F_1\sigma_1 + & F_2\sigma_2 + F_3\sigma_3 + F_4\sigma_4 + F_5\sigma_5 + F_6\sigma_6\\
& + F_{11}\sigma_1^2 + F_{22}\sigma_2^2 + F_{33}\sigma_3^2 + F_{44}\sigma_4^2 + F_{55}\sigma_{5}^2 + F_{66}\sigma_6^2 \\
& \qquad + 2F_{12}\sigma_1\sigma_2 + 2F_{13}\sigma_1\sigma_3 + 2F_{23}\sigma_2\sigma_3 \le 1
\end{align}$$

Let the failure strength in uniaxial tension and compression in the three directions of anisotropy be $\sigma_{1t},\sigma_{1c},\sigma_{2t},\sigma_{2c},\sigma_{3t},\sigma_{3c}$. Also, let us assume that the shear strengths in the three planes of symmetry are $\tau_{23},\tau_{12},\tau_{31}$ (and have the same magnitude on a plane even if the signs are different). Then the coefficients of the orthotropic Tsai–Wu failure criterion are

$$\begin{align}
F_1 = & \cfrac{1}{\sigma_{1t}}-\cfrac{1}{\sigma_{1c}} ~;~~
F_2 = \cfrac{1}{\sigma_{2t}}-\cfrac{1}{\sigma_{2c}} ~;~~
F_3 = \cfrac{1}{\sigma_{3t}}-\cfrac{1}{\sigma_{3c}} ~;~~
F_4 = F_5 = F_6 = 0 \\
F_{11} = & \cfrac{1}{\sigma_{1c}\sigma_{1t}} ~;~~
F_{22} = \cfrac{1}{\sigma_{2c}\sigma_{2t}} ~;~~
F_{33} = \cfrac{1}{\sigma_{3c}\sigma_{3t}} ~;~~
F_{44} = \cfrac{1}{\tau_{23}^2} ~;~~ F_{55} = \cfrac{1}{\tau_{31}^2} ~;~~ F_{66} = \cfrac{1}{\tau_{12}^2} \\
\end{align}$$

The coefficients $F_{12},F_{13},F_{23}$ can be determined using equibiaxial tests. If the failure strengths in equibiaxial tension are $\sigma_1=\sigma_2=\sigma_{b12}, \sigma_1=\sigma_3=\sigma_{b13}, \sigma_2=\sigma_3=\sigma_{b23}$ then

$$\begin{align}
F_{12} &= \cfrac{1}{2\sigma_{b12}^2}\left[1-\sigma_{b12}(F_1+F_2)-\sigma_{b12}^2(F_{11}+F_{22})\right]\\
F_{13} &= \cfrac{1}{2\sigma_{b13}^2}\left[1-\sigma_{b13}(F_1+F_3)-\sigma_{b13}^2(F_{11}+F_{33})\right] \\
F_{23} &= \cfrac{1}{2\sigma_{b23}^2}\left[1-\sigma_{b23}(F_2+F_3)-\sigma_{b23}^2(F_{22}+F_{33})\right]
\end{align}$$

The near impossibility of performing these equibiaxial tests has led to there being a severe lack of experimental data on the parameters $F_{12}, F_{13}, F_{23}$. Instead, the following approximation, originally proposed by Tsai, is often used:

$$\begin{align}
F_{xy} = -\frac{{\sqrt{F_{xx}F_{yy}}}}{2}
\end{align}$$

This ensures the interaction term lies within the bounds for which the yield envolope is an ellipse.

It can be shown that the Tsai-Wu criterion is a particular case of the generalized Hill yield criterion.

== Tsai-Wu failure criterion for transversely isotropic materials ==
For a transversely isotropic material, if the plane of isotropy is 1–2, then

$$F_1=F_2 ~;~~ F_4=F_5=F_6=0 ~;~~ F_{11}=F_{22} ~;~~ F_{44}=F_{55} ~;~~ F_{13}=F_{23} ~.$$

Then the Tsai–Wu failure criterion reduces to

$$\begin{align}
F_2(\sigma_1 + \sigma_2) & + F_3\sigma_3 + F_{22}(\sigma_1^2 + \sigma_2^2) + F_{33}\sigma_3^2 + F_{44}(\sigma_4^2 + \sigma_{5}^2) + F_{66}\sigma_6^2 \\
& \qquad + 2F_{12}\sigma_1\sigma_2 + 2F_{23}(\sigma_1+\sigma_2)\sigma_3 \le 1
\end{align}$$

where $F_{66} = 2(F_{11}-F_{12})$. This theory is applicable to a unidirectional composite lamina where the fiber direction is in the '3'-direction.

In order to maintain closed and ellipsoidal failure surfaces for all stress states, Tsai and Wu also proposed stability conditions which take the following form for transversely isotropic materials

$$F_{22}~F_{33} - F_{23}^2 \ge 0 ~;~~ F_{11}^2-F_{12}^2 \ge 0 ~.$$

=== Tsai–Wu failure criterion in plane stress ===
For the case of plane stress with $\sigma_1 = \sigma_5 = \sigma_6 = 0$, the Tsai–Wu failure criterion reduces to

$$F_2\sigma_2 + F_3\sigma_3 + F_{22}\sigma_2^2 + F_{33}\sigma_3^2 + F_{44}\sigma_4^2
+ 2F_{23}\sigma_2\sigma_3 \le 1$$

The strengths in the expressions for $F_i, F_{ij}$ may be interpreted, in the case of a lamina, as $\sigma_{1c}$ = transverse compressive strength, $\sigma_{1t}$ = transverse tensile strength, $\sigma_{3c}$ = longitudinal compressive strength, $\sigma_{3t}$ = longitudinal tensile strength, $\tau_{23}$ = longitudinal shear strength, $\tau_{12}$ = transverse shear strength.

== Tsai–Wu criterion for foams ==
The Tsai–Wu criterion for closed cell PVC foams under plane strain conditions may be expressed as

$$F_2\sigma_2 + F_3\sigma_3 + F_{22}\sigma_2^2 + F_{33}\sigma_3^2
+ 2F_{23}\sigma_2\sigma_3  = 1 - k^2$$

where

$$F_{23} = - \cfrac{1}{2}\sqrt{F_{22} F_{33}} ~;~~ k = \cfrac{\sigma_4}{\tau_{23}} ~.$$

For DIAB Divinycell H250 PVC foam (density 250 kg/cu.m.), the values of the strengths are $\sigma_{2c}=4.6$MPa, $\sigma_{2t}=7.3$MPa, $\sigma_{3c}=6.3$MPa, $\sigma_{3t}=10$MPa.

For aluminum foams in plane stress, a simplified form of the Tsai–Wu criterion may be used if we assume that the tensile and compressive failure strengths are the same and that there are no shear effects on the failure strength. This criterion may be written as

$$3~\tilde{J}_2 + (\eta^2 - 1)~\tilde{I}_1^2 = \eta^2$$

where

$$\tilde{J}_2 := \tfrac{1}{3}\left(\cfrac{\sigma_1^2}{\sigma_{1c}^2} - \cfrac{\sigma_1\sigma_2}{\sigma_{1c}\sigma_{2c}} + \cfrac{\sigma_2^2}{\sigma_{2c}^2}\right) ~;~~
\tilde{I}_1 := \cfrac{\sigma_1}{\sigma_{1c}} + \cfrac{\sigma_2}{\sigma_{2c}}$$

== Tsai–Wu criterion for bone ==
The Tsai–Wu failure criterion has also been applied to trabecular bone/cancellous bone with varying degrees of success. The quantity $F_{12}$ has been shown to have a nonlinear dependence on the density of the bone.

== See also ==
- Material failure theory
- Yield (engineering)
