= Modified compression field theory =

The modified compression field theory (MCFT) is a general model for the load-deformation behaviour of two-dimensional cracked reinforced concrete subjected to shear. It models concrete considering concrete stresses in principal directions summed with reinforcing stresses assumed to be only axial. The concrete stress-strain behaviour was derived originally from Vecchio's tests and has since been confirmed with about 250 experiments performed on two large special purpose testing machines at the University of Toronto. Similar machines have been built in Japan and the United States, providing additional confirmation of the quality of the method's predictions.

The most important assumption in the MCFT model is that the cracked concrete in reinforced concrete can be treated as a new material with empirically defined stress–strain behaviour. This behaviour can differ from the traditional stress–strain curve of a cylinder, for example. The strains used for these stress–strain relationships are average strains, that is, they lump together the combined effects of local strains at cracks, strains between cracks, bond-slip, and crack slip. The calculated stresses are also average stresses in that they implicitly include stresses between cracks, stresses at cracks, interface shear on cracks, and dowel action. For the use of these average stresses and strains to be a reasonable assumption, the distances used in determining the average behaviour must include a few cracks.

== History ==
Frank J. Vecchio defined the original form of MCFT in 1982 from the testing of 30 reinforced concrete panels subjected to uniform strain states in a specially built tester. The theory of MCFT traces back through the compression field theory of 1978 to the Diagonal compression Field Theory of 1974. The definitive description of the MCFT is in the 1986 American Concrete Institute paper "The Modified Compression Field Theory for Reinforced Concrete Elements Subjected to Shear".
