= Von Mises yield criterion =

Failure Theory in continuum mechanics

In continuum mechanics, the maximum distortion energy criterion (also von Mises yield criterion) states that yielding of a ductile material begins when the second invariant of deviatoric stress $J_2$ reaches a critical value. It is a part of plasticity theory that mostly applies to ductile materials, such as some metals. Prior to yield, material response can be assumed to be of a linear elastic, nonlinear elastic, or viscoelastic behavior.

In materials science and engineering, the von Mises yield criterion is also formulated in terms of the von Mises stress or equivalent tensile stress, $\sigma_\text{v}$. This is a scalar value of stress that can be computed from the Cauchy stress tensor. In this case, a material is said to start yielding when the von Mises stress reaches a value known as yield strength, $\sigma_\text{y}$. The von Mises stress is used to predict yielding of materials under complex loading from the results of uniaxial tensile tests. The von Mises stress satisfies the property where two stress states with equal distortion energy have an equal von Mises stress.

Because the von Mises yield criterion is independent of the first stress invariant, $I_1$, it is applicable for the analysis of plastic deformation for ductile materials such as metals, as onset of yield for these materials does not depend on the hydrostatic component of the stress tensor.

Although it has been believed it was formulated by James Clerk Maxwell in 1865, Maxwell only described the general conditions in a letter to William Thomson (Lord Kelvin). Richard Edler von Mises rigorously formulated it in 1913. Tytus Maksymilian Huber (1904), in a paper written in Polish, anticipated to some extent this criterion by properly relying on the distortion strain energy, not on the total strain energy as his predecessors. Heinrich Hencky formulated the same criterion as von Mises independently in 1924. For the above reasons this criterion is also referred to as the "Maxwell–Huber–Hencky–von Mises theory".

== Mathematical formulation ==
The von Mises yield surfaces in principal stress coordinates circumscribes a cylinder with radius $\sqrt{\frac{2}{3}} \sigma_y$ around the hydrostatic axis. Also shown is Tresca's hexagonal yield surface.

Mathematically the von Mises yield criterion is expressed as:

$$J_2 = k^2\,\!$$

Here $k$ is yield stress of the material in pure shear. As shown later in this article, at the onset of yielding, the magnitude of the shear yield stress in pure shear is √3 times lower than the tensile yield stress in the case of simple tension. Thus, we have:

$$k = \frac{\sigma_y}{\sqrt{3}}$$

where $\sigma_y$ is tensile yield strength of the material. If we set the von Mises stress equal to the yield strength and combine the above equations, the von Mises yield criterion is written as:

$$\sigma_v = \sigma_y = \sqrt{3J_2}$$

or

$$\sigma_v^2 = 3J_2 = 3k^2$$

Substituting $J_2$ with the Cauchy stress tensor components, we get

$$\sigma_\text{v}^2 = \frac{1}{2}\left[(\sigma_{11} - \sigma_{22})^2 + (\sigma_{22} - \sigma_{33})^2 + (\sigma_{33} - \sigma_{11})^2 + 6\left(\sigma_{23}^2 + \sigma_{31}^2 + \sigma_{12}^2\right)\right] = \frac{3}{2}s_{ij}s_{ij}$$,

where $s$ is called deviatoric stress. This equation defines the yield surface as a circular cylinder (See Figure) whose yield curve, or intersection with the deviatoric plane, is a circle with radius $\sqrt{2}k$, or $\sqrt{\frac{2}{3}} \sigma_y$. This implies that the yield condition is independent of hydrostatic stresses.

== Reduced von Mises equation for different stress conditions ==
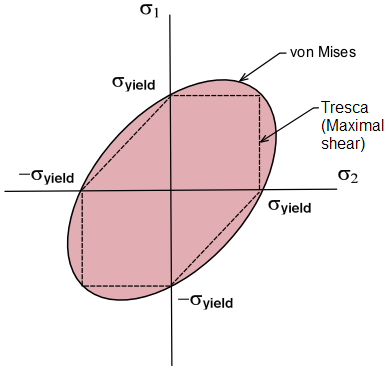
Von Mises yield criterion in 2D (planar) loading conditions: if stress in the third dimension is zero ($\sigma_3 = 0$), no yielding is predicted to occur for stress coordinates $\sigma_1, \sigma_2$ within the red area. Because Tresca's criterion for yielding is within the red area, Von Mises' criterion is more lax.

=== Uniaxial (1D) stress ===
In the case of uniaxial stress or simple tension, $\sigma_1 \neq 0, \sigma_3 = \sigma_2 = 0$, the von Mises criterion simply reduces to

$$\sigma_1 = \sigma_\text{y}\,\!$$,

which means the material starts to yield when $\sigma_1$ reaches the yield strength of the material $\sigma_\text{y}$, in agreement with the definition of tensile (or compressive) yield strength.

=== Multi-axial (2D or 3D) stress ===
An equivalent tensile stress or equivalent von-Mises stress, $\sigma_\text{v}$ is used to predict yielding of materials under multiaxial loading conditions using results from simple uniaxial tensile tests. Thus, we define

$$\begin{align}
\sigma_\text{v}
&= \sqrt{3J_2} \\
&= \sqrt{\frac{(\sigma_{11} - \sigma_{22})^2 + (\sigma_{22} - \sigma_{33})^2 + \left(\sigma_{33} - \sigma_{11})^2 + 6(\sigma_{12}^2 + \sigma_{23}^2 + \sigma_{31}^2\right)}{2}} \\
&= \sqrt{\frac{(\sigma_1 - \sigma_2)^2 + (\sigma_2 - \sigma_3)^2 + (\sigma_3 - \sigma_1)^2} {2}} \\
&= \sqrt{\frac{3}{2} s_{ij}s_{ij}}
\end{align}
\,\!$$

where $s_{ij}$ are components of stress deviator tensor $\boldsymbol{\sigma}^\text{dev}$:

$$\boldsymbol{\sigma}^\text{dev} = \boldsymbol{\sigma} - \frac{\operatorname{tr}\left(\boldsymbol{\sigma}\right)}{3} \mathbf{I}\,\!$$.

In this case, yielding occurs when the equivalent stress, $\sigma_\text{v}$, reaches the yield strength of the material in simple tension, $\sigma_\text{y}$. As an example, the stress state of a steel beam in compression differs from the stress state of a steel axle under torsion, even if both specimens are of the same material. In view of the stress tensor, which fully describes the stress state, this difference manifests in six degrees of freedom, because the stress tensor has six independent components. Therefore, it is difficult to tell which of the two specimens is closer to the yield point or has even reached it. However, by means of the von Mises yield criterion, which depends solely on the value of the scalar von Mises stress, i.e., one degree of freedom, this comparison is straightforward: A larger von Mises value implies that the material is closer to the yield point.

In the case of pure shear stress, $\sigma_{12} = \sigma_{21}\neq0$, while all other $\sigma_{ij} = 0$, von Mises criterion becomes:

$$\sigma_{12} = k = \frac{\sigma_y}{\sqrt{3}}\,\!$$.

This means that, at the onset of yielding, the magnitude of the shear stress in pure shear is $\sqrt{3}$ times lower than the yield stress in the case of simple tension. The von Mises yield criterion for pure shear stress, expressed in principal stresses, is

$$(\sigma_1 - \sigma_2)^2 + (\sigma_2 - \sigma_3)^2 + (\sigma_1 - \sigma_3)^2 = 2\sigma_y^2\,\!$$

In the case of principal plane stress, $\sigma_3 = 0$ and $\sigma_{12} = \sigma_{23} = \sigma_{31} = 0$, the von Mises criterion becomes:

$$\sigma_1^2 - \sigma_1\sigma_2 + \sigma_2^2 = 3k^2 = \sigma_y^2\,\!$$

This equation represents an ellipse in the plane $\sigma_1 - \sigma_2$.

=== Summary ===
State of stress	Boundary conditions	von Mises equations
General	No restrictions	$\sigma_\text{v} = \sqrt{\frac{1}{2}\left[(\sigma_{11} - \sigma_{22})^2 + (\sigma_{22} - \sigma_{33})^2 + (\sigma_{33} - \sigma_{11})^2\right] + 3\left(\sigma_{12}^2 + \sigma_{23}^2 + \sigma_{31}^2\right)}$
Principal stresses	$\sigma_{12} = \sigma_{31} = \sigma_{23} = 0\!$	$\sigma_\text{v} = \sqrt{\frac{1}{2}\left[(\sigma_1 - \sigma_2)^2 + (\sigma_2 - \sigma_3)^2 + (\sigma_3 - \sigma_1)^2\right]}$
General plane stress	$$\begin{align} \sigma_3 &= 0\! \\ \sigma_{31} &= \sigma_{23} = 0\! \end{align}$$	$\sigma_\text{v} = \sqrt{\sigma_{11}^2 - \sigma_{11}\sigma_{22} + \sigma_{22}^2+3\sigma_{12}^2}\!$
Principal plane stress	$$\begin{align} \sigma_3 &= 0\! \\ \sigma_{12} &= \sigma_{31} = \sigma_{23} = 0\! \end{align}$$	$\sigma_\text{v} = \sqrt{\sigma_1^2 + \sigma_2^2 - \sigma_1\sigma_2 }\!$
Pure shear	$$\begin{align} \sigma_1 &= \sigma_2 = \sigma_3 = 0\! \\ \sigma_{31} &= \sigma_{23} = 0\! \end{align}$$	$\sigma_\text{v} = \sqrt{3} |\sigma_{12}|\!$
Uniaxial	$$\begin{align} \sigma_2 &= \sigma_3 = 0\! \\ \sigma_{12} &= \sigma_{31} = \sigma_{23} = 0\! \end{align}$$	$\sigma_\text{v} = \sigma_1\!$

== Physical interpretation of the von Mises yield criterion ==
Hencky (1924) offered a physical interpretation of von Mises criterion suggesting that yielding begins when the elastic energy of distortion reaches a critical value. For this reason, the von Mises criterion is also known as the maximum distortion strain energy criterion. This comes from the relation between $J_2$ and the elastic strain energy of distortion $W_\text{D}$:

$W_\text{D} = \frac{J_2}{2G}\,\!$ with the elastic shear modulus $G = \frac{E}{2(1 + \nu)}\,\!$.

In 1937 Arpad L. Nadai suggested that yielding begins when the octahedral shear stress reaches a critical value, i.e. the octahedral shear stress of the material at yield in simple tension. In this case, the von Mises yield criterion is also known as the maximum octahedral shear stress criterion in view of the direct proportionality that exists between $J_2$ and the octahedral shear stress, $\tau_\text{oct}$, which by definition is

$$\tau_\text{oct} = \sqrt{\frac{2}{3}J_2}\,\!$$

thus we have

$$\tau_\text{oct} = \frac{\sqrt{2}}{3} \sigma_\text{y}\,\!$$
Strain energy density consists of two components - volumetric or dialational and distortional. Volumetric component is responsible for change in volume without any change in shape. Distortional component is responsible for shear deformation or change in shape.

== Practical engineering usage of the von Mises yield criterion ==
As shown in the equations above, the use of the von Mises criterion as a yield criterion is only exactly applicable when the following material properties are isotropic, and the ratio of the shear yield strength to the tensile yield strength has the following value:

$$\frac{F_{sy}}{F_{ty}} = \frac{1}{\sqrt 3} \approx 0.577\!$$

Since no material will have this ratio precisely, in practice it is necessary to use engineering judgement to decide what failure theory is appropriate for a given material. Alternately, for use of the Tresca theory, the same ratio is defined as 1/2.

The yield margin of safety is written as

$$MS_\text{yld} = \frac{F_y}{\sigma_\text{v}} - 1$$

== See also ==
- Yield surface
- Huber's equation
- Henri Tresca
- Stephen Timoshenko
- Mohr–Coulomb theory
- Hoek–Brown failure criterion
- Yield (engineering)
- Stress
- Strain
- 3-D elasticity
- Bigoni–Piccolroaz yield criterion
