= Willam–Warnke yield criterion =

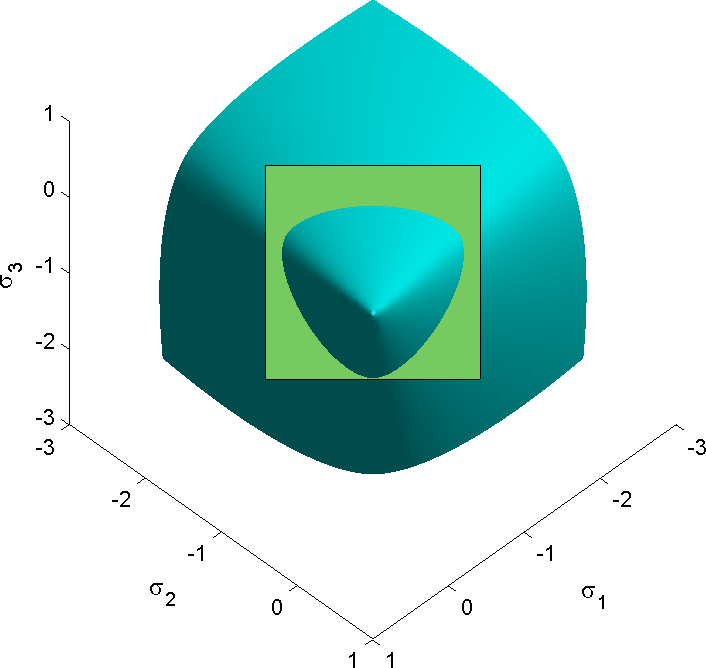
Three-parameter Willam-Warnke yield surface.

The Willam–Warnke yield criterion is a function that is used to predict when failure will occur in concrete and other cohesive-frictional materials such as rock, soil, and ceramics. This yield criterion has the functional form

$$f(I_1, J_2, J_3) = 0 \,$$

where $I_1$ is the first invariant of the Cauchy stress tensor, and $J_2, J_3$ are the second and third invariants of the deviatoric part of the Cauchy stress tensor. There are three material parameters ($\sigma_c$ - the uniaxial compressive strength, $\sigma_t$ – the uniaxial tensile strength, $\sigma_b$ - the equibiaxial compressive strength) that have to be determined before the Willam-Warnke yield criterion may be applied to predict failure.

In terms of $I_1, J_2, J_3$, the Willam-Warnke yield criterion can be expressed as

$$f := \sqrt{J_2} + \lambda(J_2,J_3)~(\tfrac{I_1}{3} - B) = 0$$

where $\lambda$ is a function that depends on $J_2,J_3$ and the three material parameters and $B$ depends only on the material parameters. The function $\lambda$ can be interpreted as the friction angle which depends on the Lode angle ($\theta$). The quantity $B$ is interpreted as a cohesion pressure. The Willam-Warnke yield criterion may therefore be viewed as a combination of the Mohr–Coulomb and the Drucker–Prager yield criteria.

== Willam-Warnke yield function ==
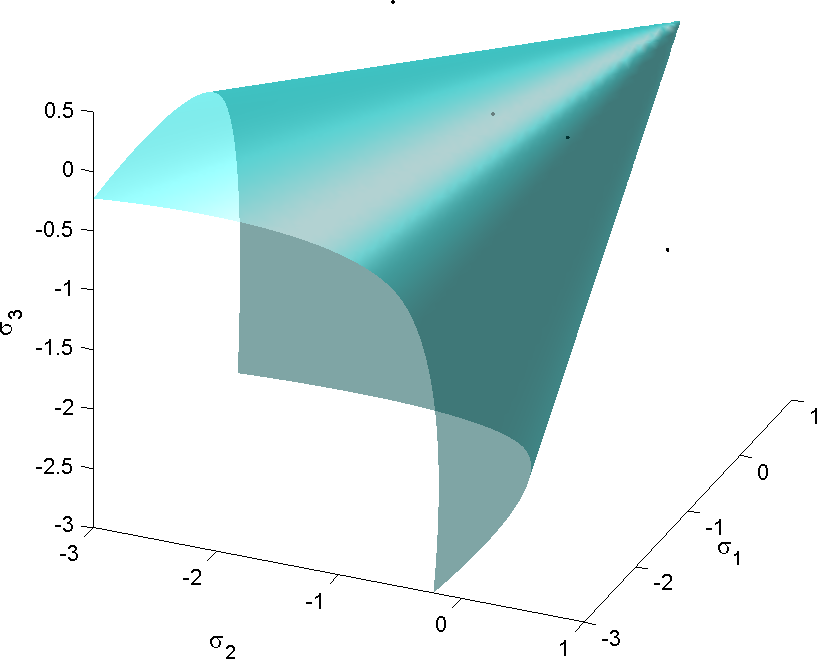
View of three-parameter Willam-Warnke yield surface in 3D space of principal stresses for $\sigma_c=1, \sigma_t=0.3, \sigma_b=1.7$

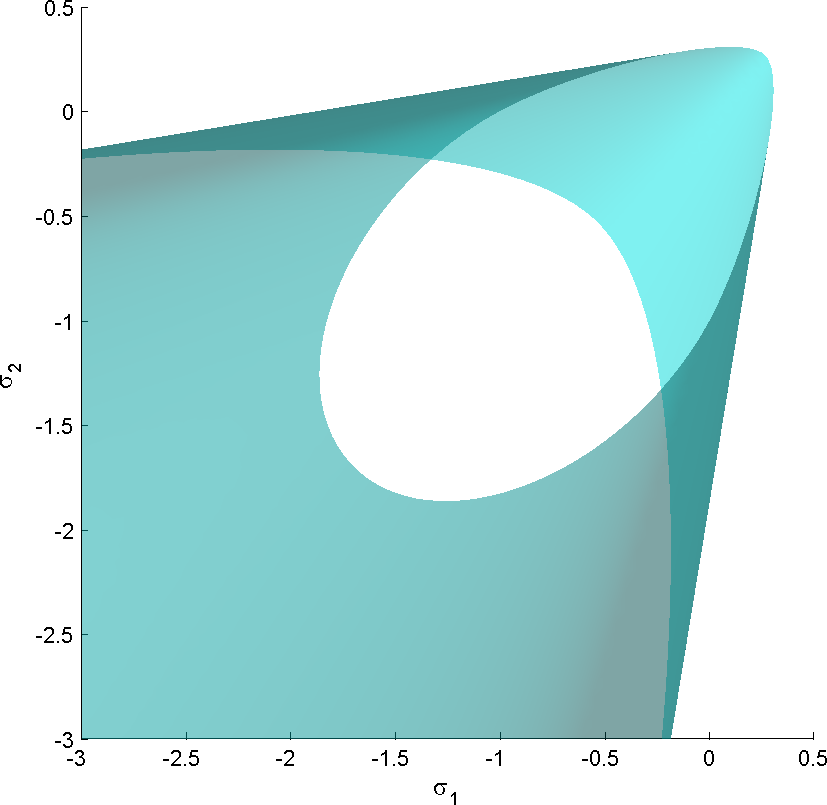
Trace of the three-parameter Willam-Warnke yield surface in the $\sigma_1-\sigma_2$-plane for $\sigma_c=1, \sigma_t=0.3, \sigma_b=1.7$

In the original paper, the three-parameter Willam-Warnke yield function was expressed as

$$f = \cfrac{1}{3z}~\cfrac{I_1}{\sigma_c} + \sqrt{\cfrac{2}{5}}~\cfrac{1}{r(\theta)}\cfrac{\sqrt{J_2}}{\sigma_c} - 1 \le 0$$

where $I_1$ is the first invariant of the stress tensor, $J_2$ is the second invariant of the deviatoric part of the stress tensor, $\sigma_c$ is the yield stress in uniaxial compression, and $\theta$ is the Lode angle given by

$$\theta = \tfrac{1}{3}\cos^{-1}\left(\cfrac{3\sqrt{3}}{2}~\cfrac{J_3}{J_2^{3/2}}\right) ~.$$

The locus of the boundary of the stress surface in the deviatoric stress plane is expressed in polar coordinates by the quantity $r(\theta)$ which is given by

$$r(\theta) := \cfrac{u(\theta)+v(\theta)}{w(\theta)}$$

where

$$\begin{align}
u(\theta) := & 2~r_c~(r_c^2-r_t^2)~\cos\theta \\
v(\theta) := & r_c~(2~r_t - r_c)\sqrt{4~(r_c^2 - r_t^2)~\cos^2\theta + 5~r_t^2 - 4~r_t~r_c} \\
w(\theta) := & 4(r_c^2 - r_t^2)\cos^2\theta + (r_c-2~r_t)^2
\end{align}$$

The quantities $r_t$ and $r_c$ describe the position vectors at the locations $\theta=0^\circ, 60^\circ$ and can be expressed in terms of $\sigma_c, \sigma_b, \sigma_t$ as (here $\sigma_b$ is the failure stress under equi-biaxial compression and $\sigma_t$ is the failure stress under uniaxial tension)

$$r_c :=  \sqrt{\cfrac{6}{5}}\left[\cfrac{\sigma_b\sigma_t}{3\sigma_b\sigma_t + \sigma_c(\sigma_b - \sigma_t)}\right] ~;~~
r_t :=  \sqrt{\cfrac{6}{5}}\left[\cfrac{\sigma_b\sigma_t}{\sigma_c(2\sigma_b+\sigma_t)}\right]$$

The parameter $z$ in the model is given by

$$z :=  \cfrac{\sigma_b\sigma_t}{\sigma_c(\sigma_b-\sigma_t)} ~.$$

The Haigh-Westergaard representation of the Willam-Warnke yield condition can be written as

$$f(\xi, \rho, \theta) = 0 \, \quad \equiv \quad
f := \bar{\lambda}(\theta)~\rho + \bar{B}~\xi - \sigma_c \le 0$$

where

$$\bar{B} := \cfrac{1}{\sqrt{3}~z} ~;~~ \bar{\lambda} := \cfrac{1}{\sqrt{5}~r(\theta)} ~.$$

== Modified forms of the Willam-Warnke yield criterion ==
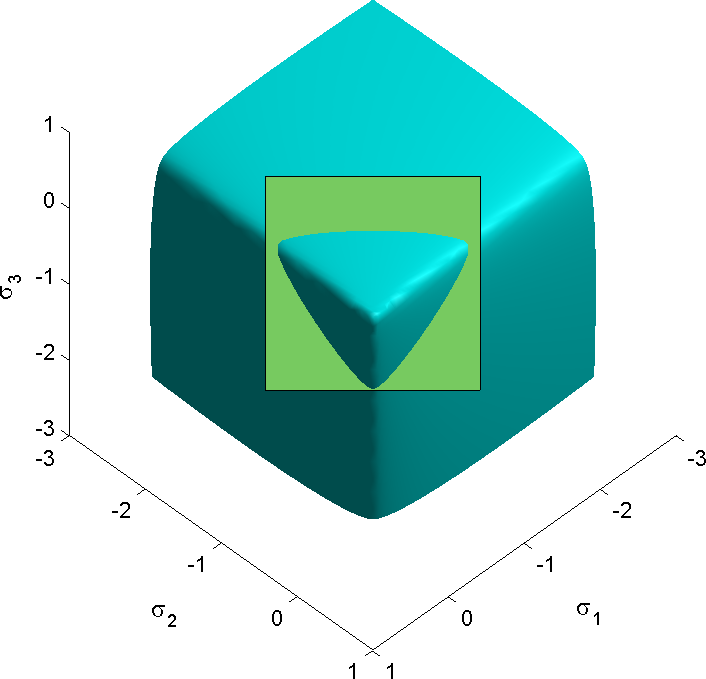
Ulm-Coussy-Bazant version of the three-parameter Willam-Warnke yield surface in the $\pi$-plane for $\sigma_c=1, \sigma_t=0.3, \sigma_b=1.7$

An alternative form of the Willam-Warnke yield criterion in Haigh-Westergaard coordinates is the Ulm-Coussy-Bazant form:

$$f(\xi, \rho, \theta) = 0 \, \quad \text{or} \quad
f := \rho + \bar{\lambda}(\theta)~\left(\xi - \bar{B}\right) = 0$$

where

$$\bar{\lambda} :=  \sqrt{\tfrac{2}{3}}~\cfrac{u(\theta)+v(\theta)}{w(\theta)} ~;~~
\bar{B} :=  \tfrac{1}{\sqrt{3}}~\left[\cfrac{\sigma_b\sigma_t}{\sigma_b-\sigma_t}\right]$$

and

$$\begin{align}
r_t := & \cfrac{\sqrt{3}~(\sigma_b-\sigma_t)}{2\sigma_b-\sigma_t} \\
r_c := & \cfrac{\sqrt{3}~\sigma_c~(\sigma_b-\sigma_t)}{(\sigma_c+\sigma_t)\sigma_b-\sigma_c\sigma_t}
\end{align}$$

The quantities $r_c, r_t$ are interpreted as friction coefficients. For the yield surface to be convex, the Willam-Warnke yield criterion requires that $2~r_t \ge r_c \ge r_t/2$ and $0 \le \theta \le \cfrac{\pi}{3}$.

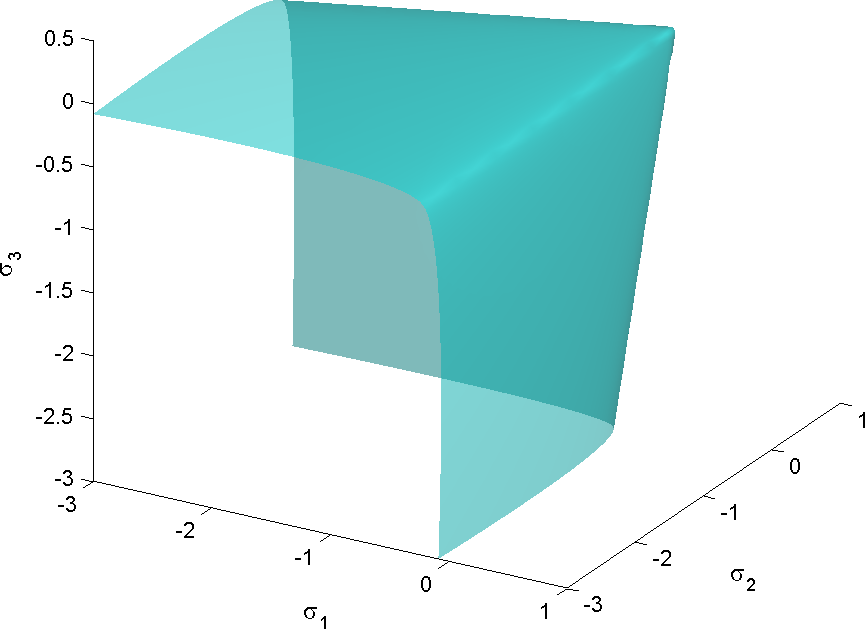
View of Ulm-Coussy-Bazant version of the three-parameter Willam-Warnke yield surface in 3D space of principal stresses for $\sigma_c=1, \sigma_t=0.3, \sigma_b=1.7$

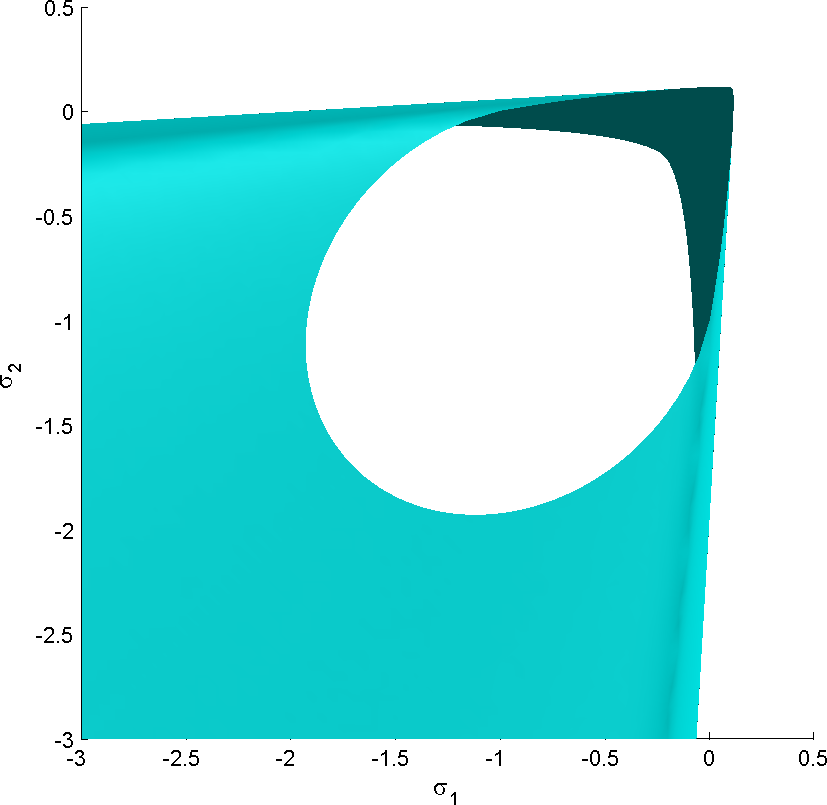
Trace of the Ulm-Coussy-Bazant version of the three-parameter Willam-Warnke yield surface in the $\sigma_1-\sigma_2$-plane for $\sigma_c=1, \sigma_t=0.3, \sigma_b=1.7$

== See also ==
- Yield (engineering)
- Yield surface
- Plasticity (physics)
