= Ratcheting =

Behavior in continuum mechanics

In continuum mechanics, ratcheting, or ratchetting, also known as cyclic creep, is a behavior in which plastic deformation accumulates due to cyclic mechanical or thermal stress.

In an article written by J. Bree in 1967, the phenomenon of ratcheting is described as "Unsymmetric cycles of stress between prescribed limits will cause progressive 'creep' or 'ratchet(t)ing' in the direction of the mean stress". Ratcheting is a progressive, incremental inelastic deformation characterized by a shift of the stress-strain hysteresis loop along the strain axis. When the amplitude of cyclic stresses exceed the elastic limit, the plastic deformation that occurs keep accumulating paving way for a catastrophic failure of the structure. Nonlinear kinematic hardening, which occurs when the stress state reaches the yield surface, is considered as the main mechanism behind ratcheting. Several factors influences the extent of ratcheting including the load condition, mean stress, stress amplitude, stress ratio, load history, plastic slip, dislocation movement, and cells deformations.

The effect of structural ratcheting can sometimes be represented in terms of the Bree diagram. Alternative material models have been proposed to simulate ratcheting, such as Chaboche, Ohno-Wang, Armstrong–Frederick, etc.

Ratcheting is a significant effect to be considered to check permanent deformation in systems which undergoes a cyclic loading. Common examples of such repetitive stresses include sea waves, road traffic, and earthquakes. Initially it was studied to inspect the permanent deformation of thin, nuclear fuel cans with an internal pressure and temperature gradient while undergoing repetitive non-zero mean stresses.
