= Mohr–Coulomb theory =

Mathematical model in materials science

Mohr–Coulomb theory is a mathematical model (see yield surface) describing the response of brittle materials such as concrete, or rubble piles, to shear stress as well as normal stress. Most of the classical engineering materials follow this rule in at least a portion of their shear failure envelope. Generally the theory applies to materials for which the compressive strength far exceeds the tensile strength.

In geotechnical engineering it is used to define shear strength of soils and rocks at different effective stresses.

In structural engineering it is used to determine failure load as well as the angle of fracture of a displacement fracture in concrete and similar materials. Coulomb's friction hypothesis is used to determine the combination of shear and normal stress that will cause a fracture of the material. Mohr's circle is used to determine which principal stresses will produce this combination of shear and normal stress, and the angle of the plane in which this will occur. According to the principle of normality the stress introduced at failure will be perpendicular to the line describing the fracture condition.

It can be shown that a material failing according to Coulomb's friction hypothesis will show the displacement introduced at failure forming an angle to the line of fracture equal to the angle of friction. This makes the strength of the material determinable by comparing the external mechanical work introduced by the displacement and the external load with the internal mechanical work introduced by the strain and stress at the line of failure. By conservation of energy the sum of these must be zero and this will make it possible to calculate the failure load of the construction.

A common improvement of this model is to combine Coulomb's friction hypothesis with Rankine's principal stress hypothesis to describe a separation fracture. An alternative view derives the Mohr-Coulomb criterion as extension failure.

== History of the development ==
The Mohr–Coulomb theory is named in honour of Charles-Augustin de Coulomb and Christian Otto Mohr. Coulomb's contribution was a 1776 essay entitled "Essai sur une application des règles des maximis et minimis à quelques problèmes de statique relatifs à l'architecture" . Mohr developed a generalised form of the theory around the end of the 19th century. As the generalised form affected the interpretation of the criterion, but not the substance of it, some texts continue to refer to the criterion as simply the 'Coulomb criterion'.

== Mohr–Coulomb failure criterion ==
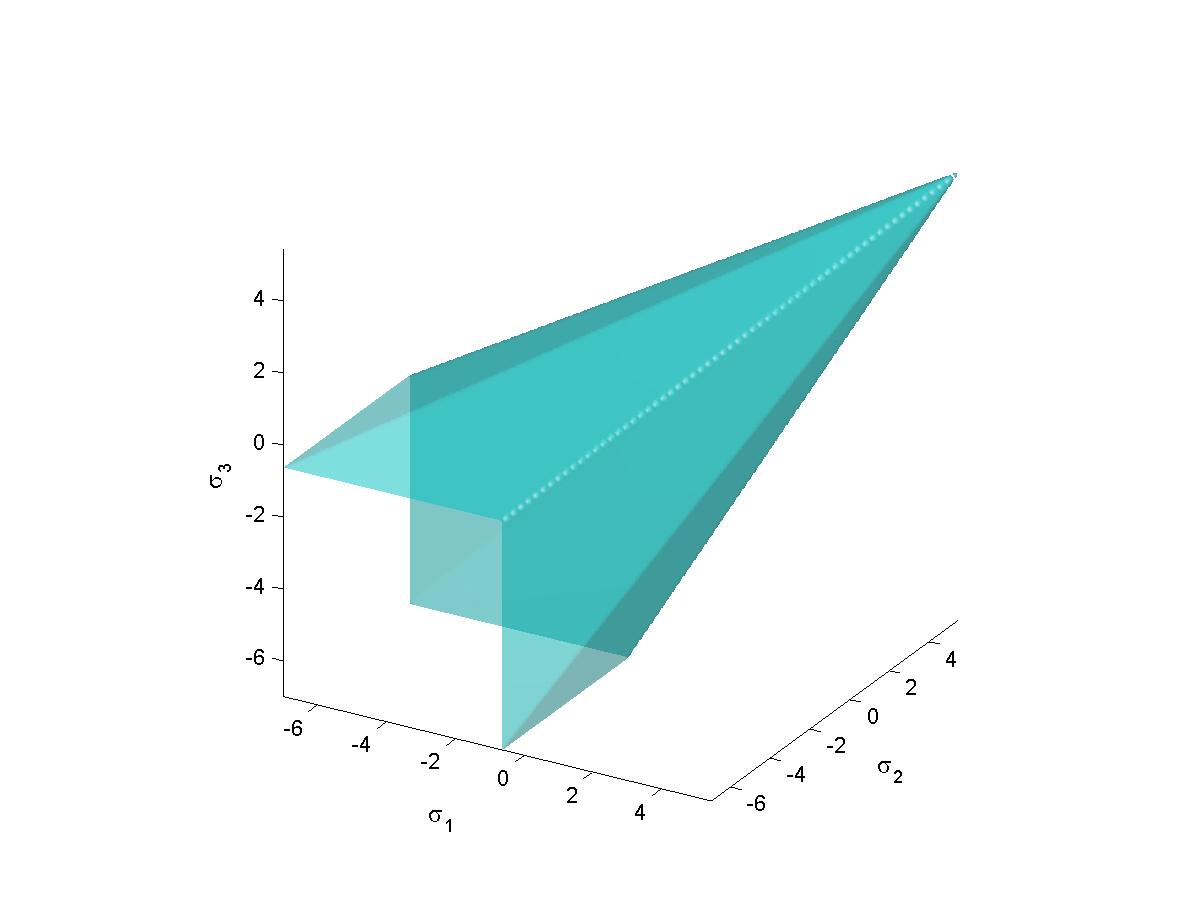
Figure 1: View of Mohr–Coulomb failure surface in 3D space of principal stresses for $c=2, \phi=-20^\circ$

The Mohr–Coulomb failure criterion represents the linear envelope that is obtained from a plot of the shear strength of a material versus the applied normal stress. This relation is expressed as

$$\tau = \sigma~\tan(\phi) + c$$

where $\tau$ is the shear strength, $\sigma$ is the normal stress, $c$ is the intercept of the failure envelope with the $\tau$ axis, and $\tan(\phi)$ is the slope of the failure envelope. The quantity $c$ is often called the cohesion and the angle $\phi$ is called the angle of internal friction. Compression is assumed to be positive in the following discussion. If compression is assumed to be negative then $\sigma$ should be replaced with $-\sigma$.

If $\phi = 0$, the Mohr–Coulomb criterion reduces to the Tresca criterion. On the other hand, if $\phi = 90^\circ$ the Mohr–Coulomb model is equivalent to the Rankine model. Higher values of $\phi$ are not allowed.

From Mohr's circle we have
$$\sigma = \sigma_m - \tau_m \sin\phi ~;~~ \tau = \tau_m \cos\phi$$
where
$$\tau_m = \cfrac{\sigma_1-\sigma_3}{2} ~;~~  \sigma_m = \cfrac{\sigma_1+\sigma_3}{2}$$
and $\sigma_1$ is the maximum principal stress and $\sigma_3$ is the minimum principal stress.

Therefore, the Mohr–Coulomb criterion may also be expressed as
$$\tau_m = \sigma_m \sin\phi + c \cos\phi ~.$$

This form of the Mohr–Coulomb criterion is applicable to failure on a plane that is parallel to the $\sigma_2$ direction.

=== Mohr–Coulomb failure criterion in three dimensions ===
The Mohr–Coulomb criterion in three dimensions is often expressed as

$$\left\{\begin{align}
\pm\cfrac{\sigma_1 - \sigma_2}{2} & = \left[\cfrac{\sigma_1 + \sigma_2}{2}\right]\sin(\phi) + c\cos(\phi) \\
\pm\cfrac{\sigma_2 - \sigma_3}{2} & = \left[\cfrac{\sigma_2 + \sigma_3}{2}\right]\sin(\phi) + c\cos(\phi)\\
\pm\cfrac{\sigma_3 - \sigma_1}{2} & = \left[\cfrac{\sigma_3 + \sigma_1}{2}\right]\sin(\phi) + c\cos(\phi).
\end{align}\right.$$

The Mohr–Coulomb failure surface is a cone with a hexagonal cross section in deviatoric stress space.

The expressions for $\tau$ and $\sigma$ can be generalized to three dimensions by developing expressions for the normal stress and the resolved shear stress on a plane of arbitrary orientation with respect to the coordinate axes (basis vectors). If the unit normal to the plane of interest is

$$\mathbf{n} = n_1~\mathbf{e}_1 + n_2~\mathbf{e}_2 + n_3~\mathbf{e}_3$$

where $\mathbf{e}_i,~~ i=1,2,3$ are three orthonormal unit basis vectors, and if the principal stresses $\sigma_1, \sigma_2, \sigma_3$ are aligned with the basis vectors $\mathbf{e}_1, \mathbf{e}_2, \mathbf{e}_3$, then the expressions for $\sigma,\tau$ are

$$\begin{align}
\sigma & = n_1^2 \sigma_{1} + n_2^2 \sigma_{2} + n_3^2 \sigma_{3} \\
\tau & = \sqrt{(n_1\sigma_{1})^2 + (n_2\sigma_{2})^2 + (n_3\sigma_{3})^2 - \sigma^2} \\
& = \sqrt{n_1^2 n_2^2 (\sigma_1-\sigma_2)^2 + n_2^2 n_3^2 (\sigma_2-\sigma_3)^2 +
n_3^2 n_1^2 (\sigma_3 - \sigma_1)^2}.
\end{align}$$

The Mohr–Coulomb failure criterion can then be evaluated using the usual expression
$$\tau = \sigma~\tan(\phi) + c$$
for the six planes of maximum shear stress.

Derivation of normal and shear stress on a plane
Let the unit normal to the plane of interest be

$$\mathbf{n} = n_1~\mathbf{e}_1 + n_2~\mathbf{e}_2 + n_3~\mathbf{e}_3$$

where $\mathbf{e}_i,~~ i=1,2,3$ are three orthonormal unit basis vectors. Then the traction vector on the plane is given by

$$\mathbf{t} = n_i~\sigma_{ij}~\mathbf{e}_j   ~~~\text{(repeated indices indicate summation)}$$

The magnitude of the traction vector is given by

$$|\mathbf{t}| = \sqrt{ (n_j~\sigma_{1j})^2 + (n_k~\sigma_{2k})^2 + (n_l~\sigma_{3l})^2}  ~~~\text{(repeated indices indicate summation)}$$

Then the magnitude of the stress normal to the plane is given by

$$\sigma = \mathbf{t}\cdot\mathbf{n} = n_i~\sigma_{ij}~n_j ~~\text{(repeated indices indicate summation)}$$

The magnitude of the resolved shear stress on the plane is given by
$$\tau = \sqrt{|\mathbf{t}|^2 - \sigma^2}$$
In terms of components, we have

$$\begin{align}
\sigma & = n_1^2 \sigma_{11} + n_2^2 \sigma_{22} + n_3^2 \sigma_{33} +
2(n_1 n_2 \sigma_{12} + n_2 n_3 \sigma_{23} + n_3 n_1 \sigma_{31}) \\
\tau & = \sqrt{(n_1\sigma_{11} + n_2\sigma_{12} + n_3\sigma_{31})^2 +
(n_1\sigma_{12} + n_2\sigma_{22} + n_3\sigma_{23})^2 +
(n_1\sigma_{31} + n_2\sigma_{23} + n_3\sigma_{33})^2 - \sigma^2}
\end{align}$$

If the principal stresses $\sigma_1, \sigma_2, \sigma_3$ are aligned with the basis vectors $\mathbf{e}_1, \mathbf{e}_2, \mathbf{e}_3$, then the expressions for $\sigma,\tau$ are

$$\begin{align}
\sigma & = n_1^2 \sigma_{1} + n_2^2 \sigma_{2} + n_3^2 \sigma_{3} \\
\tau & = \sqrt{(n_1\sigma_{1})^2 + (n_2\sigma_{2})^2 + (n_3\sigma_{3})^2 - \sigma^2} \\
& = \sqrt{n_1^2 n_2^2 (\sigma_1-\sigma_2)^2 + n_2^2 n_3^2 (\sigma_2-\sigma_3)^2 +
n_3^2 n_1^2 (\sigma_3 - \sigma_1)^2}
\end{align}$$

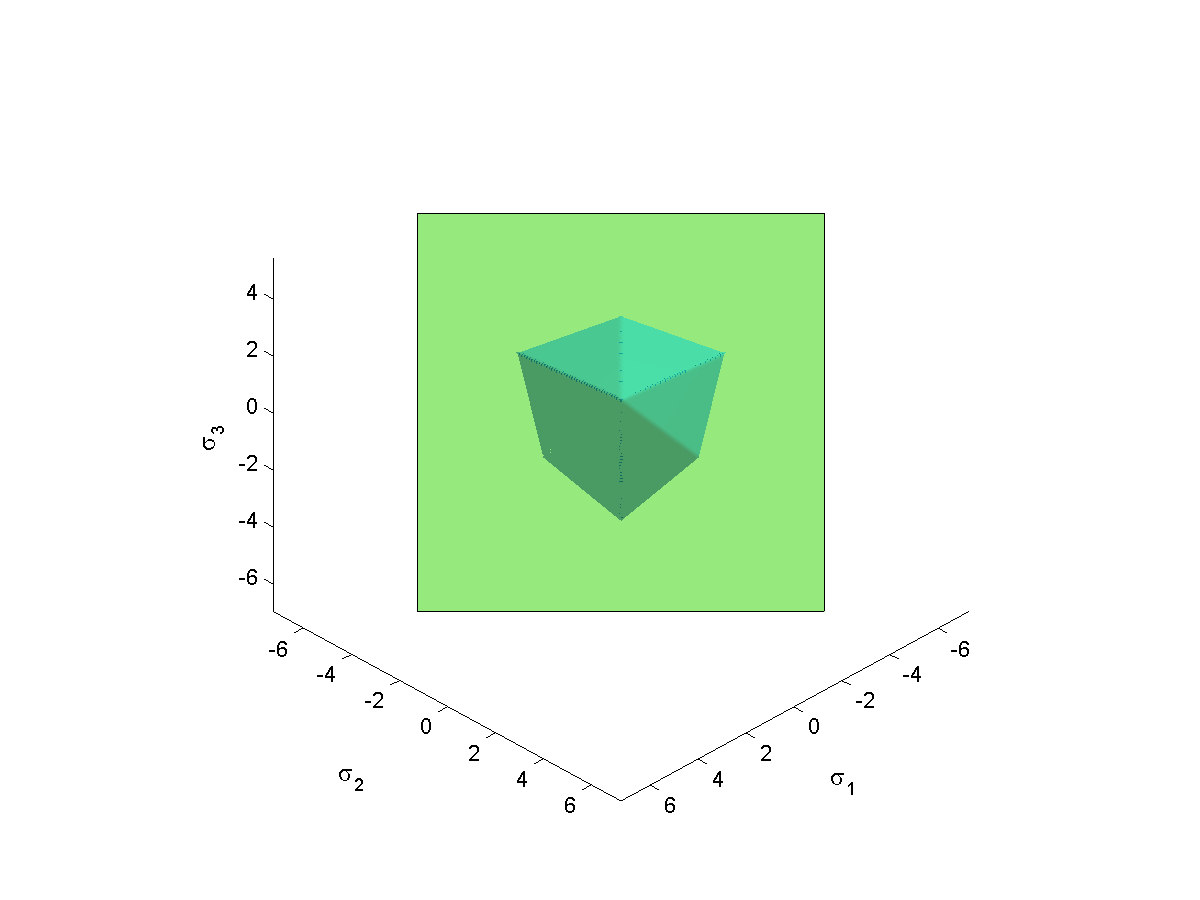
Figure 2: Mohr–Coulomb yield surface in the $\pi$-plane for $c = 2, \phi = 20^\circ$

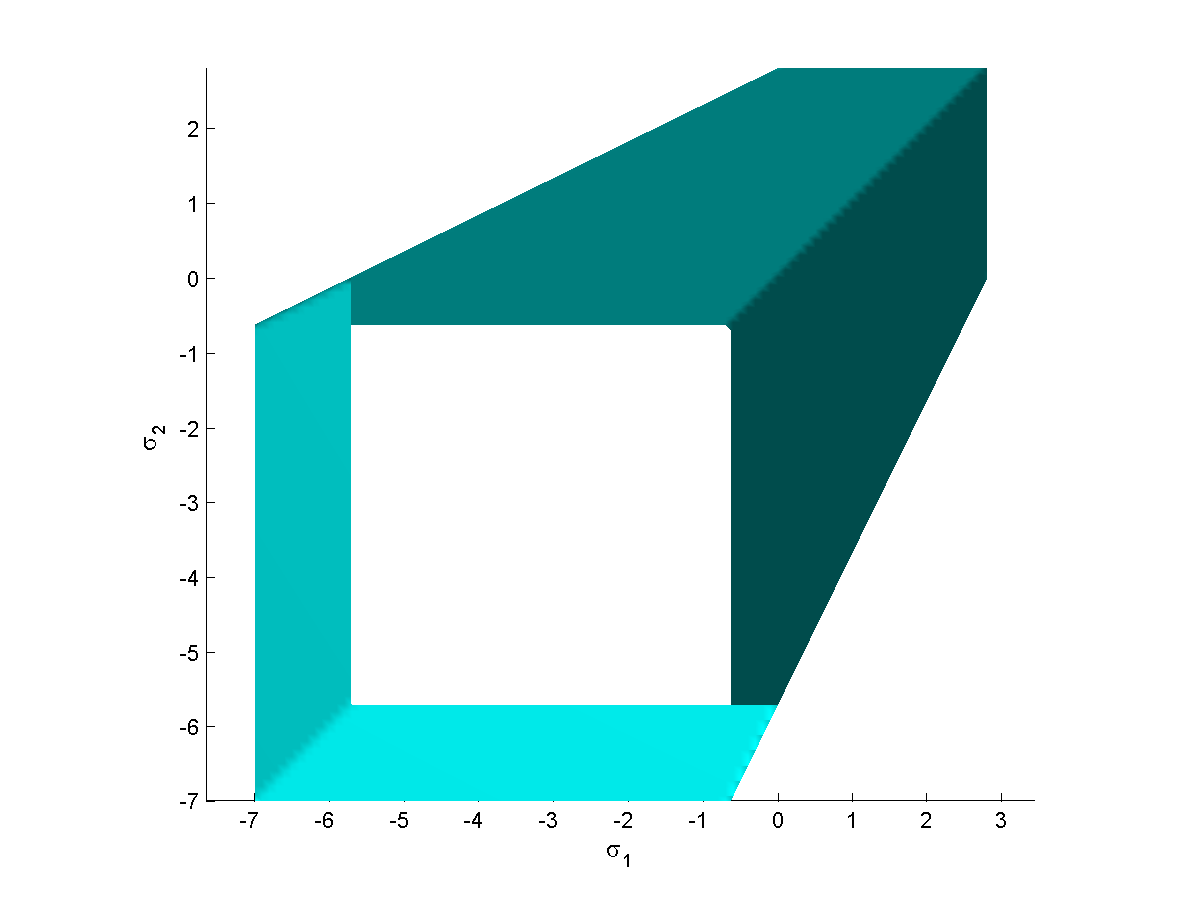
Figure 3: Trace of the Mohr–Coulomb yield surface in the $\sigma_1-\sigma_2$-plane for $c = 2, \phi = 20^\circ$

== Mohr–Coulomb failure surface in Haigh–Westergaard space ==
The Mohr–Coulomb failure (yield) surface is often expressed in Haigh–Westergaad coordinates. For example, the function
$$\cfrac{\sigma_1-\sigma_3}{2} = \cfrac{\sigma_1+\sigma_3}{2}~\sin\phi + c\cos\phi$$
can be expressed as

$$\left[\sqrt{3}~\sin\left(\theta+\cfrac{\pi}{3}\right) + \sin\phi\cos\left(\theta+\cfrac{\pi}{3}\right)\right]\rho - \sqrt{2}\sin(\phi)\xi = \sqrt{6} c \cos\phi.$$

Alternatively, in terms of the invariants $p, q, r$ we can write

$$\left[\cfrac{1}{\sqrt{3}~\cos\phi}~\sin\left(\theta+\cfrac{\pi}{3}\right) + \cfrac{1}{3}\tan\phi~\cos\left(\theta+\cfrac{\pi}{3}\right)\right]q - p~\tan\phi = c$$

where
$$\theta = \cfrac{1}{3}\arccos\left[\left(\cfrac{r}{q}\right)^3\right] ~.$$

Derivation of alternative forms of Mohr–Coulomb yield function
We can express the yield function

$$\cfrac{\sigma_1-\sigma_3}{2} = \cfrac{\sigma_1+\sigma_3}{2}~\sin\phi + c\cos\phi$$
as

$$\sigma_1~\cfrac{(1-\sin\phi)}{2~c~\cos\phi} - \sigma_3~\cfrac{(1+\sin\phi)}{2~c~\cos\phi} = 1 ~.$$

The Haigh–Westergaard invariants are related to the principal stresses by

$$\sigma_1 = \cfrac{1}{\sqrt{3}}~\xi + \sqrt{\cfrac{2}{3}}~\rho~\cos\theta ~;~~
\sigma_3 = \cfrac{1}{\sqrt{3}}~\xi + \sqrt{\cfrac{2}{3}}~\rho~\cos\left(\theta+\cfrac{2\pi}{3}\right) ~.$$

Plugging into the expression for the Mohr–Coulomb yield function gives us

$$-\sqrt{2}~\xi~\sin\phi + \rho[\cos\theta - \cos(\theta+2\pi/3)] - \rho\sin\phi[\cos\theta+\cos(\theta+2\pi/3)] = \sqrt{6}~c~\cos\phi$$

Using trigonometric identities for the sum and difference of cosines and rearrangement gives us the expression of the Mohr–Coulomb yield function in terms of $\xi, \rho, \theta$.

We can express the yield function in terms of $p,q$ by using the relations
$$\xi = \sqrt{3}~p ~;~~ \rho = \sqrt{\cfrac{2}{3}}~q$$
and straightforward substitution.

== Mohr–Coulomb yield and plasticity ==
The Mohr–Coulomb yield surface is often used to model the plastic flow of geomaterials (and other cohesive-frictional materials). Many such materials show dilatational behavior under triaxial states of stress which the Mohr–Coulomb model does not include. Also, since the yield surface has corners, it may be inconvenient to use the original Mohr–Coulomb model to determine the direction of plastic flow (in the flow theory of plasticity).

A common approach is to use a non-associated plastic flow potential that is smooth. An example of such a potential is the function
$$g:= \sqrt{(\alpha c_\mathrm{y} \tan\psi)^2 + G^2(\phi, \theta)~ q^2} - p \tan\phi$$

where $\alpha$ is a parameter, $c_\mathrm{y}$ is the value of $c$ when the plastic strain is zero (also called the initial cohesion yield stress), $\psi$ is the angle made by the yield surface in the Rendulic plane at high values of $p$ (this angle is also called the dilation angle), and $G(\phi,\theta)$ is an appropriate function that is also smooth in the deviatoric stress plane.

== Typical values of cohesion and angle of internal friction ==
Cohesion (alternatively called the cohesive strength) and friction angle values for rocks and some common soils are listed in the tables below.

Cohesive strength (c) for some materials
Material	Cohesive strength in kPa	Cohesive strength in psi
Rock	10000	1450
Silt	75	10
Clay	10 to 200	1.5 to 30
Very soft clay	0 to 48	0 to 7
Soft clay	48 to 96	7 to 14
Medium clay	96 to 192	14 to 28
Stiff clay	192 to 384	28 to 56
Very stiff clay	384 to 766	28 to 110
Hard clay	> 766	> 110

Angle of internal friction ($\phi$) for some materials
Material	Friction angle in degrees
Rock	30°
Sand	30° to 45°
Gravel	35°
Silt	26° to 35°
Clay	20°
Loose sand	30° to 35°
Medium sand	40°
Dense sand	35° to 45°
Sandy gravel	> 34° to 48°

== See also ==
- 3-D elasticity
- Hoek–Brown failure criterion
- Byerlee's law
- Lateral earth pressure
- von Mises stress
- Yield (engineering)
- Drucker Prager yield criterion — a smooth version of the M–C yield criterion
- Lode coordinates
- Bigoni–Piccolroaz yield criterion
