= Principle of normality =

The Principle of normality in solid mechanics states that if a normal to the yield locus is constructed at the point of yielding, the strains that result from yielding are in the same ratio as the stress components of the normal.
