= Yield surface =

Geometric representation of material yield

Surfaces on which the invariants $I_1$, $J_2$, $J_3$ are constant. Plotted in principal stress space.

A yield surface is a five-dimensional surface in the six-dimensional space of stresses. The yield surface is usually convex and the state of stress of inside the yield surface is elastic. When the stress state lies on the surface the material is said to have reached its yield point and the material is said to have become plastic. Further deformation of the material causes the stress state to remain on the yield surface, even though the shape and size of the surface may change as the plastic deformation evolves. This is because stress states that lie outside the yield surface are non-permissible in rate-independent plasticity, though not in some models of viscoplasticity.

The yield surface is usually expressed in terms of (and visualized in) a three-dimensional principal stress space ($\sigma_1, \sigma_2 , \sigma_3$), a two- or three-dimensional space spanned by stress invariants ($I_1, J_2, J_3$) or a version of the three-dimensional Haigh–Westergaard stress space. Thus we may write the equation of the yield surface (that is, the yield function) in the forms:

- $f(\sigma_1,\sigma_2,\sigma_3) = 0 \,$ where $\sigma_i$ are the principal stresses.
- $f(I_1, J_2, J_3) = 0 \,$ where $I_1$ is the first principal invariant of the Cauchy stress and $J_2, J_3$ are the second and third principal invariants of the deviatoric part of the Cauchy stress.
- $f(p, q, r) = 0 \,$ where $p, q$ are scaled versions of $I_1$ and $J_2$ and $r$ is a function of $J_2, J_3$.
- $f(\xi,\rho,\theta) = 0 \,$ where $\xi,\rho$ are scaled versions of $I_1$ and $J_2$, and $\theta$ is the stress angle or Lode angle

== Invariants used to describe yield surfaces ==
Surfaces on which the invariants $\xi$, $\rho$, $\theta$ are constant. Plotted in principal stress space.

The first principal invariant ($I_1$) of the Cauchy stress ($\boldsymbol{\sigma}$), and the second and third principal invariants ($J_2, J_3$) of the deviatoric part ($\boldsymbol{s}$) of the Cauchy stress are defined as:

$$\begin{align}
I_1 & = \text{Tr}(\boldsymbol{\sigma}) = \sigma_1 + \sigma_2 + \sigma_3 \\
J_2 & = \tfrac{1}{2} \boldsymbol{s}:\boldsymbol{s} =
\tfrac{1}{6}\left[(\sigma_1-\sigma_2)^2+(\sigma_2-\sigma_3)^2+(\sigma_3-\sigma_1)^2\right] \\
J_3 & = \det(\boldsymbol{s}) = \tfrac{1}{3} (\boldsymbol{s}\cdot\boldsymbol{s}):\boldsymbol{s}
= s_1 s_2 s_3
\end{align}$$

where ($\sigma_1, \sigma_2 , \sigma_3$) are the principal values of $\boldsymbol{\sigma}$, ($s_1, s_2, s_3$) are the principal values of $\boldsymbol{s}$, and

$$\boldsymbol{s} = \boldsymbol{\sigma}-\tfrac{I_1}{3}\,\boldsymbol{I}$$

where $\boldsymbol{I}$ is the identity matrix.

A related set of quantities, ($p, q, r\,$), are usually used to describe yield surfaces for cohesive frictional materials such as rocks, soils, and ceramics. These are defined as

$$p = \tfrac{1}{3}~I_1 ~:~~
q = \sqrt{3~J_2} = \sigma_\mathrm{eq} ~;~~
r = 3\left(\tfrac{1}{2}\,J_3\right)^{1/3}$$

where $\sigma_\mathrm{eq}$ is the equivalent stress. However, the possibility of negative values of $J_3$ and the resulting imaginary $r$ makes the use of these quantities problematic in practice.

Another related set of widely used invariants is ($\xi, \rho, \theta\,$) which describe a cylindrical coordinate system (the Haigh–Westergaard coordinates). These are defined as:

$$\xi  = \tfrac{1}{\sqrt{3}}~I_1 = \sqrt{3}~p ~;~~
\rho  = \sqrt{2 J_2} = \sqrt{\tfrac{2}{3}}~q ~;~~
\cos(3\theta)  = \left(\tfrac{r}{q}\right)^3 = \tfrac{3\sqrt{3}}{2}~\cfrac{J_3}{J_2^{3/2}}$$

The $\xi-\rho\,$ plane is also called the Rendulic plane. The angle $\theta$ is called stress angle, the value $\cos(3\theta)$ is sometimes called the Lode parameter and the relation between $\theta$ and $J_2,J_3$ was first given by Novozhilov V.V. in 1951, see also

The principal stresses and the Haigh–Westergaard coordinates are related by

$$\begin{bmatrix} \sigma_1 \\ \sigma_2 \\ \sigma_3 \end{bmatrix} =
\tfrac{1}{\sqrt{3}} \begin{bmatrix} \xi \\ \xi \\ \xi \end{bmatrix} +
\sqrt{\tfrac{2}{3}}~\rho~\begin{bmatrix} \cos\theta \\ \cos\left(\theta-\tfrac{2\pi}{3}\right) \\ \cos\left(\theta+\tfrac{2\pi}{3}\right) \end{bmatrix}
= \tfrac{1}{\sqrt{3}} \begin{bmatrix} \xi \\ \xi \\ \xi \end{bmatrix} +
\sqrt{\tfrac{2}{3}}~\rho~\begin{bmatrix} \cos\theta \\ -\sin\left(\tfrac{\pi}{6}-\theta\right) \\ -\sin\left(\tfrac{\pi}{6}+\theta\right) \end{bmatrix} \,.$$

A different definition of the Lode angle can also be found in the literature:

$$\sin(3\theta) = ~\tfrac{3\sqrt{3}}{2}~\cfrac{J_3}{J_2^{3/2}}$$

in which case the ordered principal stresses (where $\sigma_1 \geq \sigma_2 \geq \sigma_3$) are related by

$$\begin{bmatrix} \sigma_1 \\ \sigma_2 \\ \sigma_3 \end{bmatrix} =
\tfrac{1}{\sqrt{3}} \begin{bmatrix} \xi \\ \xi \\ \xi \end{bmatrix}
+
\tfrac{\rho}{\sqrt{2}}~\begin{bmatrix} \cos\theta - \tfrac{\sin\theta}{\sqrt{3}}  \\ \tfrac{2\sin\theta}{\sqrt{3}} \\ -\tfrac{\sin\theta}{\sqrt{3}} - \cos\theta \end{bmatrix}
\,.$$

Note. It is incorrect (false) information that Chakrabarty did define shear stress mode angle with sin(3Teta). Chakrabarty adopted Lode parameter with opposite sign than it has in the original Lode paper from 1926, see Page 59, formula (3) in the book «Chakrabarty, Jagabanduhu; 2006, Theory of Plasticity: Third edition, Elsevier, Amsterdam.». Actually, Chakrabarty defined shear stress mode angle with -sin(3Teta) just like it did for the first time V.V. Novozhilov in his work from 1951, Novozhilov V.V., «O связи между напряжениями и деформациями в нелинейно упругой среде» (On relations between stresses and strains in non-linear elastic media), Прикладная математика и механика, 1951, p. 183-194; https://pmm.ipmnet.ru/ru/get/1951/15-2/183-194. The first work in which rational arguments and discussion is delivered why it is wise and useful to define shear stress mode angle with sin(.) function, regardless of the sign of the angle theta, is the Ziolkowski’s work «Parametrization of Cauchy Stress Tensor Treated as Autonomous Object Using Isotropy Angle and Skewness Angle» from 2022, https://et.ippt.pan.pl/index.php/et/article/view/2210, where it is elucidated that adopting definition of shear stress mode angle with sin(.) function physically means accepting pure shears as comparison reference states, and it is explained why it is very beneficial.

== Examples of yield surfaces ==
There are several different yield surfaces known in engineering, and those most popular are listed below.

=== Tresca yield surface ===
The Tresca yield criterion is taken to be the work of Henri Tresca. It is also known as the maximum shear stress theory (MSST) and the Tresca–Guest (TG) criterion. In terms of the principal stresses the Tresca criterion is expressed as

$$\tfrac{1}{2}{\max(|\sigma_1 - \sigma_2| , |\sigma_2 - \sigma_3| , |\sigma_3 - \sigma_1| ) = S_{sy} = \tfrac{1}{2}S_y}\!$$

Where $S_{sy}$ is the yield strength in shear, and $S_y$ is the tensile yield strength.

Figure 1 shows the Tresca–Guest yield surface in the three-dimensional space of principal stresses. It is a prism of six sides and having infinite length. This means that the material remains elastic when all three principal stresses are roughly equivalent (a hydrostatic pressure), no matter how much it is compressed or stretched. However, when one of the principal stresses becomes smaller (or larger) than the others the material is subject to shearing. In such situations, if the shear stress reaches the yield limit then the material enters the plastic domain. Figure 2 shows the Tresca–Guest yield surface in two-dimensional stress space, it is a cross section of the prism along the $\sigma_1, \sigma_2$ plane.

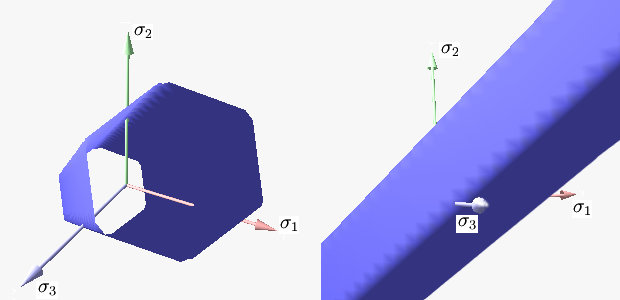
Figure 1: View of Tresca–Guest yield surface in 3D space of principal stresses

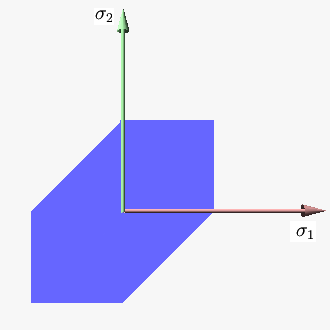
Figure 2: Tresca–Guest yield surface in 2D space ($\sigma_1, \sigma_2$)

=== von Mises yield surface ===
The von Mises yield criterion is expressed in the principal stresses as

$${(\sigma_1 - \sigma_2)^2 + (\sigma_2 - \sigma_3)^2 + (\sigma_3 - \sigma_1)^2 = 2 {S_y}^2 }\!$$

where $S_y$ is the yield strength in uniaxial tension.

Figure 3 shows the von Mises yield surface in the three-dimensional space of principal stresses. It is a circular cylinder of infinite length with its axis inclined at equal angles to the three principal stresses. Figure 4 shows the von Mises yield surface in two-dimensional space compared with Tresca–Guest criterion. A cross section of the von Mises cylinder on the plane of $\sigma_1, \sigma_2$ produces the elliptical shape of the yield surface.

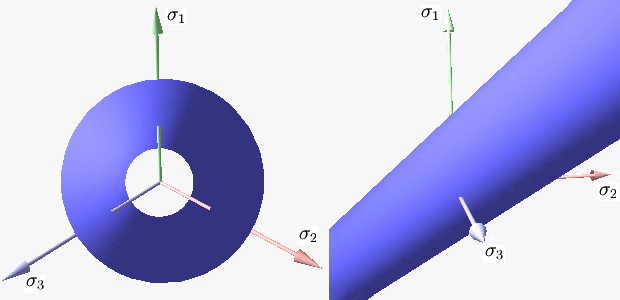
Figure 3: View of Huber–Mises–Hencky yield surface in 3D space of principal stresses

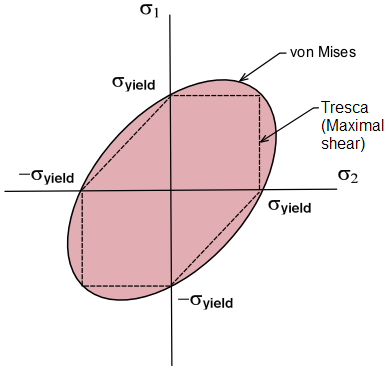
Figure 4: Comparison of Tresca–Guest and Huber–Mises–Hencky criteria in 2D space ($\sigma_1, \sigma_2$)

=== Burzyński-Yagn criterion ===
This criterion reformulated as the function of the hydrostatic nodes with the coordinates $1/\gamma_1$ and $1/\gamma_2$

$$3I_2' =
\frac{\sigma_\mathrm{eq}-\gamma_1I_1}{1-\gamma_1}
\frac{\sigma_\mathrm{eq}-\gamma_2I_1}{1-\gamma_2}$$

represents the general equation of a second order surface of revolution about the hydrostatic axis. Some special case are:

- cylinder $\gamma_1 = \gamma_2 = 0$ (Maxwell (1865), Huber (1904), von Mises (1913), Hencky (1924)),
- cone $\gamma_1 = \gamma_2 \in ]0,1[$ (Botkin (1940), Drucker-Prager (1952), Mirolyubov (1953)),
- paraboloid $\gamma_1 \in ]0,1[, \gamma_2 = 0$ (Burzyński (1928), Balandin (1937), Torre (1947)),
- ellipsoid centered of symmetry plane $I_1 = 0$, $\gamma_1 = - \gamma_2 \in ]0,1[$ (Beltrami (1885)),
- ellipsoid centered of symmetry plane $I_1 = \frac{1}{2}\,\bigg(\frac{1}{\gamma_1}+\frac{1}{\gamma_2} \bigg)$ with $\gamma_1 \in ]0,1[, \gamma_2<0$ (Schleicher (1926)),
- hyperboloid of two sheets $\gamma_1 \in ]0,1[, \gamma_2 \in ]0,\gamma_1[$ (Burzynski (1928), Yagn (1931)),
- hyperboloid of one sheet centered of symmetry plane $I_1 = 0$, $\gamma_1=-\gamma_2 =a\,i$, $i =\sqrt{-1}$ (Kuhn (1980))
- hyperboloid of one sheet $\gamma_{1,2}= b \pm a\,i$, $i =\sqrt{-1}$ (Filonenko-Boroditsch (1960), Gol’denblat-Kopnov (1968), Filin (1975)).

The relations compression-tension and torsion-tension can be computed to

$$\frac{\sigma_-}{\sigma_+} =\frac{1}{1-\gamma_1-\gamma_2}, \qquad \bigg(\sqrt{3}\,\frac{\tau_*}{\sigma_+}\bigg)^2 =   \frac{1}{(1-\gamma_1)(1-\gamma_2)}$$

The Poisson's ratios at tension and compression are obtained using

$$\nu_+^\mathrm{in} =
\frac{-1+2(\gamma_1+\gamma_2)-3\gamma_1\gamma_2}{-2+\gamma_1+\gamma_2}$$
$$\nu_-^\mathrm{in} = -     \frac{-1+
\gamma_1^2+\gamma_2^2-\gamma_1\,\gamma_2}
{(-2+\gamma_1+\gamma_2)\,(-1+\gamma_1+\gamma_2)}$$

For ductile materials the restriction

$$\nu_+^\mathrm{in}\in \bigg[\,0.48,\,\frac{1}{2}\,\bigg]$$

is important. The application of rotationally symmetric criteria for brittle failure with

$$\nu_+^\mathrm{in}\in ]-1,~\nu_+^\mathrm{el}\,]$$

has not been studied sufficiently.

The Burzyński-Yagn criterion is well suited for academic purposes. For practical applications, the third invariant of the deviator in the odd and even power should be introduced in the equation, e.g.:

$$3I_2' \frac{1+c_3 \cos 3\theta+c_6 \cos^2 3\theta}{1+c_3+
c_6} =
\frac{\sigma_\mathrm{eq}-\gamma_1I_1}{1-\gamma_1}
\frac{\sigma_\mathrm{eq}-\gamma_2I_1}{1-\gamma_2}$$

=== Huber criterion ===
The Huber criterion consists of the Beltrami ellipsoid and a scaled von Mises cylinder in the principal stress space, see also

$$3\,I_2' =
\left\{
\begin{array}{ll}
\displaystyle\frac{\sigma_\mathrm{eq}-\gamma_1 \,I_1}{1-\gamma_1} \, \frac{\sigma_\mathrm{eq}+\gamma_1 \,I_1}{1+\gamma_1}, & I_1>0 \\[1em]
\displaystyle\frac{\sigma_\mathrm{eq}}{1-\gamma_1}\, \frac{\sigma_\mathrm{eq}}{1+\gamma_1},  & I_1\leq 0
\end{array}
\right.$$

with $\gamma_1\in[0, 1[$. The transition between the surfaces in the cross section $I_1=0$ is continuously differentiable. The criterion represents the "classical view" with respect to inelastic material behavior:

- pressure-sensitive material behavior for $I_1>0$ with $\nu_+^\mathrm{in}\in\left]-1,\,1/2\right]$ and
- pressure-insensitive material behavior for $I_1<0$ with $\nu_-^\mathrm{in}=1/2$

The Huber criterion can be used as a yield surface with an empirical restriction for Poisson's ratio at tension $\nu_+^\mathrm{in}\in[0.48, 1/2]$, which leads to $\gamma_1\in[0, 0.1155]$.

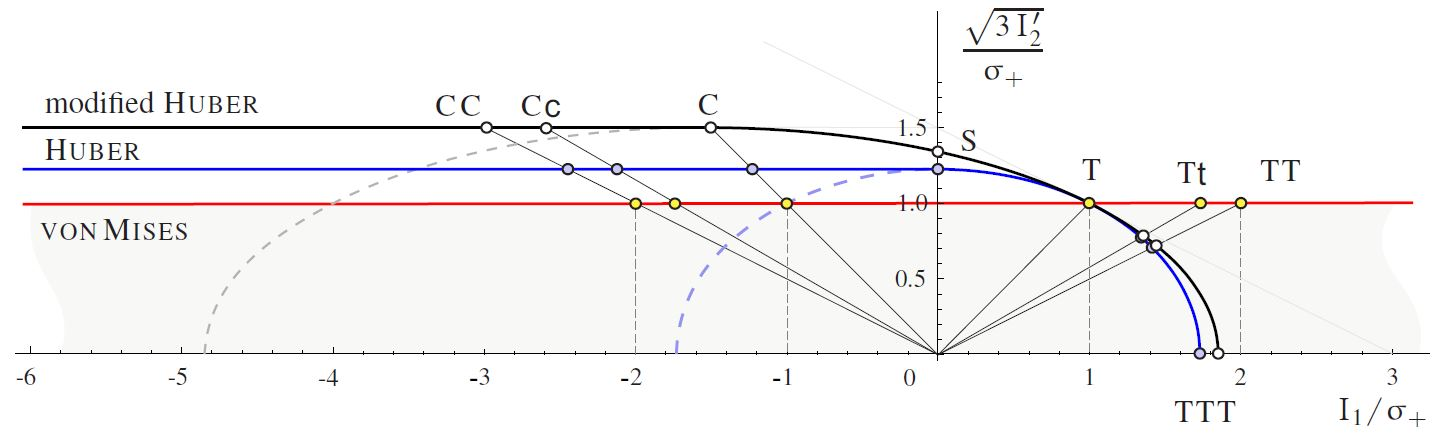
Huber criterion with $\gamma_1=1/\sqrt{3}$ and modified Huber criterion with $\gamma_1=(1+\sqrt{5})/6$ and $\gamma_2=(1-\sqrt{5})/6$ in the Burzyński-plane: setting according the normal stress hypothesis ($\nu_+^\mathrm{in}=0$). The von Mises criterion ($\nu_-^\mathrm{in}=\nu_+^\mathrm{in}=1/2$) is shown for comparison. C - uniaxial compression, Cc - biaxial compression in the stress relation 1:2, CC - equibiaxial compression, CCC - hydrostatic compression, S or TC - shear, T - uniaxial tension, Tt - biaxial tension in the stress relation 1:2, TT - equibiaxial tension, TTT - hydrostatic tension.

The modified Huber criterion, see also, cf.

$$3\,I_2' =
\left\{
\begin{array}{ll}
\displaystyle\frac{\sigma_\mathrm{eq}-\gamma_1 \,I_1}{1-\gamma_1} \, \frac{\sigma_\mathrm{eq}-\gamma_2 \,I_1}{1-\gamma_2}, & I_1>-d\,\sigma_\mathrm{+} \\[1em]
\displaystyle\frac{\sigma_\mathrm{eq}^2}{(1-\gamma_1-\gamma_2)^2},  & I_1\leq -d\,\sigma_\mathrm{+}
\end{array}
\right.$$

consists of the Schleicher ellipsoid with the restriction of Poisson's ratio at compression

$$\nu_-^\mathrm{in} = -     \frac{-1+
\gamma_1^2+\gamma_2^2-\gamma_1\,\gamma_2}
{(-2+\gamma_1+\gamma_2)\,(-1+\gamma_1+\gamma_2)}=\frac{1}{2}$$

and a cylinder with the $C^1$-transition in the cross section $I_1=-d\,\sigma_\mathrm{+}$. The second setting for the parameters $\gamma_1\in[0, 1[$ and $\gamma_2<0$ follows with the compression / tension relation

$$d=\frac{\sigma_-}{\sigma_+} =\frac{1}{1-\gamma_1-\gamma_2} \geq1$$

The modified Huber criterion can be better fitted to the measured data as the Huber criterion. For setting $\nu_+^\mathrm{in}=0.48$ it follows $\gamma_1=0.0880$ and $\gamma_2=-0.0747$.

The Huber criterion and the modified Huber criterion should be preferred to the von Mises criterion since one obtains safer results in the region $I_1>\sigma_\mathrm{+}$. For practical applications the third invariant of the deviator $I_3'$ should be considered in these criteria.

=== Mohr–Coulomb yield surface ===
The Mohr–Coulomb yield (failure) criterion is similar to the Tresca criterion, with additional provisions for materials with different tensile and compressive yield strengths. This model is often used to model concrete, soil or granular materials. The Mohr–Coulomb yield criterion may be expressed as:

$$\frac{m+1}{2}\max \Big(|\sigma_1 - \sigma_2|+K(\sigma_1 + \sigma_2) ~,~~
|\sigma_1 - \sigma_3|+K(\sigma_1 + \sigma_3) ~,~~
|\sigma_2 - \sigma_3|+K(\sigma_2 + \sigma_3) \Big) = S_{yc}$$

where

$$m = \frac {S_{yc}}{S_{yt}};  K = \frac {m-1}{m+1}$$

and the parameters $S_{yc}$ and $S_{yt}$ are the yield (failure) stresses of the material in uniaxial compression and tension, respectively. The formula reduces to the Tresca criterion if $S_{yc}=S_{yt}$.

Figure 5 shows Mohr–Coulomb yield surface in the three-dimensional space of principal stresses. It is a conical prism and $K$ determines the inclination angle of conical surface. Figure 6 shows Mohr–Coulomb yield surface in two-dimensional stress space. In Figure 6 $R_{r}$ and $R_{c}$ is used for $S_{yt}$ and $S_{yc}$, respectively, in the formula. It is a cross section of this conical prism on the plane of $\sigma_1, \sigma_2$. In Figure 6 Rr and Rc are used for Syc and Syt, respectively, in the formula.

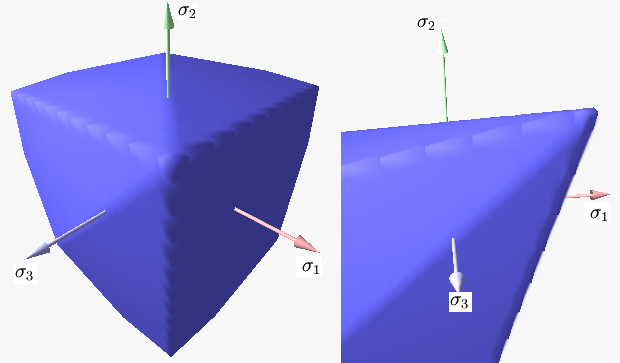
Figure 5: View of Mohr–Coulomb yield surface in 3D space of principal stresses

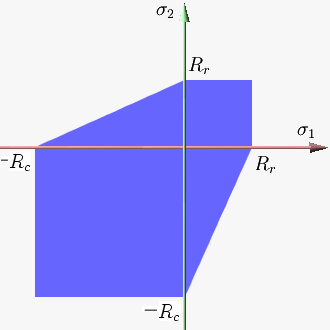
Figure 6: Mohr–Coulomb yield surface in 2D space ($\sigma_1, \sigma_2$)

=== Drucker–Prager yield surface ===
The Drucker–Prager yield criterion is similar to the von Mises yield criterion, with provisions for handling materials with differing tensile and compressive yield strengths. This criterion is most often used for concrete where both normal and shear stresses can determine failure. The Drucker–Prager yield criterion may be expressed as

$$\bigg(\frac {m-1}{2}\bigg) ( \sigma_1 + \sigma_2 + \sigma_3 ) + \bigg(\frac{m+1}{2}\bigg)\sqrt{\frac{(\sigma_1 - \sigma_2)^2 + (\sigma_2 - \sigma_3)^2 + (\sigma_3 - \sigma_1)^2}{2}} = S_{yc}$$

where

$$m = \frac{S_{yc}}{S_{yt}}$$

and $S_{yc}$, $S_{yt}$ are the uniaxial yield stresses in compression and tension respectively. The formula reduces to the von Mises equation if $S_{yc}=S_{yt}$.

Figure 7 shows Drucker–Prager yield surface in the three-dimensional space of principal stresses. It is a regular cone. Figure 8 shows Drucker–Prager yield surface in two-dimensional space. The elliptical elastic domain is a cross section of the cone on the plane of $\sigma_1, \sigma_2$; it can be chosen to intersect the Mohr–Coulomb yield surface in different number of vertices. One choice is to intersect the Mohr–Coulomb yield surface at three vertices on either side of the $\sigma_1 = -\sigma_2$ line, but usually selected by convention to be those in the compression regime. Another choice is to intersect the Mohr–Coulomb yield surface at four vertices on both axes (uniaxial fit) or at two vertices on the diagonal $\sigma_1 = \sigma_2$ (biaxial fit). The Drucker-Prager yield criterion is also commonly expressed in terms of the material cohesion and friction angle.

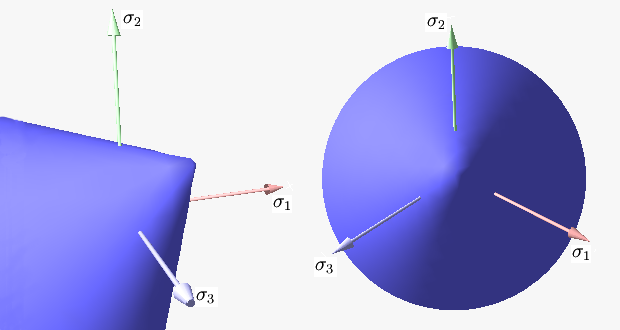
Figure 7: View of Drucker–Prager yield surface in 3D space of principal stresses

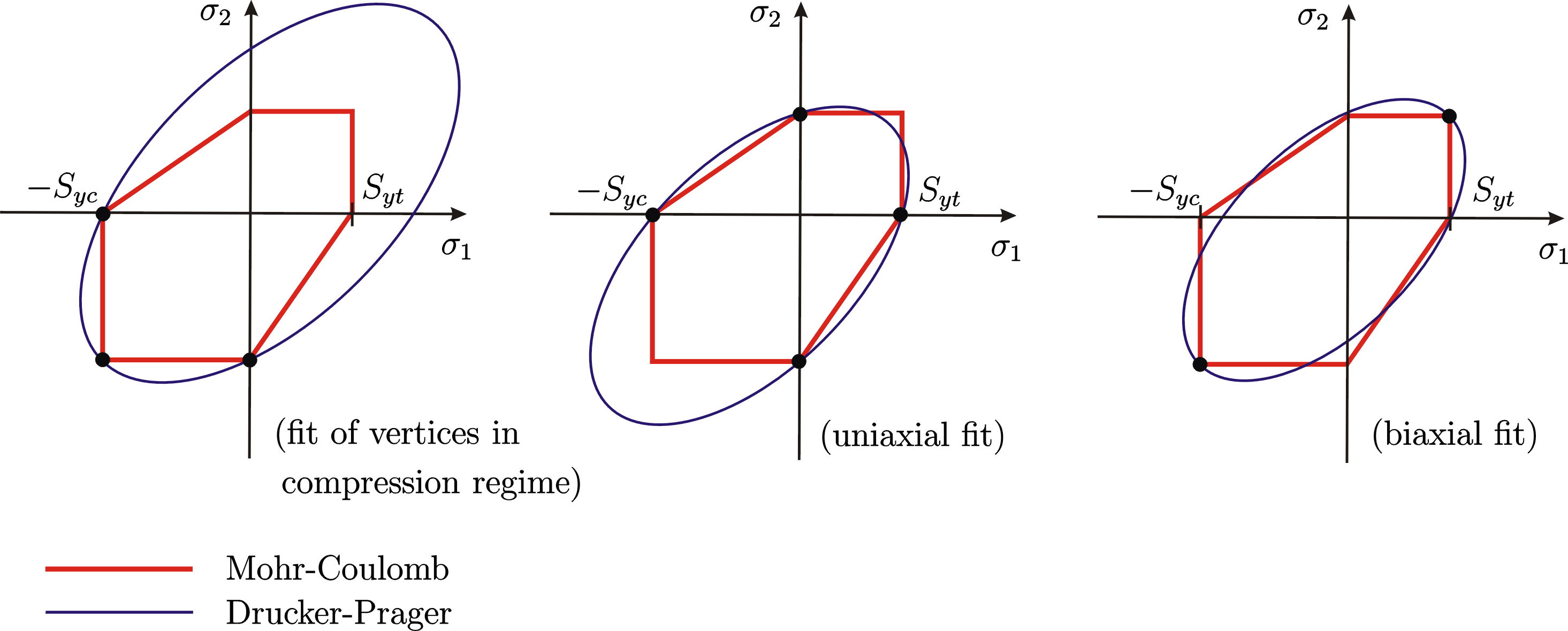
Figure 8: View of Drucker–Prager yield surface in 2D space of principal stresses

=== Bresler–Pister yield surface ===
The Bresler–Pister yield criterion is an extension of the Drucker Prager yield criterion that uses three parameters, and has additional terms for materials that yield under hydrostatic compression. In terms of the principal stresses, this yield criterion may be expressed as

$$S_{yc} = \tfrac{1}{\sqrt{2}}\left[(\sigma_1-\sigma_2)^2+(\sigma_2-\sigma_3)^2+(\sigma_3-\sigma_1)^2\right]^{1/2} - c_0 - c_1~(\sigma_1+\sigma_2+\sigma_3) - c_2~(\sigma_1+\sigma_2+\sigma_3)^2$$

where $c_0, c_1, c_2$ are material constants. The additional parameter $c_2$ gives the yield surface an ellipsoidal cross section when viewed from a direction perpendicular to its axis. If $\sigma_c$ is the yield stress in uniaxial compression, $\sigma_t$ is the yield stress in uniaxial tension, and $\sigma_b$ is the yield stress in biaxial compression, the parameters can be expressed as

$$\begin{align}
c_1 = & \left(\cfrac{\sigma_t-\sigma_c}{(\sigma_t+\sigma_c)}\right)
\left(\cfrac{4\sigma_b^2 - \sigma_b(\sigma_c+\sigma_t) + \sigma_c\sigma_t}{4\sigma_b^2 + 2\sigma_b(\sigma_t-\sigma_c) - \sigma_c\sigma_t} \right) \\
c_2 = & \left(\cfrac{1}{(\sigma_t+\sigma_c)}\right)
\left(\cfrac{\sigma_b(3\sigma_t-\sigma_c) -2\sigma_c\sigma_t}{4\sigma_b^2 + 2\sigma_b(\sigma_t-\sigma_c) - \sigma_c\sigma_t} \right) \\
c_0 = & c_1\sigma_c -c_2\sigma_c^2
\end{align}$$

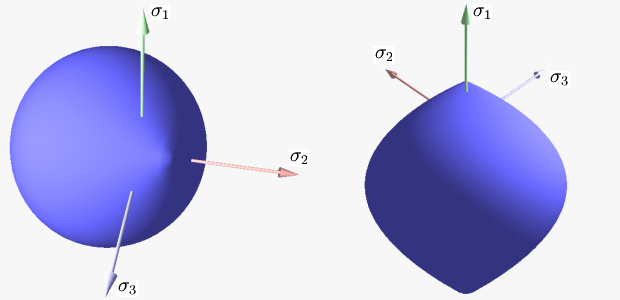
Figure 9: View of Bresler–Pister yield surface in 3D space of principal stresses

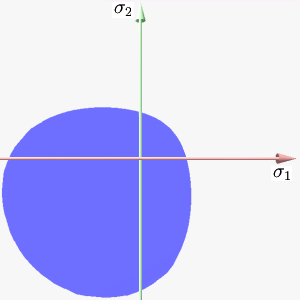
Figure 10: Bresler–Pister yield surface in 2D space ($\sigma_1, \sigma_2$)

=== Willam–Warnke yield surface ===
The Willam–Warnke yield criterion is a three-parameter smoothed version of the Mohr–Coulomb yield criterion that has similarities in form to the Drucker–Prager and Bresler–Pister yield criteria.

The yield criterion has the functional form

$$f(I_1, J_2, J_3) = 0 ~.$$

However, it is more commonly expressed in Haigh–Westergaard coordinates as

$$f(\xi, \rho, \theta) = 0 ~.$$

The cross-section of the surface when viewed along its axis is a smoothed triangle (unlike Mohr–Coulomb). The Willam–Warnke yield surface is convex and has unique and well defined first and second derivatives on every point of its surface. Therefore, the Willam–Warnke model is computationally robust and has been used for a variety of cohesive-frictional materials.

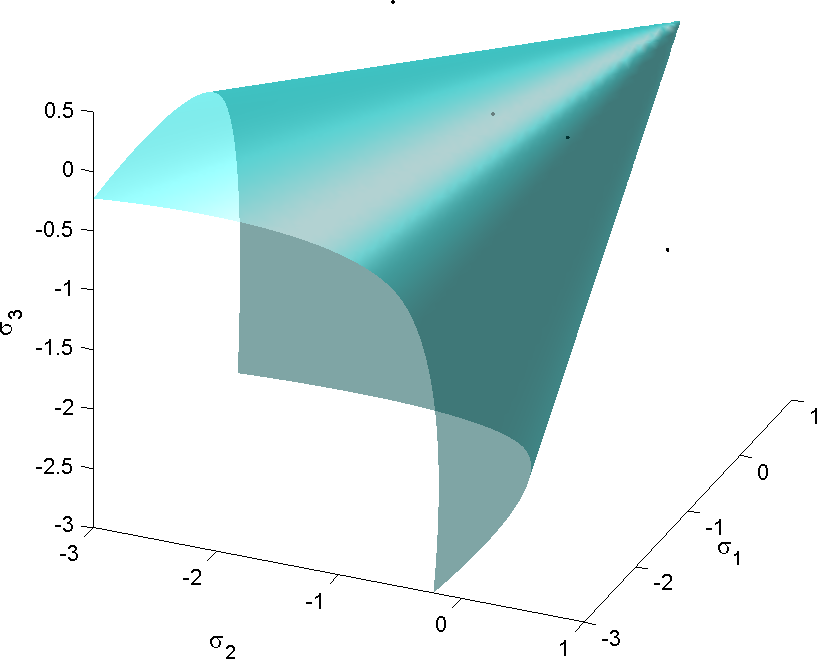
Figure 11: View of Willam–Warnke yield surface in 3D space of principal stresses

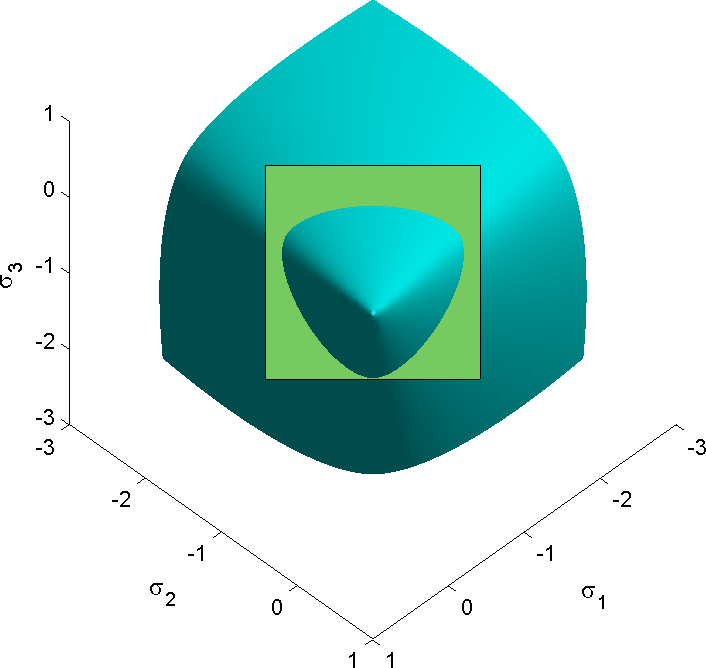
Figure 12: Willam–Warnke yield surface in the $\pi$-plane

=== Podgórski and Rosendahl trigonometric yield surfaces ===
Normalized with respect to the uniaxial tensile stress $\sigma_\mathrm{eq}=\sigma_+$, the Podgórski criterion as function of the stress angle $\theta$ reads

$$\sigma_\mathrm{eq}=\sqrt{3\,I_2'}\,\frac{\Omega_3(\theta, \beta_3, \chi_3)}{\Omega_3(0, \beta_3, \chi_3)},$$

with the shape function of trigonal symmetry in the $\pi$-plane

$$\Omega_3(\theta, \beta_3, \chi_3)=\cos\left[\displaystyle\frac{1}{3}\left(\pi \beta_3 -\arccos [\,\sin (\chi_3\,\frac{\pi}{2}) \,\!\cos 3\,\theta\,]\right)\right],  \qquad \beta_3\in[0,\,1], \quad \chi_3\in[-1,\,1].$$

It contains the criteria of von Mises (circle in the $\pi$-plane, $\beta_3=[0,\,1]$, $\chi_3=0$), Tresca (regular hexagon, $\beta_3=1/2$, $\chi_3=\{1, -1\}$), Mariotte (regular triangle, $\beta_3=\{0, 1\}$, $\chi_3=\{1, -1\}$), Ivlev (regular triangle, $\beta_3=\{1, 0\}$, $\chi_3=\{1, -1\}$) and also the cubic criterion of Sayir (the Ottosen criterion) with $\beta_3=\{0, 1\}$ and the isotoxal (equilateral) hexagons of the Capurso criterion with $\chi_3=\{1, -1\}$. The von Mises - Tresca transition follows with $\beta_3=1/2$, $\chi_3=[0, 1]$. The isogonal (equiangular) hexagons of the Haythornthwaite criterion containing the Schmidt-Ishlinsky criterion (regular hexagon) cannot be described with the Podgórski criterion.

The Rosendahl criterion reads

$$\sigma_\mathrm{eq}=\sqrt{3\,I_2'}\,\frac{\Omega_6(\theta, \beta_6, \chi_6)}{\Omega_6(0, \beta_6, \chi_6)},$$

with the shape function of hexagonal symmetry in the $\pi$-plane

$$\Omega_6(\theta, \beta_6, \chi_6)=\cos\left[\displaystyle\frac{1}{6}\left(\pi \beta_6 -\arccos [\,\sin (\chi_6\,\frac{\pi}{2})\,\!\cos 6\,\theta\,]\right)\right],  \qquad \beta_6\in[0,\,1], \quad \chi_6\in[-1,\,1].$$

It contains the criteria of von Mises (circle, $\beta_6=[0,\,1]$, $\chi_6=0$), Tresca (regular hexagon, $\beta_6=\{1, 0\}$, $\chi_6=\{1, -1\}$), Schmidt—Ishlinsky (regular hexagon, $\beta_6=\{0, 1\}$, $\chi_6=\{1, -1\}$), Sokolovsky (regular dodecagon, $\beta_6=1/2$, $\chi_6=\{1, -1\}$), and also the bicubic criterion with $\beta_6=0$ or equally with $\beta_6=1$ and the isotoxal dodecagons of the unified yield criterion of Yu with $\chi_6=\{1, -1\}$. The isogonal dodecagons of the multiplicative ansatz criterion of hexagonal symmetry containing the Ishlinsky-Ivlev criterion (regular dodecagon) cannot be described by the Rosendahl criterion.

The criteria of Podgórski and Rosendahl describe single surfaces in principal stress space without any additional outer contours and plane intersections. Note that in order to avoid numerical issues the real part function $Re$ can be introduced to the shape function: $Re(\Omega_{3})$ and $Re(\Omega_{6})$. The generalization in the form $\Omega_{3n}$ is relevant for theoretical investigations.

A pressure-sensitive extension of the criteria can be obtained with the linear $I_1$-substitution

$$\sigma_\mathrm{eq}\rightarrow
\frac{\sigma_\mathrm{eq}-\gamma_1\,I_1}{1-\gamma_1} \qquad\mbox{with}\qquad \gamma_1\in[0,\,1[,$$

which is sufficient for many applications, e.g. metals, cast iron, alloys, concrete, unreinforced polymers, etc.

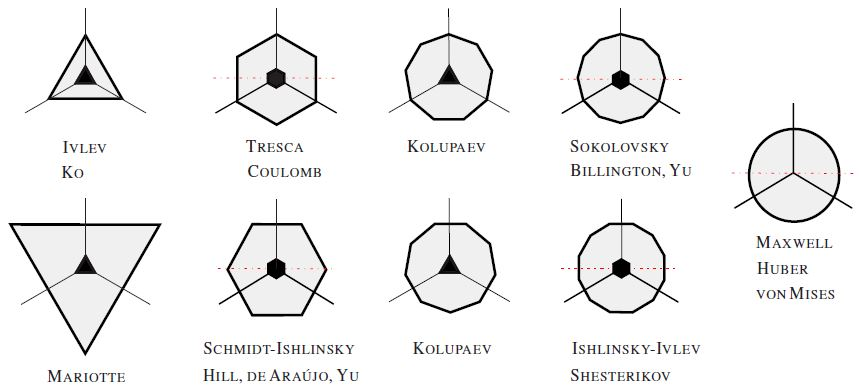
Basic cross sections described by a circle and regular polygons of trigonal or hexagonal symmetries in the $\pi$-plane.

=== Bigoni–Piccolroaz yield surface ===
The Bigoni–Piccolroaz yield criterion is a seven-parameter surface defined by

$$f(p,q,\theta) = F(p) + \frac{q}{g(\theta)} = 0,$$

where $F(p)$ is the "meridian" function

$$F(p) =
\left\{
\begin{array}{ll}
-M p_c \sqrt{(\phi - \phi^m)[2(1 - \alpha)\phi + \alpha]}, & \phi \in [0,1], \\
+\infty, & \phi \notin [0,1],
\end{array}
\right.$$

$$\phi = \frac{p + c}{p_c + c},$$

describing the pressure-sensitivity and $g(\theta)$ is the "deviatoric" function

$$g(\theta) = \frac{1}{\cos[\beta \frac{\pi}{6} - \frac{1}{3} \cos^{-1}(\gamma \cos 3\theta)]},$$

describing the Lode-dependence of yielding. The seven, non-negative material parameters:

$$\underbrace{M > 0,~ p_c > 0,~ c \geq 0,~ 0 < \alpha < 2,~ m > 1}_{\mbox{defining}~\displaystyle{F(p)}},~~~
\underbrace{0\leq \beta \leq 2,~ 0 \leq \gamma < 1}_{\mbox{defining}~\displaystyle{g(\theta)}},$$

define the shape of the meridian and deviatoric sections.

This criterion represents a smooth and convex surface, which is closed both in hydrostatic tension and compression and has a drop-like shape, particularly suited to describe frictional and granular materials. This criterion has also been generalized to the case of surfaces with corners.

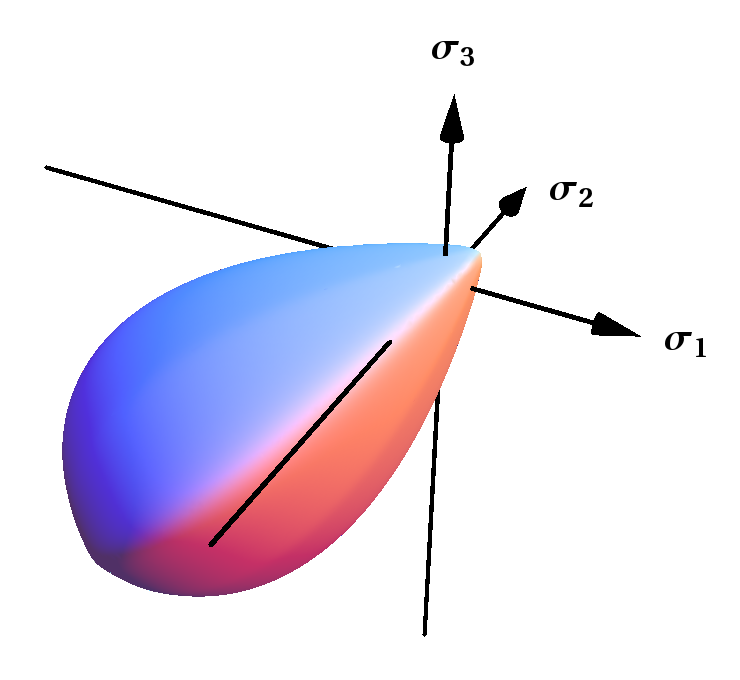
In 3D space of principal stresses

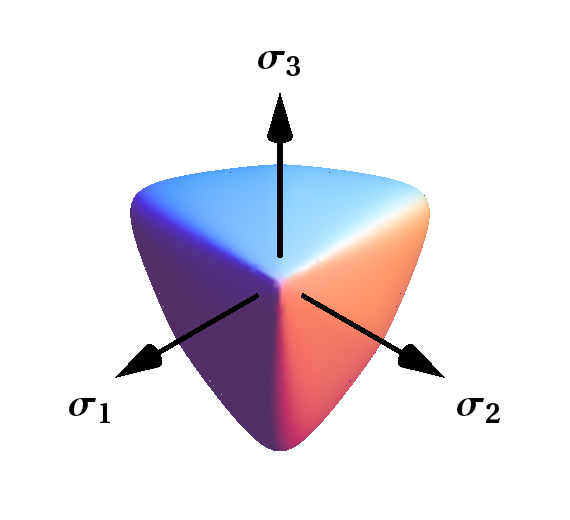
In the $\pi$-plane

Bigoni-Piccolroaz yield surface

=== Cosine Ansatz (Altenbach-Bolchoun-Kolupaev) ===
For the formulation of the strength criteria the stress angle

$$\cos 3\theta = \frac{3\sqrt{3}}{2}\frac{I_3'}{I_2'^{\frac{3}{2}}}$$

can be used.

The following criterion of isotropic material behavior

$$(3I_2')^3 \frac{1+c_3 \cos 3\theta+c_6 \cos^2 3\theta}{1+c_3+
c_6}=  \displaystyle
\left(\frac{\sigma_\mathrm{eq}-\gamma_1\,I_1}{1-\gamma_1}\right)^{6-l-m}\,
\left(\frac{\sigma_\mathrm{eq}-\gamma_2\,I_1}{1-\gamma_2}\right)^l \, \sigma_\mathrm{eq}^m$$

contains a number of other well-known less general criteria, provided suitable parameter values are chosen.

Parameters $c_3$ and $c_6$ describe the geometry of the surface in the $\pi$-plane. They are subject to the constraints

$$c_6=\frac{1}{4}(2+c_3), \qquad c_6=\frac{1}{4}(2-c_3), \qquad c_6\ge \frac{5}{12}\,c_3^2-\frac{1}{3},$$

which follow from the convexity condition. A more precise formulation of the third constraints is proposed in.

Parameters $\gamma_1\in[0,\,1[$ and $\gamma_2$ describe the position of the intersection points of the yield surface with hydrostatic axis (space diagonal in the principal stress space). These intersections points are called hydrostatic nodes. In the case of materials which do not fail at hydrostatic pressure (steel, brass, etc.) one gets $\gamma_2\in[0,\,\gamma_1[$. Otherwise for materials which fail at hydrostatic pressure (hard foams, ceramics, sintered materials, etc.) it follows $\gamma_2<0$.

The integer powers $l\geq0$ and $m\geq0$, $l+m< 6$ describe the curvature of the meridian. The meridian with $l=m=0$ is a straight line and with $l=0$ – a parabola.

=== Barlat's Yield Surface ===
For the anisotropic materials, depending on the direction of the applied process (e.g., rolling) the mechanical properties vary and, therefore, using an anisotropic yield function is crucial. Since 1989 Frederic Barlat has developed a family of yield functions for constitutive modelling of plastic anisotropy. Among them, Yld2000-2D yield criteria has been applied for a wide range of sheet metals (e.g., aluminum alloys and advanced high-strength steels). The Yld2000-2D model is a non-quadratic type yield function based on two linear transformation of the stress tensor:

$\Phi = \Phi '(X') + \Phi ''(X'') = 2{\bar \sigma ^a}$ :

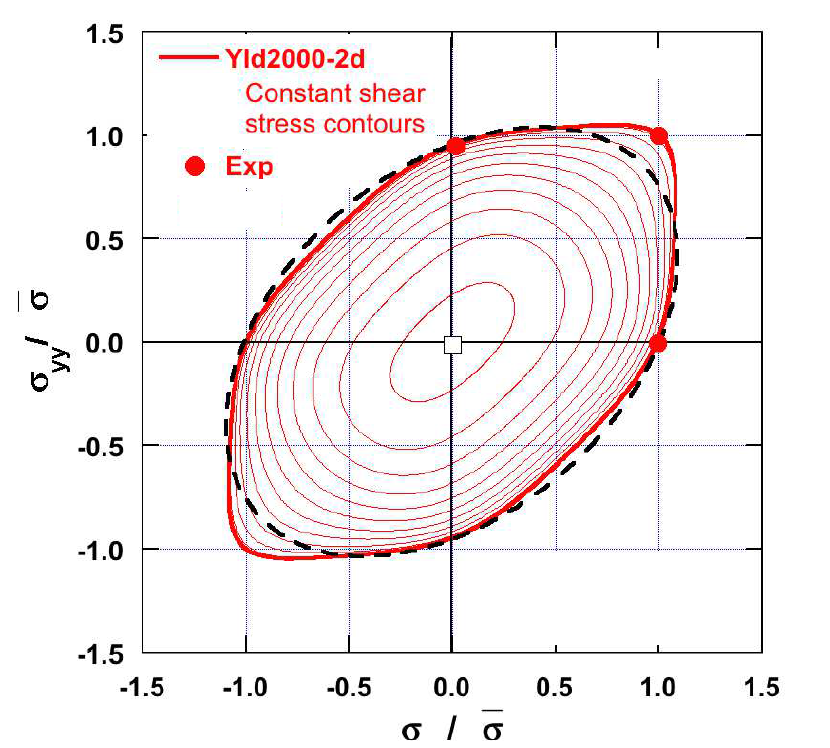
The Yld2000-2D yield loci for a AA6022 T4 sheet.

where $\bar \sigma$ is the effective stress. and $X'$ and $X''$ are the transformed matrices (by linear transformation C or L):
$$\begin{array}{l}
X' = C'.s = L'.\sigma \\
X'' = C''.s = L''.\sigma
\end{array}$$
where s is the deviatoric stress tensor.

for principal values of X’ and X”, the model could be expressed as:

$$\begin{array}{l}
\Phi ' = {\left| {{{X'}_1} + {{X'}_2}} \right|^a}\\
\Phi '' = {\left| {2{{X''}_2} + {{X''}_1}} \right|^a} + {\left| {2{{X''}_1} + {{X''}_2}} \right|^a}
\end{array}\$$

and:

$$\left[ {\begin{array}{*{20}{c}}
{{{L'}_{11}}}\\
{{{L'}_{12}}}\\
{{{L'}_{21}}}\\
{{{L'}_{22}}}\\
{{{L'}_{66}}}
\end{array}} \right] = \left[ {\begin{array}{*{20}{c}}
{2/3}&0&0\\
{ - 1/3}&0&0\\
0&{ - 1/3}&0\\
0&{ - 2/3}&0\\
0&0&1
\end{array}} \right]\left[ {\begin{array}{*{20}{c}}
{{\alpha _1}}\\
{{\alpha _2}}\\
{{\alpha _7}}
\end{array}} \right], \left[ {\begin{array}{*{20}{c}}
{{{L''}_{11}}}\\
{{{L''}_{12}}}\\
{{{L''}_{21}}}\\
{{{L''}_{22}}}\\
{{{L''}_{66}}}
\end{array}} \right] = \left[ {\begin{array}{*{20}{c}}
{ - 2}&2&8&{ - 2}&0\\
1&{ - 4}&{ - 4}&4&0\\
4&{ - 4}&{ - 4}&4&0\\
{ - 2}&8&2&{ - 2}&0\\
0&0&0&0&1
\end{array}} \right]\left[ {\begin{array}{*{20}{c}}
{{\alpha _3}}\\
{{\alpha _4}}\\
{{\alpha _5}}\\
{{\alpha _6}}\\
{{\alpha _8}}
\end{array}} \right]$$

where $\alpha _1 ... \alpha _8$ are eight parameters of the Barlat's Yld2000-2D model to be identified with a set of experiments.

== See also ==
- Yield (engineering)
- Plasticity (physics)
- Stress
- Henri Tresca
- von Mises stress
- Mohr–Coulomb theory
- Hill yield criterion
- Hosford yield criterion
- Strain
- Strain tensor
- Stress–energy tensor
- Stress concentration
- 3-D elasticity
- Frederic Barlat
