= Drucker–Prager yield criterion =

Concept in physics

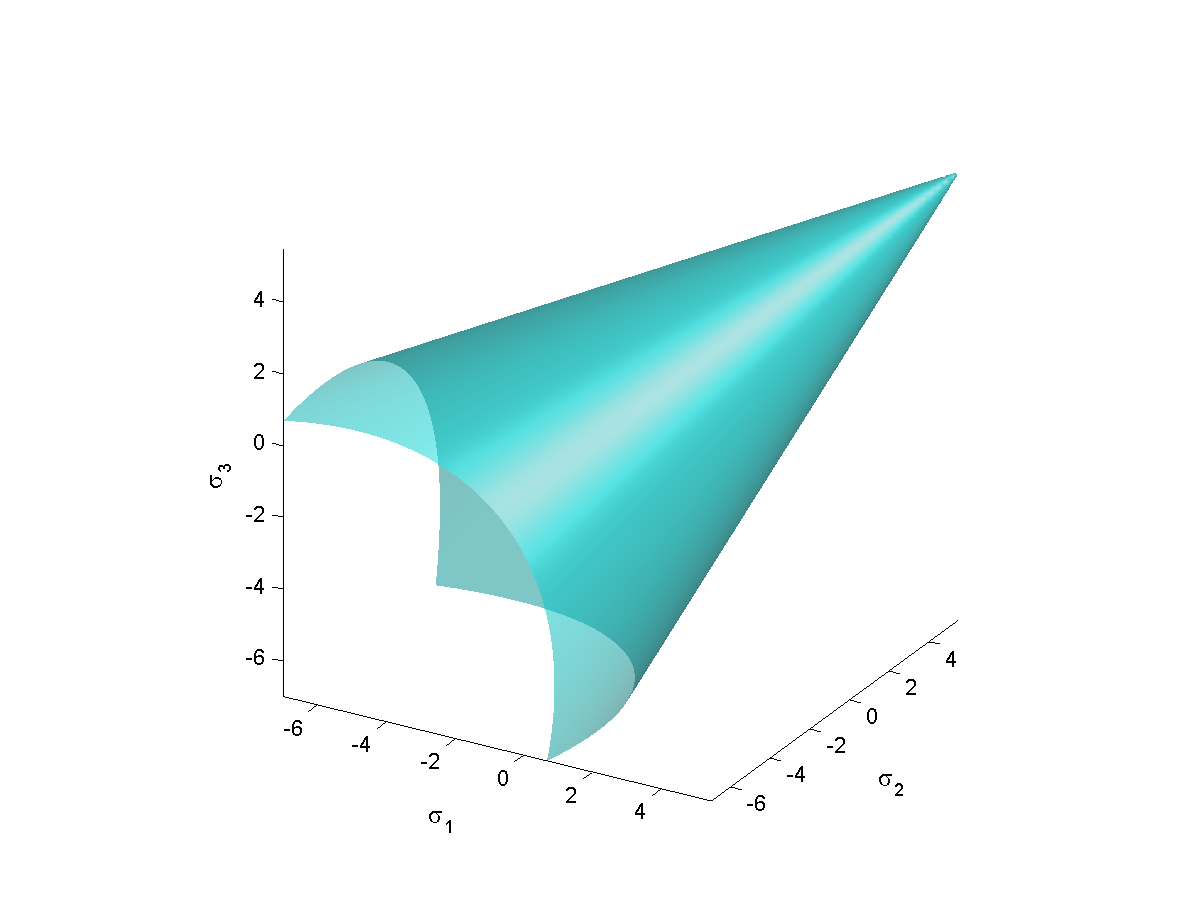
Figure 1: View of Drucker–Prager yield surface in 3D space of principal stresses for $c=2, \phi=-20^\circ$

The Drucker–Prager yield criterion is a pressure-dependent model for determining whether a material has failed or undergone plastic yielding. The criterion was introduced to deal with the plastic deformation of soils. It and its many variants have been applied to rock, concrete, polymers, foams, and other pressure-dependent materials.

The Drucker–Prager yield criterion has the form

$$\sqrt{J_2} = A + B~I_1$$

where $I_1$ is the first invariant of the Cauchy stress and $J_2$ is the second invariant of the deviatoric part of the Cauchy stress. The constants $A, B$ are determined from experiments.

In terms of the equivalent stress (or von Mises stress) and the hydrostatic (or mean) stress, the Drucker–Prager criterion can be expressed as

$$\sigma_e = a + b~\sigma_m$$

where $\sigma_e$ is the equivalent stress, $\sigma_m$ is the hydrostatic stress, and $a,b$ are material constants. The Drucker–Prager yield criterion expressed in Haigh–Westergaard coordinates is

$$\tfrac{1}{\sqrt{2}}\rho - \sqrt{3}~B\xi = A$$

The Drucker–Prager yield surface is a smooth version of the Mohr–Coulomb yield surface.

== Expressions for A and B ==
The Drucker–Prager model can be written in terms of the principal stresses as

$$\sqrt{\cfrac{1}{6}\left[(\sigma_1-\sigma_2)^2+(\sigma_2-\sigma_3)^2+(\sigma_3-\sigma_1)^2\right]} = A + B~(\sigma_1+\sigma_2+\sigma_3) ~.$$

If $\sigma_t$ is the yield stress in uniaxial tension, the Drucker–Prager criterion implies

$$\cfrac{1}{\sqrt{3}}~\sigma_t = A + B~\sigma_t ~.$$

If $\sigma_c$ is the yield stress in uniaxial compression, the Drucker–Prager criterion implies

$$\cfrac{1}{\sqrt{3}}~\sigma_c = A - B~\sigma_c ~.$$

Solving these two equations gives

$$A = \cfrac{2}{\sqrt{3}}~\left(\cfrac{\sigma_c~\sigma_t}{\sigma_c+\sigma_t}\right) ~;~~ B = \cfrac{1}{\sqrt{3}}~\left(\cfrac{\sigma_t-\sigma_c}{\sigma_c+\sigma_t}\right) ~.$$

=== Uniaxial asymmetry ratio ===
Different uniaxial yield stresses in tension and in compression are predicted by the Drucker–Prager model. The uniaxial asymmetry ratio for the Drucker–Prager model is

$$\beta = \cfrac{\sigma_\mathrm{c}}{\sigma_\mathrm{t}} = \cfrac{1 - \sqrt{3}~B}{1 + \sqrt{3}~B} ~.$$

=== Expressions in terms of cohesion and friction angle ===
Since the Drucker–Prager yield surface is a smooth version of the Mohr–Coulomb yield surface, it is often expressed in terms of the cohesion ($c$) and the angle of internal friction ($\phi$) that are used to describe the Mohr–Coulomb yield surface. If we assume that the Drucker–Prager yield surface circumscribes the Mohr–Coulomb yield surface then the expressions for $A$ and $B$ are

$$A = \cfrac{6~c~\cos\phi}{\sqrt{3}(3-\sin\phi)} ~;~~
B = \cfrac{2~\sin\phi}{\sqrt{3}(3-\sin\phi)}$$

If the Drucker–Prager yield surface middle circumscribes the Mohr–Coulomb yield surface then

$$A = \cfrac{6~c~\cos\phi}{\sqrt{3}(3+\sin\phi)} ~;~~
B = \cfrac{2~\sin\phi}{\sqrt{3}(3+\sin\phi)}$$

If the Drucker–Prager yield surface inscribes the Mohr–Coulomb yield surface then

$$A = \cfrac{3~c~\cos\phi}{\sqrt{9+3~\sin^2\phi}} ~;~~
B = \cfrac{\sin\phi}{\sqrt{9+3~\sin^2\phi}}$$

Derivation of expressions for $A,B$ in terms of $c,\phi$
The expression for the Mohr–Coulomb yield criterion in Haigh–Westergaard space is

$$\left[\sqrt{3}~\sin\left(\theta+\tfrac{\pi}{3}\right) - \sin\phi\cos\left(\theta+\tfrac{\pi}{3}\right)\right]\rho - \sqrt{2}\sin(\phi)\xi = \sqrt{6} c \cos\phi$$

If we assume that the Drucker–Prager yield surface circumscribes the Mohr–Coulomb yield surface such that the two surfaces coincide at $\theta=\tfrac{\pi}{3}$, then at those points the Mohr–Coulomb yield surface can be expressed as

$$\left[\sqrt{3}~\sin\tfrac{2\pi}{3} - \sin\phi\cos\tfrac{2\pi}{3}\right]\rho - \sqrt{2}\sin(\phi)\xi = \sqrt{6} c \cos\phi$$

or,

$$\tfrac{1}{\sqrt{2}}\rho - \cfrac{2\sin\phi}{3+\sin\phi}\xi = \cfrac{\sqrt{12} c \cos\phi}{3+\sin\phi}  \qquad \qquad (1.1)$$

The Drucker–Prager yield criterion expressed in Haigh–Westergaard coordinates is

$$\tfrac{1}{\sqrt{2}}\rho - \sqrt{3}~B\xi = A \qquad \qquad (1.2)$$

Comparing equations (1.1) and (1.2), we have

$$A = \cfrac{\sqrt{12} c \cos\phi}{3+\sin\phi} = \cfrac{6 c \cos\phi}{\sqrt{3}(3+\sin\phi)} ~;~~ B = \cfrac{2\sin\phi}{\sqrt{3}(3+\sin\phi)}$$

These are the expressions for $A,B$ in terms of $c,\phi$.

On the other hand, if the Drucker–Prager surface inscribes the Mohr–Coulomb surface, then matching the two surfaces at $\theta=0$ gives

$$A = \cfrac{6 c \cos\phi}{\sqrt{3}(3-\sin\phi)} ~;~~ B = \cfrac{2\sin\phi}{\sqrt{3}(3-\sin\phi)}$$

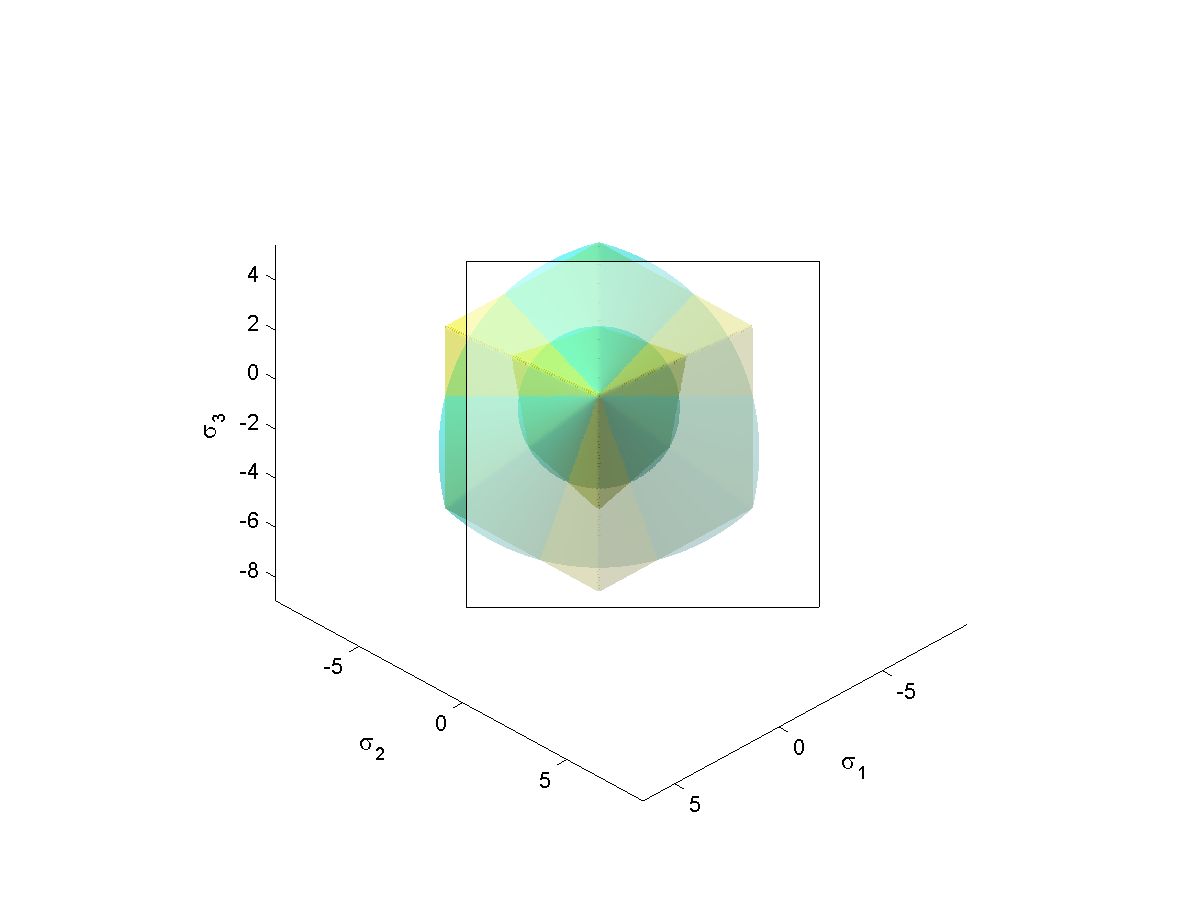
Comparison of Drucker–Prager and Mohr–Coulomb (inscribed) yield surfaces in the $\pi$-plane for $c = 2, \phi = 20^\circ$

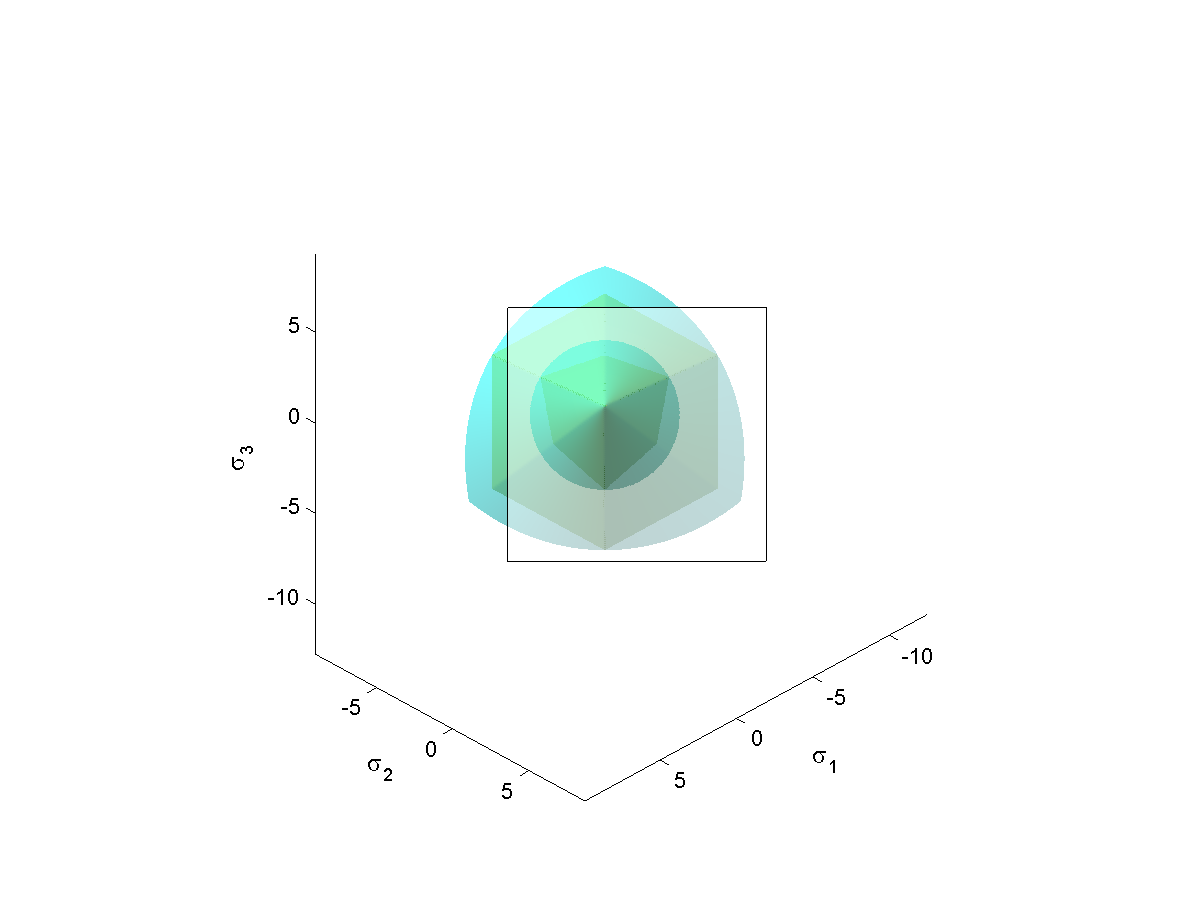
Comparison of Drucker–Prager and Mohr–Coulomb (circumscribed) yield surfaces in the $\pi$-plane for $c = 2, \phi = 20^\circ$

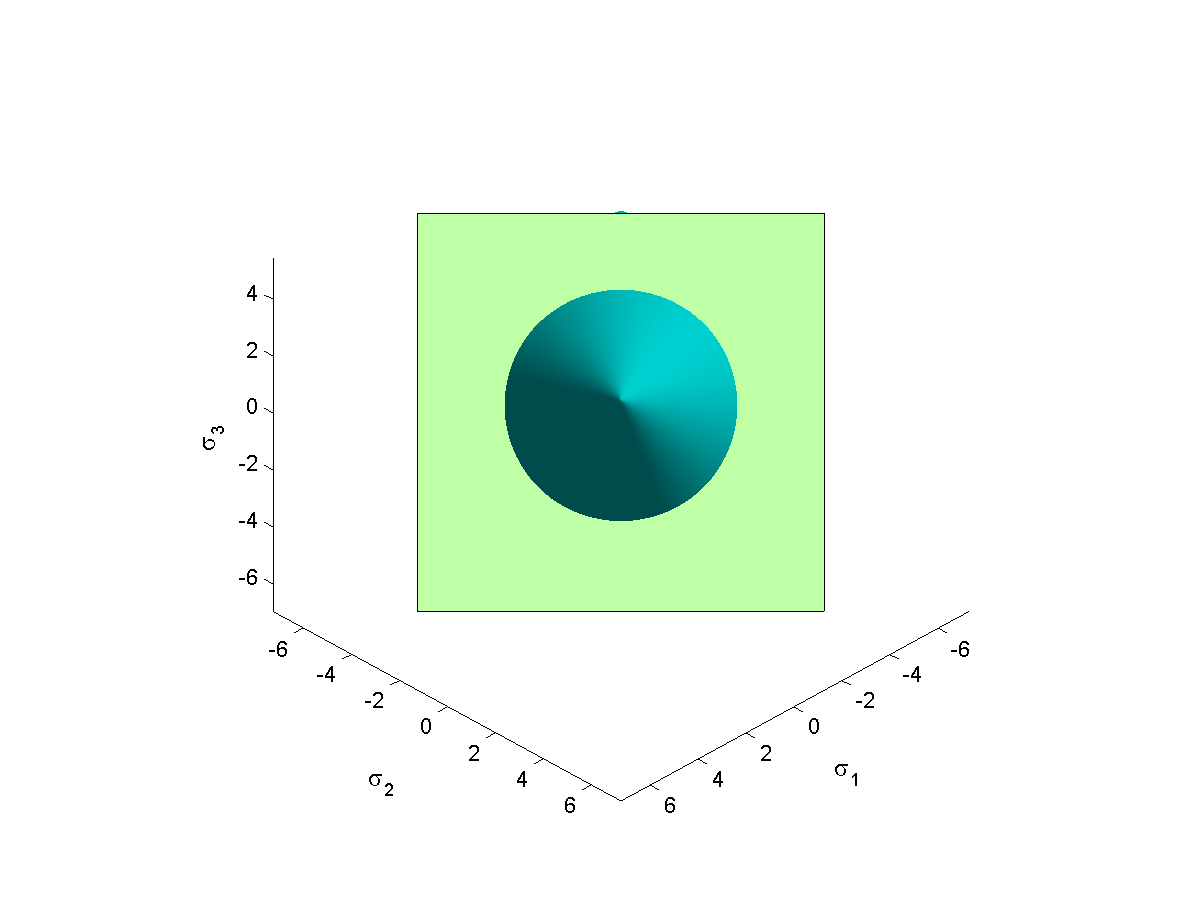
Figure 2: Drucker–Prager yield surface in the $\pi$-plane for $c = 2, \phi = 20^\circ$

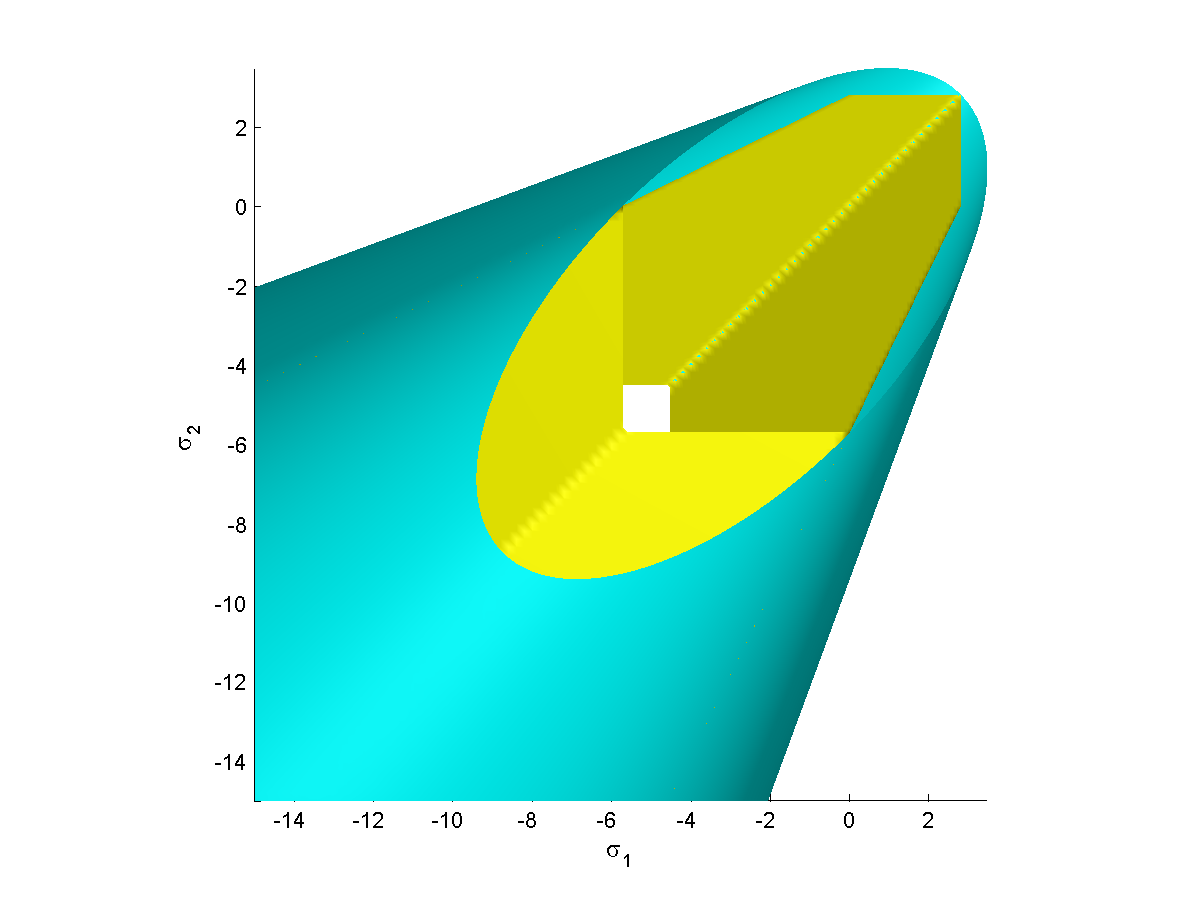
Figure 3: Trace of the Drucker–Prager and Mohr–Coulomb yield surfaces in the $\sigma_1-\sigma_2$-plane for $c = 2, \phi = 20^\circ$. Yellow = Mohr–Coulomb, Cyan = Drucker–Prager.

== Drucker–Prager model for polymers ==
The Drucker–Prager model has been used to model polymers such as polyoxymethylene and polypropylene. For polyoxymethylene the yield stress is a linear function of the pressure. However, polypropylene shows a quadratic pressure-dependence of the yield stress.

== Drucker–Prager model for foams ==
For foams, the GAZT model uses

$$A = \pm \cfrac{\sigma_y}{\sqrt{3}} ~;~~ B = \mp \cfrac{1}{\sqrt{3}}~\left(\cfrac{\rho}{5~\rho_s}\right)$$

where $\sigma_{y}$ is a critical stress for failure in tension or compression, $\rho$ is the density of the foam, and $\rho_s$ is the density of the base material.

== Extensions of the isotropic Drucker–Prager model ==
The Drucker–Prager criterion can also be expressed in the alternative form

$$J_2 = (A + B~I_1)^2 = a + b~I_1 + c~I_1^2 ~.$$

=== Deshpande–Fleck yield criterion or isotropic foam yield criterion ===
The Deshpande–Fleck yield criterion for foams has the form given in above equation. The parameters $a, b, c$ for the Deshpande–Fleck criterion are

$$a = (1 + \beta^2)~\sigma_y^2 ~,~~
b = 0 ~,~~
c = -\cfrac{\beta^2}{3}$$

where $\beta$ is a parameter that determines the shape of the yield surface, and $\sigma_y$ is the yield stress in tension or compression.

== Anisotropic Drucker–Prager yield criterion ==
An anisotropic form of the Drucker–Prager yield criterion is the Liu–Huang–Stout yield criterion. This yield criterion is an extension of the generalized Hill yield criterion and has the form

$$\begin{align}
f := & \sqrt{F(\sigma_{22}-\sigma_{33})^2+G(\sigma_{33}-\sigma_{11})^2+H(\sigma_{11}-\sigma_{22})^2
+ 2L\sigma_{23}^2+2M\sigma_{31}^2+2N\sigma_{12}^2}\\
&  + I\sigma_{11}+J\sigma_{22}+K\sigma_{33} - 1 \le 0
\end{align}$$

The coefficients $F,G,H,L,M,N,I,J,K$ are

$$\begin{align}
F = & \cfrac{1}{2}\left[\Sigma_2^2 + \Sigma_3^2 - \Sigma_1^2\right] ~;~~
G = \cfrac{1}{2}\left[\Sigma_3^2 + \Sigma_1^2 - \Sigma_2^2\right] ~;~~
H = \cfrac{1}{2}\left[\Sigma_1^2 + \Sigma_2^2 - \Sigma_3^2\right] \\
L = & \cfrac{1}{2(\sigma_{23}^y)^2} ~;~~
M =  \cfrac{1}{2(\sigma_{31}^y)^2} ~;~~
N =  \cfrac{1}{2(\sigma_{12}^y)^2} \\
I = & \cfrac{\sigma_{1c}-\sigma_{1t}}{2\sigma_{1c}\sigma_{1t}} ~;~~
J = \cfrac{\sigma_{2c}-\sigma_{2t}}{2\sigma_{2c}\sigma_{2t}} ~;~~
K = \cfrac{\sigma_{3c}-\sigma_{3t}}{2\sigma_{3c}\sigma_{3t}}
\end{align}$$

where

$$\Sigma_1 := \cfrac{\sigma_{1c}+\sigma_{1t}}{2\sigma_{1c}\sigma_{1t}} ~;~~
\Sigma_2 := \cfrac{\sigma_{2c}+\sigma_{2t}}{2\sigma_{2c}\sigma_{2t}} ~;~~
\Sigma_3 := \cfrac{\sigma_{3c}+\sigma_{3t}}{2\sigma_{3c}\sigma_{3t}}$$

and $\sigma_{ic}, i=1,2,3$ are the uniaxial yield stresses in compression in the three principal directions of anisotropy, $\sigma_{it}, i=1,2,3$ are the uniaxial yield stresses in tension, and $\sigma_{23}^y, \sigma_{31}^y, \sigma_{12}^y$ are the yield stresses in pure shear. It has been assumed in the above that the quantities $\sigma_{1c},\sigma_{2c},\sigma_{3c}$ are positive and $\sigma_{1t},\sigma_{2t},\sigma_{3t}$ are negative.

== The Drucker yield criterion ==
The Drucker–Prager criterion should not be confused with the earlier Drucker criterion which is independent of the pressure ($I_1$). The Drucker yield criterion has the form

$$f := J_2^3 - \alpha~J_3^2 - k^2 \le 0$$

where $J_2$ is the second invariant of the deviatoric stress, $J_3$ is the third invariant of the deviatoric stress, $\alpha$ is a constant that lies between -27/8 and 9/4 (for the yield surface to be convex), $k$ is a constant that varies with the value of $\alpha$. For $\alpha=0$, $k^2 = \cfrac{\sigma_y^6}{27}$ where $\sigma_y$ is the yield stress in uniaxial tension.

== Anisotropic Drucker Criterion ==
An anisotropic version of the Drucker yield criterion is the Cazacu–Barlat (CZ) yield criterion which has the form

$$f := (J_2^0)^3 - \alpha~(J_3^0)^2 - k^2 \le 0$$

where $J_2^0, J_3^0$ are generalized forms of the deviatoric stress and are defined as

$$\begin{align}
J_2^0  := & \cfrac{1}{6}\left[a_1(\sigma_{22}-\sigma_{33})^2+a_2(\sigma_{33}-\sigma_{11})^2 +a_3(\sigma_{11}-\sigma_{22})^2\right] + a_4\sigma_{23}^2 + a_5\sigma_{31}^2 + a_6\sigma_{12}^2 \\
J_3^0  := & \cfrac{1}{27}\left[(b_1+b_2)\sigma_{11}^3 +(b_3+b_4)\sigma_{22}^3 + \{2(b_1+b_4)-(b_2+b_3)\}\sigma_{33}^3\right] \\
& -\cfrac{1}{9}\left[(b_1\sigma_{22}+b_2\sigma_{33})\sigma_{11}^2+(b_3\sigma_{33}+b_4\sigma_{11})\sigma_{22}^2
+ \{(b_1-b_2+b_4)\sigma_{11}+(b_1-b_3+b_4)\sigma_{22}\}\sigma_{33}^2\right] \\
& + \cfrac{2}{9}(b_1+b_4)\sigma_{11}\sigma_{22}\sigma_{33} + 2 b_{11}\sigma_{12}\sigma_{23}\sigma_{31}\\
& - \cfrac{1}{3}\left[\{2b_9\sigma_{22}-b_8\sigma_{33}-(2b_9-b_8)\sigma_{11}\}\sigma_{31}^2+
\{2b_{10}\sigma_{33}-b_5\sigma_{22}-(2b_{10}-b_5)\sigma_{11}\}\sigma_{12}^2 \right.\\
& \qquad \qquad\left. \{(b_6+b_7)\sigma_{11} - b_6\sigma_{22}-b_7\sigma_{33}\}\sigma_{23}^2
\right]
\end{align}$$

=== Cazacu–Barlat yield criterion for plane stress ===
For thin sheet metals, the state of stress can be approximated as plane stress. In that case the Cazacu–Barlat yield criterion reduces to its two-dimensional version with

$$\begin{align}
J_2^0  = & \cfrac{1}{6}\left[(a_2+a_3)\sigma_{11}^2+(a_1+a_3)\sigma_{22}^2-2a_3\sigma_1\sigma_2\right]+ a_6\sigma_{12}^2 \\
J_3^0  = & \cfrac{1}{27}\left[(b_1+b_2)\sigma_{11}^3 +(b_3+b_4)\sigma_{22}^3 \right]
-\cfrac{1}{9}\left[b_1\sigma_{11}+b_4\sigma_{22}\right]\sigma_{11}\sigma_{22}
+ \cfrac{1}{3}\left[b_5\sigma_{22}+(2b_{10}-b_5)\sigma_{11}\right]\sigma_{12}^2
\end{align}$$

For thin sheets of metals and alloys, the parameters of the Cazacu–Barlat yield criterion are

Table 1. Cazacu–Barlat yield criterion parameters for sheet metals and alloys
Material	$a_1$	$a_2$	$a_3$	$a_6$	$b_1$	$b_2$	$b_3$	$b_4$	$b_5$	$b_{10}$	$\alpha$
6016-T4 Aluminum Alloy	0.815	0.815	0.334	0.42	0.04	-1.205	-0.958	0.306	0.153	-0.02	1.4
2090-T3 Aluminum Alloy	1.05	0.823	0.586	0.96	1.44	0.061	-1.302	-0.281	-0.375	0.445	1.285

== See also ==
- Yield surface
- Yield (engineering)
- Plasticity (physics)
- Material failure theory
- Daniel C. Drucker
- William Prager
