= Geoffrey Oliver =

Royal Navy Admiral (1898–1980)

Admiral Sir Geoffrey Oliver GBE KCB DSO**
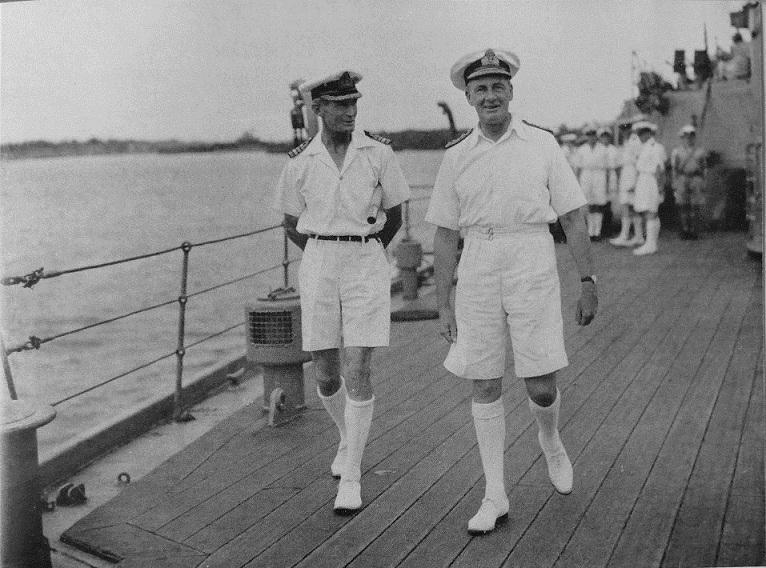
- Oliver (left) with Admiral Sir James Somerville in 1942
- Born: 22 January 1898
- Died: 26 May 1980 (aged 82)
- Military career
- Allegiance: United Kingdom
- Branch: Royal Navy
- Service years: 1915–1955
- Rank: Admiral
- Commands: Nore Command (1953–55); East Indies Station (1950–52); Royal Naval College, Greenwich (1948–50); Assistant Chief of Naval Staff (1946–48); Royal Naval Air Stations (1946); 21st Aircraft Carrier Squadron (1945); 1st Aircraft Carrier Squadron (1944–45); Naval Force "J" (Operation Neptune) (1944); Naval Force "N" (Operation Torch) (1943); Senior Officer Inshore Squadron, North Africa (1943); HMS Hermione (1940–43)
- Conflicts: First World War; Second World War: Bismarck; Siege of Malta; Operation Torch; Operation Husky; Operation Neptune
- Awards: Knight Grand Cross of the Order of the British Empire; Knight Commander of the Order of the Bath; Distinguished Service Order & Two Bars; Mentioned in dispatches (2); Legion of Merit (United States); Commander Grand Cross of the Order of the Sword (Sweden)

Admiral Sir Geoffrey Nigel Oliver GBE KCB DSO & Two Bars (22 January 1898 – 26 May 1980) was a Royal Navy officer during the Second World War.

== Early career ==
The oldest son of a botanist, Professor Francis Wall Oliver, Geoffrey Oliver was educated at Durnford Preparatory School in Langton Matravers, and at Rugby School, and joined the Royal Navy in 1915 as a Special Entry Cadet at Keyham College. He was assigned as a midshipman to HMS Dreadnought in 1916.

In May 1917 he was reassigned to HMS Renown and in September promoted to sub-lieutenant. In October 1918 he was promoted again, to lieutenant following technical courses in which he performed brilliantly, obtaining First Class certificates in all five subjects, and receiving the Goodenough Medal and prize as the best gunnery student in his year.

After a short period serving on HMS Resolution, in 1920 he attended two terms at Queens' College, Cambridge to make up for the short education he received because of the war, followed by promotion courses into 1921. Following this he specialised in gunnery and underwent training at the Royal Navy gunnery school, HMS Excellent, in Portsmouth. He was top of his class in both theory and practical work and was awarded the Commander Egerton prize for the best examination result in practical gunnery.

He joined the school as a staff member in the Experimental Department in March 1924. In August 1925 he was assigned as gunnery officer to HMS Carlisle, which was serving on the China Station where he remained into 1927. He was promoted to Lieutenant-Commander in October 1926.

In 1928 he returned to the Experimental Department of HMS Excellent, and in January 1930 became gunnery officer on HMS Rodney, which at that time was part of the Atlantic Fleet. In March 1932 he returned once again to HMS Excellent, as head of the Experimental Department. Between 1934 and 1936 he commanded HMS Diana and then HMS Veteran.

He married Barbara Jones, daughter of a jurist, Sir Francis A. Jones, in 1933. The couple had three children, of whom only one son survived. His second son died aged 8 of pneumonia, and his daughter died in a bathing accident during a holiday in Norfolk.

== Second World War ==
In June 1937 he was promoted to captain and the following year joined the naval staff at the Admiralty, in the Tactical Division. In May 1939, a few months before the outbreak of the Second World War, he became deputy director of the Training and Staff Duties Division.

In October 1940 he was given command of a Dido-class light cruiser, HMS Hermione, then under construction on the Clyde. The ship worked up at Scapa Flow and as part of the Second Cruiser Squadron took part in the May 1941 hunt for the Bismarck. The ship was then assigned to Force H based at Gibraltar on convoy duties to relieve Malta. The ship rammed the Italian 600-Serie Adua-class submarine Tembien near Tunis on 2 July 1941, for which Oliver was awarded a Distinguished Service Order (DSO) in November.

In 1942 the ship was part of the force which captured the Vichy French island of Madagascar after which it was assigned to Admiral Sir Henry Harwood's Eastern Mediterranean fleet.

In June 1942 as part of the 15th Cruiser Squadron the cruiser took part in Operation Vigorous, an attempt to supply Malta with a convoy dispatched from the Eastern Mediterranean whilst another Malta-bound convoy was simultaneously dispatched from Gibraltar (Operation Harpoon). On 15 June, Operation Vigorous was abandoned because of the strength of the air attacks, the depletion of ammunition and fuel caused by them and the nearby presence of the Italian Fleet. The convoy turned away from Malta and headed back towards Alexandria, but early the following morning Hermione was torpedoed and sunk by U-205 south of Crete with the loss of 87 crew out of 570.

Oliver survived the sinking and served as naval liaison officer to the Nile Delta Army for the next few months, until October 1942 when he was promoted to Commodore 2nd Class and assigned in Gibraltar to organise shipping for Operation Torch, the invasion of French North Africa.

Following the successful invasion, in January 1943 he was assigned as the senior officer of the North Africa Inshore Squadron, based at Bone, Algeria which at that time was under repeated air attack, until May 1943 when he moved to a newly captured base at Bizerte. For his work during Operation Torch, Oliver was awarded a Bar to his DSO and American Legion of Merit.

In July 1943 he became commander of Force "N", with its headquarters at the Algiers naval base HMS Hannibal, for Operation Husky, the invasion of Sicily which took place on 9 July. He was the naval commander of the British assault force at Salerno on HMS Hilary. Following the successful conclusion of the operation he was appointed a Companion of the Order of the Bath and upgraded to a Commander of the American Legion of Merit.

From late 1943 until February 1944 he was the chairman of a commission, "Accuracy of Gunnery Committee". He was then promoted to commodore 1st Class and assigned as commander of Force "J" for Operation Neptune, the invasion of Normandy, for which he was awarded a second Bar to his DSO.

From October 1944 until February 1945 he was in command of the First Aircraft Carrier Squadron on HMS Royalist, part of the Eastern Fleet, clearing mines in the Aegean Sea and providing humanitarian relief. He was promoted to rear admiral in May 1945 when the force was attached to the Eastern Fleet's 21st Aircraft Carrier Squadron where it took part in the amphibious landing at Rangoon. When Japan surrendered in August 1945 the force was preparing for the attack on the Malay Peninsula.

== Postwar ==
In 1946 he was president of a committee examining aircraft maintenance, and in April was appointed Flag Officer in command of Naval Air Stations. In December 1946 he became a Lord Commissioner of the Admiralty and Assistant Chief of Naval Staff, posts he held until September 1948 when he became President of the Royal Naval College, Greenwich. He was promoted to vice admiral in February 1949.

From April 1950 until August 1952 he was Commander-in-Chief, East Indies Station, and promoted to admiral in May 1952. He was appointed a Knight Commander of the Order of the Bath on 1 January 1951. In May 1953 he became Commander-in-Chief, The Nore, a capacity he served in until April 1955. He was appointed a Knight Grand Cross of the Order of the British Empire on 1 January 1955.

He retired from the Royal Navy on 1 December 1955, and moved to a farm he purchased near Henfield, West Sussex.

Military offices
Preceded by Sir Patrick Brind	President, Royal Naval College, Greenwich; 1948–1950	Succeeded by Sir Harold Kinahan
Preceded by Sir Charles Woodhouse	Commander-in-Chief, East Indies Station; 1950–1952	Succeeded by Sir William Slayter
Preceded by Sir Cyril Douglas-Pennant	Commander-in-Chief, The Nore; 1953–1955	Succeeded by Sir Frederick Parham
