= Bernard Haigh =

Scottish mechanical engineer

Bernard Parker Haigh
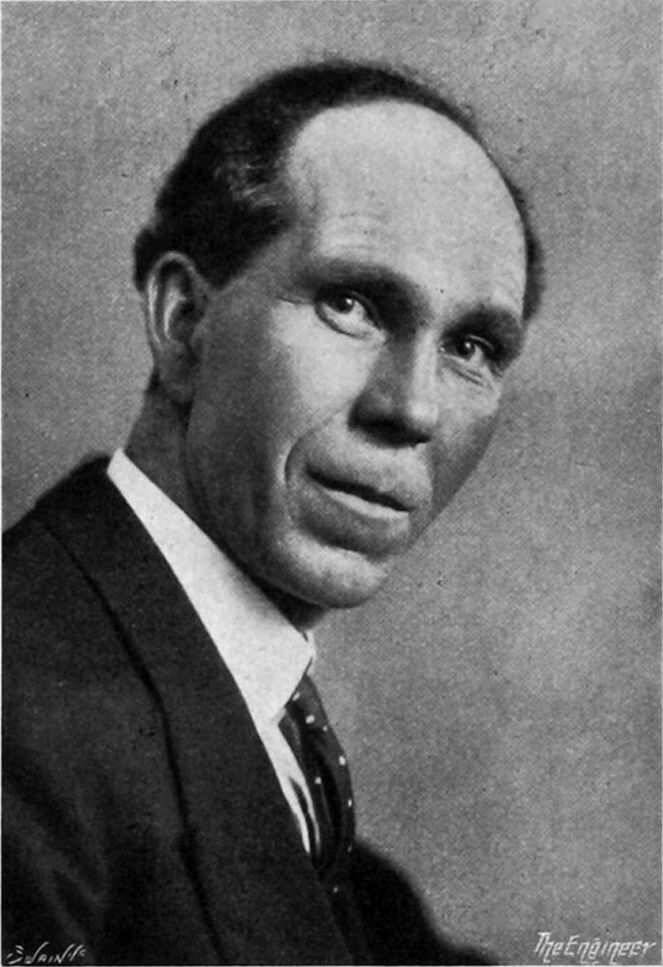
- Professor Bernard Parker Haigh
- Born: 8 July 1884; Edinburgh, Scotland
- Died: 18 January 1941 (aged 56); Greenwich, London, England
- Citizenship: United Kingdom
- Education: University of Glasgow
- Known for: Haigh diagram, Haigh-Westergaard stress space, Beltrami-Haigh yield criterion
- Spouse: Mildred May Cole
- Children: One
- Scientific career
- Fields: Applied mechanics
- Workplaces: University of Glasgow, Royal Naval College
- Thesis: Alternating stress testing machine with record of researches carried out (1915)

Bernard Parker Haigh, MBE (8 July 1884 – 18 January 1941) was a Scottish mechanical engineer. Haigh was educated at Allan Glen's School and the University of Glasgow He served as professor of applied mechanics at the Royal Naval College in Greenwich.

Haigh is known for his contributions in the fields of metal fatigue, welding and theory of plasticity. He is particularly known for Haigh diagram.

In 1913 Haigh became a lecturer in applied mechanics at the Royal Naval College.

== Notable publications ==
- A new machine for alternating load tests (1912)
- Report on Alternating Stress Tests of a Sample of Mild Steel received from the British Association Stress Committee (1916)
- Experiments on the fatigue of brasses (1917)
- Strain-energy Function and the Elastic-limit (1920)
- Strain-energy Function and the Elastic limit (1922)
- Stresses in Bridges (1924)
- Hysteresis in relation to cohesion and fatigue (1928)
- Electric welding as an integral part of structural design (1939)
