= Admiral Luce =

Admiral Luce may refer to:

- David Luce (1906–1971), British Royal Navy admiral
- John Luce (Royal Navy officer) (1870–1932), British Royal Navy rear admiral
- Stephen Luce (1827–1917), U.S. Navy admiral

== See also ==
- Martin Lucey (1920–1992), British Royal Navy rear admiral
