= Bigoni–Piccolroaz yield criterion =

Yield criterion

The Bigoni–Piccolroaz yield criterion is a yielding model, based on a phenomenological approach, capable of describing the mechanical behavior of a broad class of pressure-sensitive granular materials such as soil, concrete, porous metals and ceramics.

== General concepts ==
The hardening process during hydrostatic powder compaction described with the Bigoni & Piccolroaz yield surface.

The idea behind the Bigoni-Piccolroaz criterion is that of deriving a function capable of transitioning between the yield surfaces typical of different classes of materials only by changing the function parameters. The reason for this kind of implementation lies in the fact that the materials towards which the model is targeted undergo consistent changes during manufacturing and working conditions. The typical example is that of the hardening of a power specimen by compaction and sintering during which the material changes from granular to dense.

The Bigoni-Piccolroaz yielding criterion can be represented in the Haigh–Westergaard stress space as a convex smooth surface.

== Mathematical formulation ==
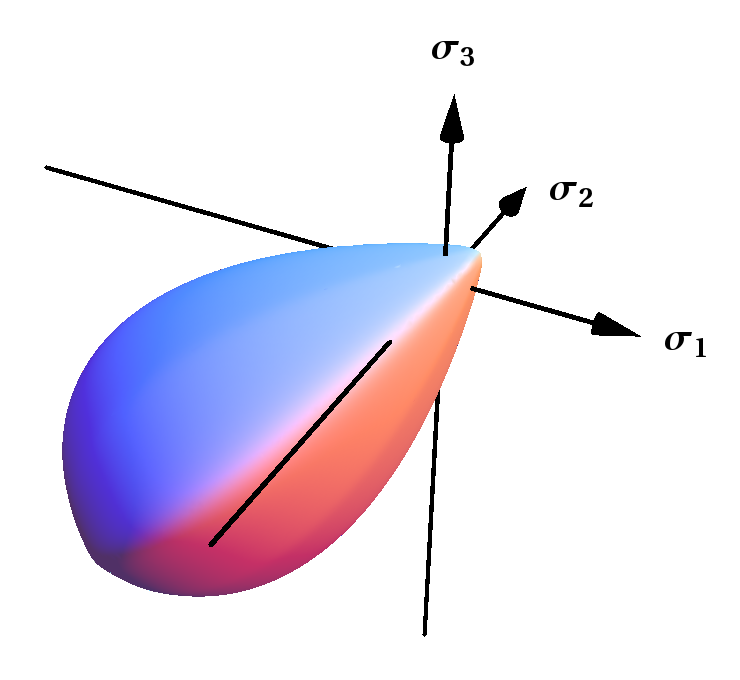
Bigoni-Piccolroaz yield surface in the 3D space of principal stresses

The Bigoni-Piccolroaz yield surface is thought as a direct interpolation of experimental data. This criterion represents a smooth and convex surface, which is closed both in hydrostatic tension and compression and has a drop-like shape, particularly suited to describe frictional and granular materials. This criterion has also been generalized to the case of surfaces with corners.

=== Design principles ===
Since the whole idea of the model is to tailor a function to experimental data, the authors have defined a certain group of features as desirable, even if not essential, among those:

- smoothness of the surface;
- possibility of changing the shape and thus the interpolation on a broad class of experimental data for different materials;
- possibility to represent known criteria with limit set of parameters;
- convexity of the surface.

=== Parametric function ===
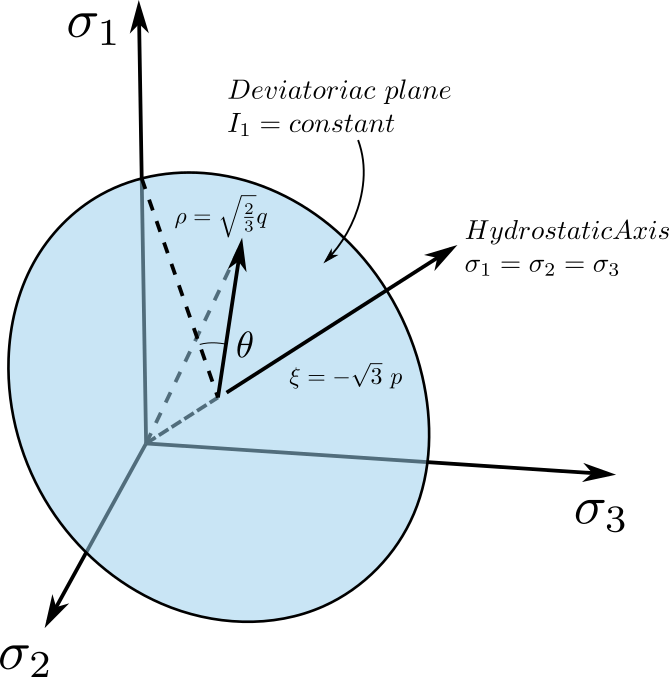
Representation of coordinates $p, q$ and $\theta$ of the BP yield surface in Haigh Westergaard stress space.

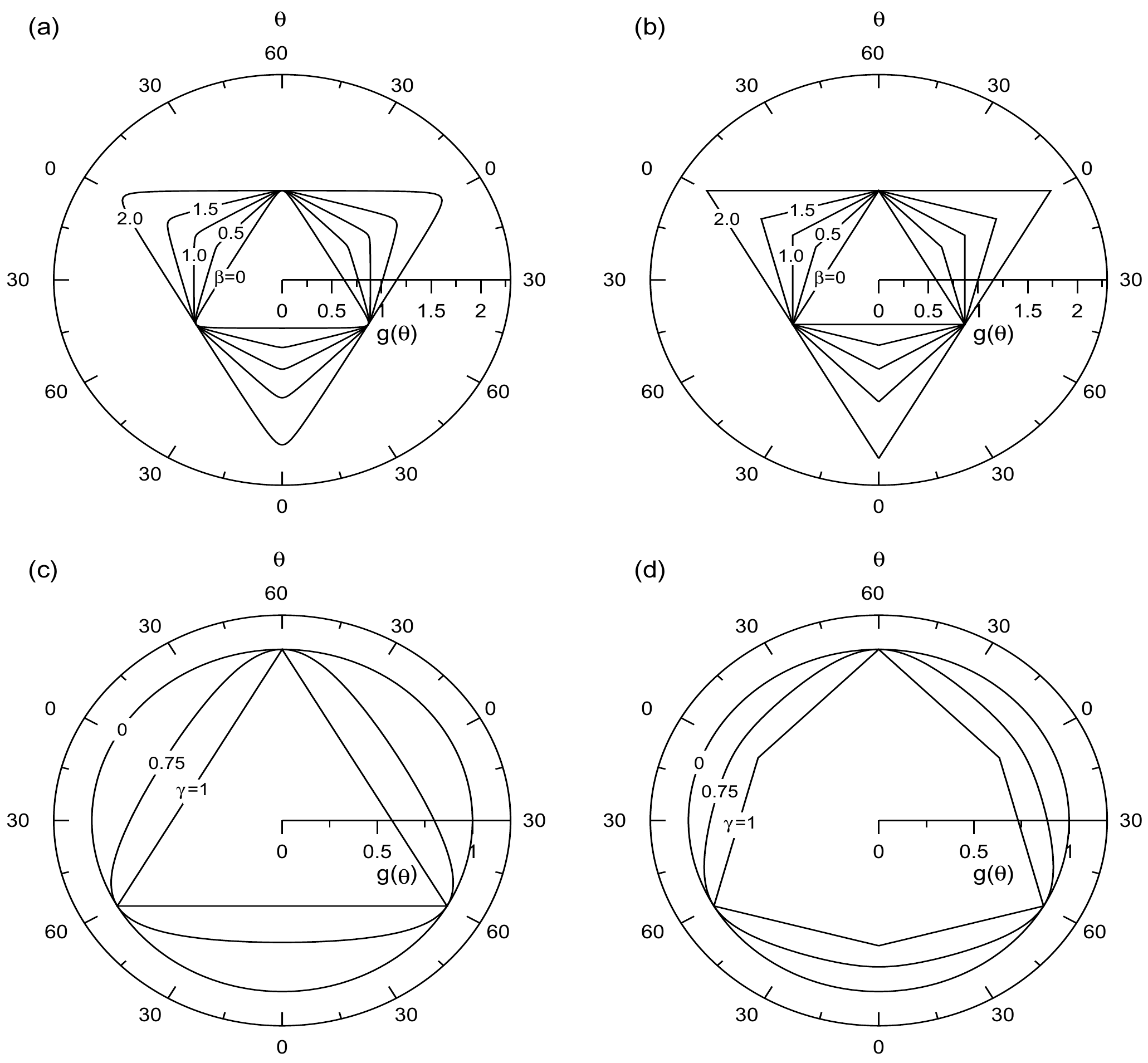
Deviatoric sections of a BP yield surface.

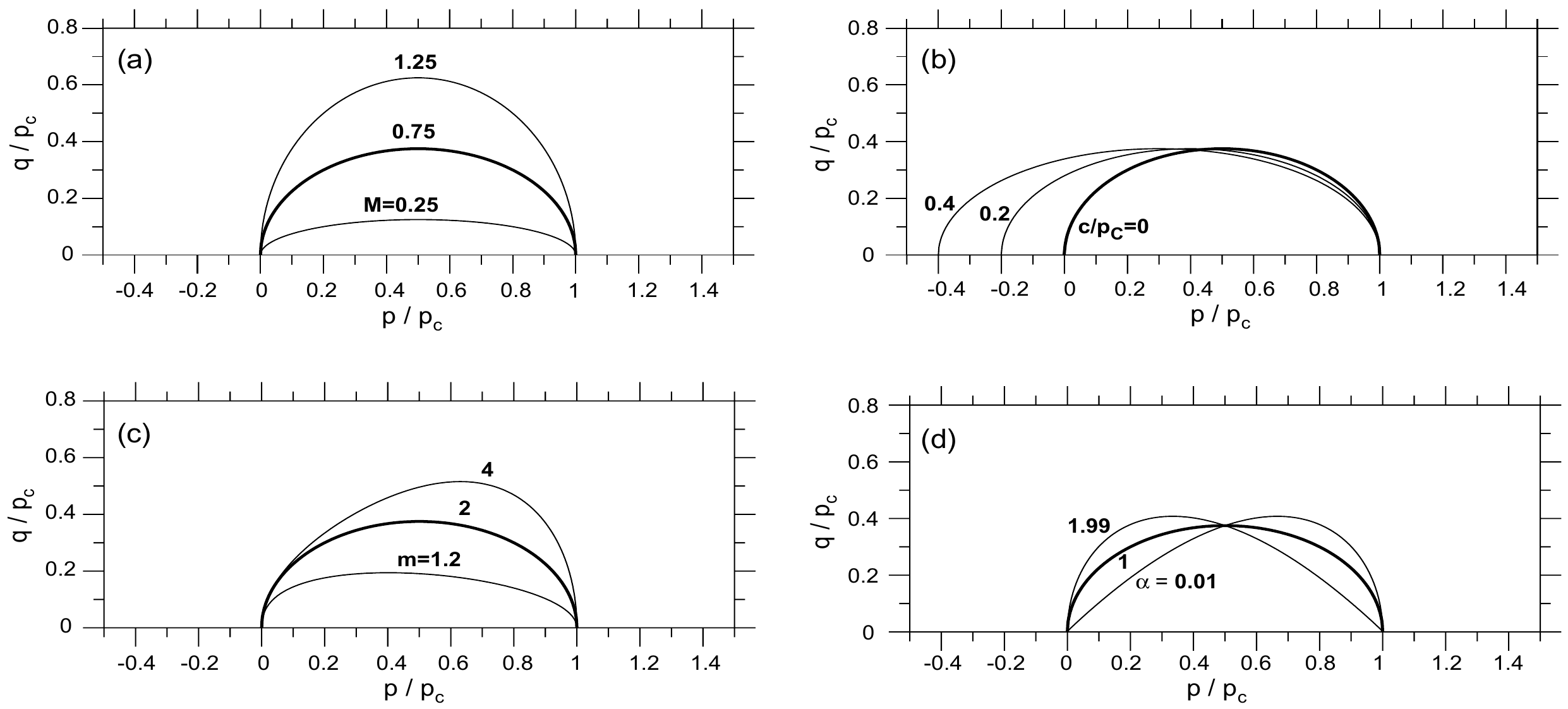
Meridian sections of a BP yield surface.

The Bigoni–Piccolroaz yield criterion is a seven-parameter surface defined as:

$$f(p,q,\theta) = F(p) + \frac{q}{g(\theta)} = 0,$$

where p, q and $\theta$ are invariants dependent on the stress tensor, while $F(p)$ is the "meridian" function:

$$F(p) =
\left\{
\begin{array}{ll}
-M p_c \sqrt{(\phi - \phi^m)[2(1 - \alpha)\phi + \alpha]}, & \phi \in [0,1], \\
+\infty, & \phi \notin [0,1],
\end{array}
\right.$$

$$\phi = \frac{p + c}{p_c + c},$$

describing the pressure-sensitivity and $g(\theta)$ is the "deviatoric" function:

$$g(\theta) = \frac{1}{\cos[\beta \frac{\pi}{6} - \frac{1}{3} \cos^{-1}(\gamma \cos 3\theta)]},$$

describing the Lode-dependence of yielding.

The mathematical definitions of the parameters $p, q$ and $\theta$ are:

$$p = -\frac{tr ~ \sigma  }{3}, \quad q = \sqrt{3\textit{J}_2}, \quad \theta = \frac{1}{3} cos^{-1} \left( \frac{3\sqrt{3}}{2} \frac{J_3}{J_2^{3/2}} \right)$$

With:

$$J_2 = \frac{1}{2} \textbf{S} \cdot \textbf{S}, \quad \textbf{S} = \sigma - \frac{tr \ \sigma}{3} \textbf{I}, \quad J_3 = \frac{1}{3} tr \ \textbf{S}^3$$

Where $\textbf{S}$ is the deviatoric stress, $\textbf{I}$ is the identity tensor, $\sigma$ is the stress tensor and the dot indicates the scalar product.

A better understanding of those important parameters can be grasped by using their geometrical representation in the Haigh–Westergaard stress space. Considering the tern of principal stresses and the deviatoric plane $\pi$, orthogonal to the trisector of the first quadrant and passing through the origin of the coordinate system, the tern $p, q$ and $\theta$ unequivocally represents a point in the space acting as a cylindrical coordinate system with the trisector as an axis:

- $- \sqrt{3} ~p$ is the distance of the point from the deviatoric plane $\pi$;
- $\sqrt{2/3}~ q$ is the distance from the trisector;
- $\theta$ represents the angle between the projections of $q$ and the axis $\sigma_1$ on the deviatoric plane $\pi$.

The usage of p and q instead of the correct cylindrical coordinates $\xi$ and $\rho$:

$$\xi = \frac{1}{\sqrt{3}} tr(\sigma)= - \sqrt{3} ~p, \quad \rho = \sqrt{2 ~ J_2} =\sqrt{\frac{2}{3}} q$$

is justified by the easier physical interpretation: p is the hydro-static pressure on the material point, q is the Von Mises equivalent stress.

The described yield function corresponds to the yield surface:

$$q = -f(p) g(\theta), \quad p \in [-c,p_c], \quad \theta \in [0,\pi/3]$$

which makes explicit the relation between the two functions $f(p)$ and $g(\theta)$ and the shape of the meridian and deviatoric sections, respectively.

The seven, non-negative material parameters:

$$\underbrace{M > 0,~ p_c > 0,~ c \geq 0,~ 0 < \alpha < 2,~ m > 1}_{\mbox{defining}~\displaystyle{F(p)}},~~~
\underbrace{0\leq \beta \leq 2,~ 0 \leq \gamma < 1}_{\mbox{defining}~\displaystyle{g(\theta)}},$$

define the shape of the meridian and deviatoric sections. In particular, some of the parameters are easily relatable to mechanical properties: $M$ controls the pressure sensitivity, $c$ and $p_c$ are the yield strength under isotropic conditions of tension and compression. The other parameters define the shape of the surface when intersected by the meridian and deviatoric planes: $\alpha$ and $m$ define the meridian section, $\beta$ and $\gamma$ define the deviatoric section.

== Related yielding criteria ==
Having been designed to allow consistent changes in the surface shape in the Haigh–Westergaard stress space, the Bigoni-Piccolroaz yield surface can be used as a generalized formulation for several criteria, such as the well known von Mises, Tresca, Mohr–Coulomb.

== See also ==
- Yield surface
- Yield (engineering)
- Plasticity (physics)
- Material failure theory
- Compaction of ceramic powders
