= Admiral Ellis =

Admiral Ellis may refer to:

- Abraham George Ellis (1846–1916), Royal Netherlands Navy vice admiral
- Edward Ellis (Royal Navy officer) (1918–2002), British Royal Navy rear admiral
- James O. Ellis (born 1947), U.S. Navy admiral
- William Edward Ellis (1908–1982), U.S. Navy vice admiral
