= Royal Naval College, Greenwich =

Royal Navy training establishment

Coordinates: 51°28′56″N 0°00′24″W

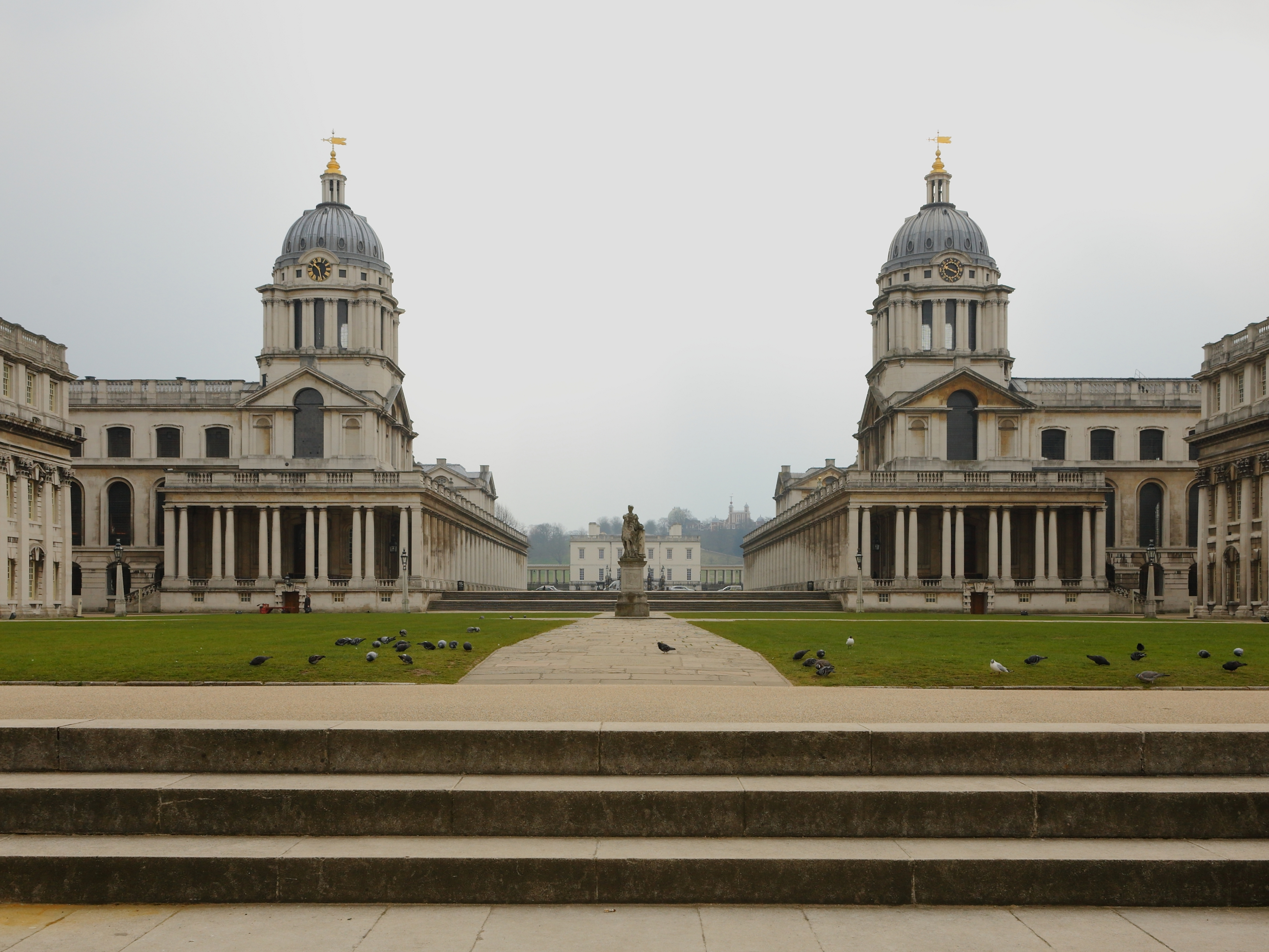
- Royal Naval College, Greenwich
- Active: 1873–1998
- Country: United Kingdom
- Branch: Royal Navy
- Type: Training
- Role: Higher officer training
- Garrison/HQ: Greenwich, London, United Kingdom
- Nickname: RNC
- Motto: Tam Minerva Quam Marte ("By Wisdom as much as by War")

The Royal Naval College, Greenwich, was a Royal Navy training establishment between 1873 and 1998, providing courses for naval officers. It was the home of the Royal Navy's staff college, which provided advanced training for officers. The equivalent in the British Army was the Staff College, Camberley, and the equivalent in the Royal Air Force was the RAF Staff College, Bracknell.

== History ==
The Royal Naval College, Greenwich, was founded by an Order in Council dated 16 January 1873, and replaced most of the functions previously carried out by the Royal Naval Academy at Portsmouth. The establishment of its officers consisted of a president, who was always a flag officer; a captain, Royal Navy; a director of studies; and professors of mathematics, physical science, chemistry, applied mechanics, and fortification. It was to take in officers who were already sub-lieutenants and to operate as "the university of the Navy". The director of studies, a civilian, was in charge of an academic board, while the captain of the college was a naval officer who acted as chief of staff.

The Royal Naval War College, which had been established at Greenwich in November 1900 before being removed to first Devonport and then Portsmouth, transferred its activities to the college at Greenwich in 1914. During World War I the Royal Naval College was requisitioned as a barracks and for scientific experiments. The training of officers was not resumed until 1919.

On 30 October 1939 the college began to train officers of the Women's Royal Naval Service. During the Second World War, the college increased the number of officers of both sexes trained for an expanded Navy. Its major task was the training of fighting officers, and around 35,000 men and women graduated during that period. In 1943, the beautiful Admiral's House on the north wing of King Charles Court was damaged by a direct hit from a German bomb; another bomb hit the front of the building.

The Navy's Department of Nuclear Science and Technology opened on the college premises in 1959, and JASON, the department's research and training reactor, was commissioned in the King William building in 1962.

In 1967 Queen Elizabeth II knighted Francis Chichester on the river steps of the college, honouring his achievement in circumnavigating the world as a solo yachtsman, using the old route of the clippers, becoming the first to do so. His was also the fastest such circumnavigation, taking nine months and one day.

The Royal School of Naval Architecture, which had been part of the college since 1873, transferred to University College London in 1967. The Royal Naval College continued to train women until 1976, when their courses were transferred to the Britannia Royal Naval College.

From 1983 the relocated Joint Services Defence College also occupied much of the King Charles building. With a shrinking Royal Navy, the decision was taken to close RNC Greenwich in 1998. All initial officer training is now carried out at the Britannia Royal Naval College, and the new Joint Services Command and Staff College, created in 1997, took over the staff college functions.

== Buildings ==
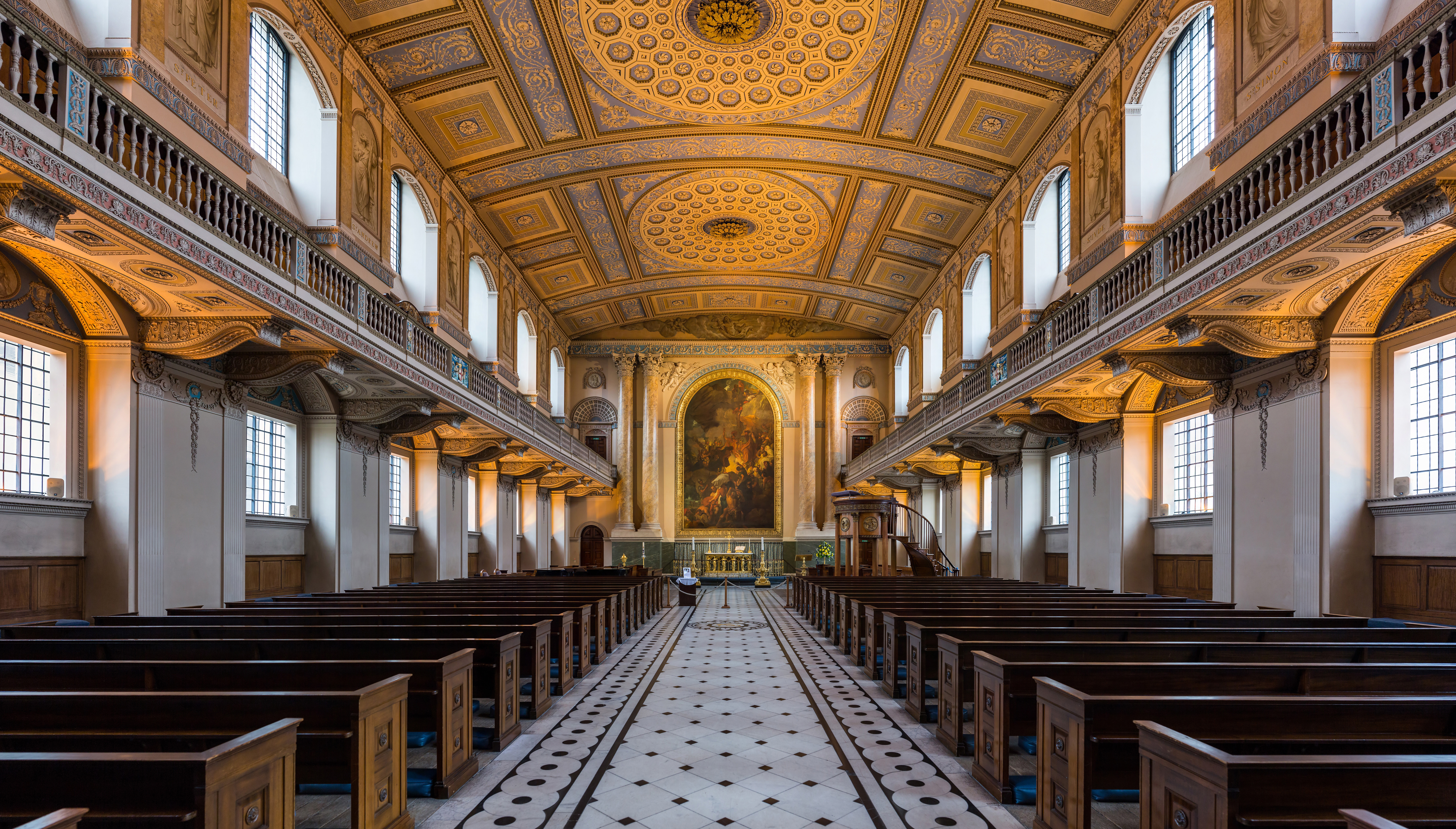
The former chapel of the Royal Naval College

The college was established in buildings designed by Sir Christopher Wren and built between 1696 and 1712, then intended to serve as the Greenwich Hospital, a home for disabled sailors. This closed in 1869, when the pensioners were transferred to other places, leaving the buildings available for a new use. The site of the former hospital had once been occupied by the medieval Palace of Placentia, or "Palace at Greenwich", begun by Humphrey, Duke of Gloucester, in 1428.

After the Royal Navy departed in 1998 the buildings were opened to the public as the Old Royal Naval College.

== Presidents ==
See also Category:Admiral presidents of the Royal Naval College, Greenwich

The president of the college was a full-time post until 1982 when it became an honorary role held by the Second Sea Lord (and from 1994 an honorary role held by the Assistant Chief of the Naval Staff). Presidents included:

- Vice-Admiral Sir Astley Cooper Key (1873–1875)
- Admiral Sir Edward Gennys Fanshawe (1875–1878)
- Admiral Sir Charles Frederick Alexander Shadwell (1878–1881)
- Admiral Sir Geoffrey Phipps Hornby (1881–1882)
- Admiral William Garnham Luard (1882–1885)
- Vice-Admiral Sir Thomas Brandreth (1885–1888)
- Admiral Sir William Graham (1888–1891)
- Admiral Sir Richard Vesey Hamilton (1891–1894)
- Admiral Sir Walter James Hunt-Grubbe (1894–1897)
- Admiral Sir Richard Tracey (1897–1900)
- Admiral Sir Robert More-Molyneux (1900–1903)
- Admiral Sir Robert Hastings Penruddock Harris (1903–1906)
- Admiral Sir Arthur Dalrymple Fanshawe (1906–1908)
- Admiral Sir John Durnford (1908–1911)
- Admiral Sir Frederic William Fisher (1911–1914)
- Vice-Admiral The Hon. Sir Alexander Edward Bethell (1914–1915)
- Vice-Admiral Sir Lewis Bayly (1915–1916)
- Admiral Sir Henry Bradwardine Jackson (1916–1919)
- Vice-Admiral Sir William Christopher Pakenham (1919–1920)
- Vice-Admiral Sir Frederick Tudor (1920–1922)
- Rear-Admiral Herbert Richmond (1922–1923)
- Admiral Sir George Hope (1923–1926)
- Admiral Sir Richard Webb (1926–1929)
- Vice-Admiral John McClintock (1929)
- Vice-Admiral Sir William Henry Dudley Boyle (1929–1932)
- Vice-Admiral Sir Barry Domvile (1932–1934)
- Vice-Admiral Sir Ragnar Colvin (1934–1937)
- Vice-Admiral Sir Sidney Bailey (1937–1938)
- Vice-Admiral Sir Charles Kennedy-Purvis (1938–1940)
- Vacant (1940–1943)
- Commodore Augustus Agar (1943–1946)
- Vice-Admiral Sir Patrick Brind (1946–1948)
- Vice-Admiral Geoffrey Oliver (1948–1950)
- Admiral Sir Harold Kinahan (1950–1952)
- Vice-Admiral Sir Aubrey Mansergh (1952–1954)
- Admiral Sir William Andrewes (1954–1956)
- Vice-Admiral Sir Geoffrey Barnard (1956–1958)
- Rear-Admiral David Cairns, 5th Earl Cairns (1958–1961)
- Rear-Admiral Sir Alexander Gordon-Lennox (1961–1962)
- Rear-Admiral Morgan Morgan-Giles (1962–1964)
- Vice-Admiral Sir Ian Lachlan Mackay McGeoch (1964–1965)
- Rear-Admiral Patrick Bayly (1965–1967)
- Vice-Admiral Sir Horace Lyddon (1967–1968)
- Rear-Admiral Edward Gueritz (1968–1970)
- Rear-Admiral Martin Noel Lucey (1970–1972)
- Rear-Admiral Edward William Ellis (1972–1974)
- Rear-Admiral Derek Willoughby Bazalgette (1974–1976)
- Rear-Admiral Charles Weston (1976–1978)
- Rear-Admiral Anthony John Cooke (1978–1980)
- Rear-Admiral John Hildred Carlill (1980–1982)
- Admiral Sir Simon Cassels (1982–1986)
- Admiral Sir Richard George Alison Fitch (1986–1988)
- Admiral Sir Brian Brown (1988–1991)
- Admiral Sir Michael Livesay (1991–1993)
- Admiral Sir Michael Henry Gordon Layard (1993–1994)
- Admiral Sir John Richard Brigstocke (1994–1995)
- Vice-Admiral Sir Jeremy Joe Blackham (1995–1997)

== Directors of Studies ==
The following individuals served as Director of Studies:

Order	Officeholder	Title	Term began	Term end	Time in office	Notes
1	Thomas Archer Hirst	Director of Studies	1873	1882	8–9 years	
2	Sir William Davidson Niven	Director of Studies	1882	1903	20–21 years	
3	Captain William Harold Watts RN	Director of Studies	1966	1969	2–3 years	

== Notable professors ==
- William Burnside, Professor of Mathematics (1885–1919)
- Bernard Parker Haigh, Professor of applied mechanics, known for the Haigh diagram (appointed 1913)
- John Knox Laughton, Head of Department of Meteorology and Marine Surveying (1873–1885)
- Christopher Lloyd, Professor of History (1962–1967)
- Peter Stanley Lyons, Director of Music (1950–1954)
- Bryan Ranft, Professor of History and International Affairs (1967–1977)
- Arnold William Reinold, Professor of Physics (1873–1908)

== Notable students ==
- Commodore Augustus Agar VC (1890–1968)
- Admiral of the Fleet David Beatty, 1st Earl Beatty (1871–1936)
- George Richard Bethell (1849–1919), Royal Navy officer and Conservative politician
- Admiral Hugo Biermann (1916–2012), Chief of the South African Navy and the South African Defence Force
- Basil Charles Barrington Brooke (1895–1983), admiral and first-class cricketer
- Sir Henry Harvey Bruce (1862–1948), admiral
- Admiral of the Fleet Lord Cunningham of Hyndhope (1883–1963)
- Vice Admiral A. H. Asoka de Silva (1931–2006), Commander of the Navy of Sri Lanka from 1983 to 1986
- Vice Admiral Henry George DeWolf (1903–2000), Canadian naval officer
- Admiral Sir Frederic Charles Dreyer (1878–1956)
- Admiral of the Fleet Prince Philip, Duke of Edinburgh (1921–2021)
- Admiral Sir William Wordsworth Fisher (1875–1937)
- Prince Charles, Count of Flanders, Prince-Regent of Belgium
- Rear Admiral Musharraf Hussain Khan (1932–2018), Chief of Bangladesh Navy Staff from 1973 to 1979
- Admiral D. Basil Gunasekara (born 1929), Commander of the Sri Lankan Navy from 1973 to 1979
- Admiral Henry Perera, Commander of the Sri Lankan Navy from 1979 to 1983
- Hugh Alfred Vernon Haggard (1908–1991), Royal Navy submariner
- Admiral of the Fleet Lord Hill-Norton (1915–2004)
- Vice Admiral Sir J. G. T. Inglis (1906–1972), Head of Naval Intelligence
- Prince Abhakara Kiartivongse (1880–1923), of the Siamese royal family, a founder of modern Royal Thai Navy
- Admiral of the Fleet Lord Lewin (1920–1999)
- Rear-Admiral Simon Robert Lister (born 1959), Royal Navy officer, now Director, Submarines
- Dudley Leigh Aman, 1st Baron Marley (1884–1952), soldier and Labour politician
- Rear Admiral Sir David Martin (1933–1990), Royal Australian Navy officer and Governor of New South Wales
- Vice Admiral Mark Mellett, Chief of Staff of the Irish Defence Forces
- Admiral of the Fleet Earl Mountbatten of Burma (1900–1979), last Viceroy of India, First Sea Lord, Chief of the Defence Staff
- Lieutenant-General Arthur Ernest Percival (1887–1966)
- Marshal of the Royal Air Force Charles Portal, 1st Viscount Portal of Hungerford (1893–1971), Chief of the Air Staff
- Admiral Sa Zhenbing (1859–1952), Premier of the Republic of China, Chief of the Republic of China Navy
- Prince Arisugawa Takehito (1862–1913), of the Japanese imperial family, a career officer in the Imperial Japanese Navy
- Rear Admiral David Watson Taylor (1864–1940), naval architect and engineer of the United States Navy
- Admiral of the Fleet Tōgō Heihachirō (1848–1934), Imperial Japanese Navy
- Admiral of the Fleet Lord Tovey (1885–1971)
- Sir Patrick Wall (1916–1998), Royal Marines commando and Conservative politician
- Josiah Wedgwood, 1st Baron Wedgwood (1872–1943), Liberal and later Labour politician

== Since decommissioning ==
Now known as the Old Royal Naval College, the college's former buildings are open to the public and are the home of three attractions; the Painted Hall, the chapel, and the Discover Greenwich visitor centre. The site has also been used as a film location, appearing in Sherlock Holmes (2009) and The Foreigner (2017) and as the setting for the final clash on Earth in Thor: The Dark World.

== See also ==
- Britannia Royal Naval College
- Royal Naval College of Canada
- Royal Canadian Naval College
- Royal Australian Naval College
