= John Carlill =

Royal Navy Rear-Admiral (1925–2015)

Rear-Admiral John Carlill OBE DL
- Born: 24 October 1925
- Died: 10 November 2015 (aged 90)
- Military career
- Allegiance: United Kingdom
- Branch: Royal Navy
- Service years: 1939–1982
- Rank: Rear Admiral
- Commands: Royal Naval College, Greenwich
- Conflicts: World War II
- Awards: Officer of the Order of the British Empire

Rear-Admiral John Hildred Carlill, OBE, DL (24 October 1925 – 10 November 2015) was a Royal Navy officer who became President of the Royal Naval College, Greenwich.

== Naval career ==
Educated at the Royal Naval College, Dartmouth, Carlill joined the Royal Navy in 1939 and served in World War II in the cruiser HMS Mauritius. He became Secretary to the Flag Officer Naval Air Command, Director of Naval Manning and Training at the Ministry of Defence and then Secretary to the Second Sea Lord. He went on to be President of the Admiralty Inverview Board before becoming Commodore commanding the shore establishment HMS Drake in 1977. Promoted to rear-admiral on 7 July 1980, he became Admiral President of the Royal Naval College, Greenwich in 1980 before retiring in December 1982.

In retirement he became Secretary of the Engineering Council. He died on 10 November 2015.

Military offices
Preceded by Anthony Cooke	President, Royal Naval College, Greenwich; 1980–1982	Succeeded by Became an honorary role held by the Second Sea Lord
