= Anthony Cooke (Royal Navy officer) =

Royal Navy Rear-Admiral (1927–2019)

Rear-Admiral Anthony Cooke CB
- Born: 21 September 1927
- Died: 1 December 2019 (aged 92)
- Military career
- Allegiance: United Kingdom
- Branch: Royal Navy
- Service years: 1945-1980
- Rank: Rear-Admiral
- Commands: Royal Naval College, Greenwich
- Awards: Companion of the Order of the Bath

Rear-Admiral Anthony John Cooke CB (21 September 1927 – 1 December 2019) was a Royal Navy officer who became President of the Royal Naval College, Greenwich.

== Naval career ==
Educated at the St Edward's School, Oxford, Cooke joined the Royal Navy in 1945. He became Commodore in command of HMNB Clyde in 1973, Senior Naval Member on the staff of the Royal College of Defence Studies in 1975 and President of the Royal Naval College, Greenwich in 1978 before retiring in 1980.

He was promoted to the substantive rank of rear admiral on 7 January 1976, having previously held acting rank. He was appointed a Companion of the Order of the Bath (CB) in the 1980 Birthday Honours.

In retirement he became Private Secretary to the Lord Mayor of London.

He died on 1 December 2019 at the age of 92.

Military offices
Preceded by Charles Weston	President, Royal Naval College, Greenwich; 1978–1980	Succeeded by John Carlill
