= Stress space =

Mathematical representation of stress in continuum dynamics

Visualisation of a Cauchy stress tensor σ in the Haight-Westergaard stress space

In continuum mechanics, Haigh–Westergaard stress space, or simply stress space is a 3-dimensional space in which the three spatial axes represent the three principal stresses of a body subject to stress. This space is named after Bernard Haigh and Harold M. Westergaard.

In mathematical terms, H-W space can also be interpreted (understood) as a set of numerical markers of stress tensors orbits (with respect to proper rotations group – special orthogonal group SO3); every point of H-W space represents one orbit.

Functions of the principal stresses, such as the yield function, can be represented by surfaces in 'stress space. In particular, the surface represented by von Mises yield function is a right circular cylinder, equiaxial to each of the three stress axes.

In 2-dimensional models, stress space reduces to a plane and the von Mises yield surface reduces to an ellipse.

== See also ==
- Bigoni–Piccolroaz yield criterion
