= Charles Weston (Royal Navy officer) =

Royal Navy Rear-Admiral (1922–1998)

Rear-Admiral Charles Weston CB
- Born: 12 July 1922
- Died: 27 March 1998 (aged 75)
- Military career
- Allegiance: United Kingdom
- Branch: Royal Navy
- Service years: 1940–1978
- Rank: Rear-Admiral
- Commands: Royal Naval College, Greenwich
- Conflicts: World War II
- Awards: Companion of the Order of the Bath

Rear-Admiral Charles Arthur Winfield Weston CB (12 July 1922 – 27 March 1998) was a Royal Navy officer who became President of the Royal Naval College, Greenwich.

== Naval career ==
Educated at the Merchant Taylors' School, Weston joined the Royal Navy in 1940 and served in World War II. He became Secretary to the Second Sea Lord in 1965, Chief of Staff to the Commander-in-Chief Naval Home Command in 1969 and Director of Naval Physical Training and Sport in 1972. He went on to be Director of the Defence Administration Planning Staff in 1973, Director of Royal Naval Quartering in 1975 and President of the Royal Naval College, Greenwich in 1976 before retiring in 1978. He was appointed CB in June 1978.

In retirement he became Appeals Secretary for the King Edward VII's Hospital for Officers. He died on 27 March 1998, at the age of 76.

Military offices
Preceded by Derek Bazalgette	President, Royal Naval College, Greenwich; 1976–1978	Succeeded by Anthony Cooke
