= Harold Kinahan =

Royal Navy Admiral (1893–1980)

Admiral Sir Harold Kinahan KBE CB
- Born: 4 June 1893; Belfast, Northern Ireland
- Died: 22 March 1980 (aged 86); Almondsbury, South Gloucestershire, England
- Military career
- Allegiance: United Kingdom
- Branch: Royal Navy
- Service years: 1906-1952
- Rank: Admiral
- Commands: HMS Orion; HMS Anson; 1st Cruiser Squadron of the Mediterranean Fleet; Royal Naval College, Greenwich
- Conflicts: World War I World War II
- Awards: Knight Commander of the Order of the British Empire; Companion of the Order of the Bath

Admiral Sir Harold Richard George Kinahan, KBE, CB (4 June 1893 – 22 March 1980) was a Royal Navy officer who became President of the Royal Naval College, Greenwich.

== Naval career ==
Kinahan joined the Royal Navy as a cadet at the Royal Naval College, Osborne, in 1906. He served in World War I seeing action during the Gallipoli Campaign and later specialising in gunnery. He became Assistant and later deputy director of Navigation and Direction at the Admiralty in 1934 and then Commanding Officer of the cruiser HMS Orion in 1937. He served in World War II on the staff of the Commander-in-Chief Home Fleet from 1940, commanded the battleship HMS Anson from 1942 and then became Director of Personal Services at the Admiralty from 1943. He went on to be Flag Officer commanding the 1st Cruiser Squadron of the Mediterranean Fleet in 1946, Vice President and Senior Naval Member on the Ordnance Board in 1947 and President of the Ordnance Board in 1949. His last appointment was as President of the Royal Naval College, Greenwich in 1950 before retiring in 1952.

Military offices
| Preceded by Sir Geoffrey Oliver | President, Royal Naval College, Greenwich; 1950–1952 | Succeeded by Sir Aubrey Mansergh |
