= HMS Aurora (F10) =

1964 Type 12I or Leander-class frigate of the Royal Navy

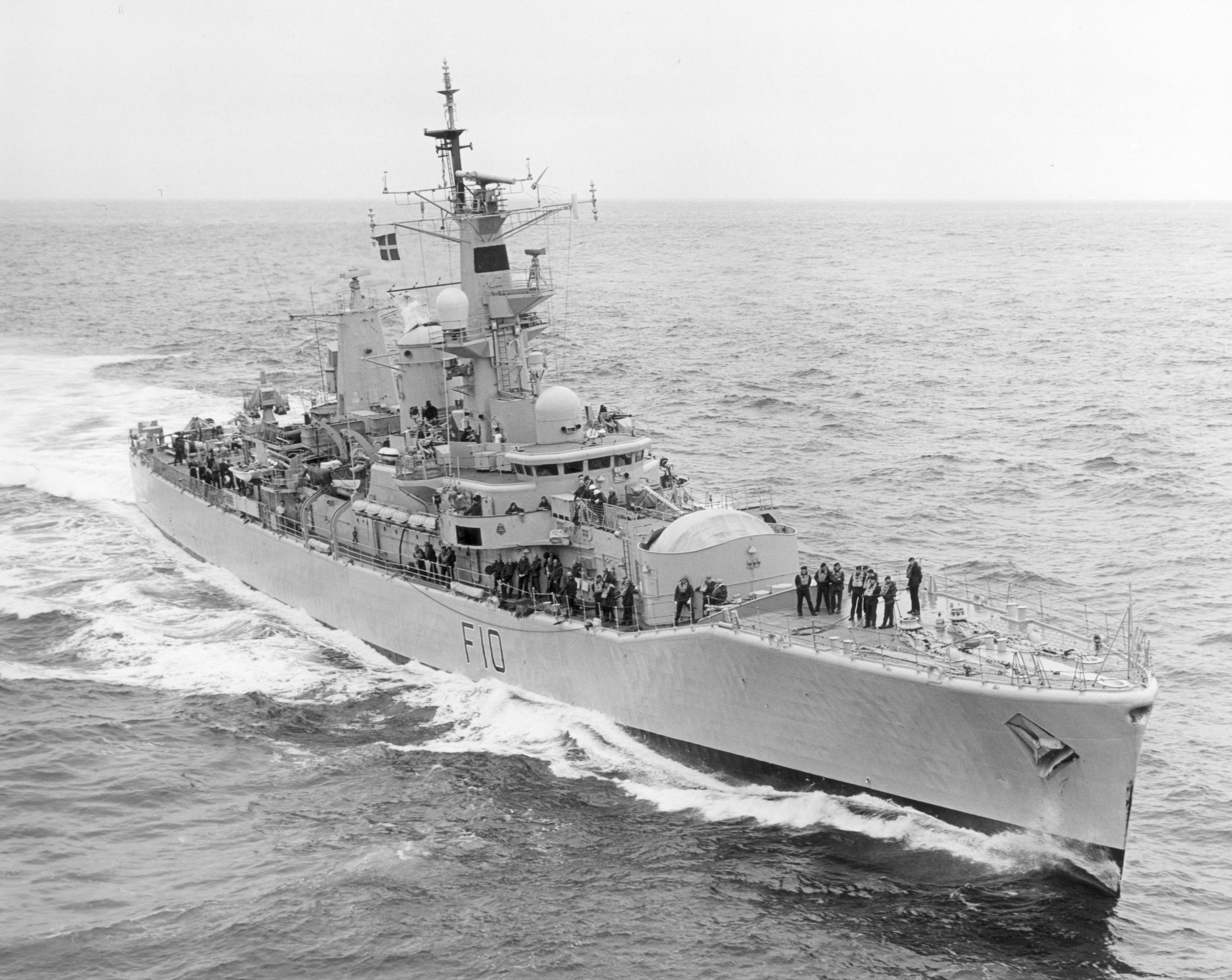
- Aurora post IKARA conversion

History

United Kingdom
- Name: Aurora
- Builder: John Brown & Company
- Cost: £4.65m
- Yard number: 721
- Laid down: 1 June 1961
- Launched: 28 November 1962
- Commissioned: 9 April 1964
- Recommissioned: 5 August 1967
- Decommissioned: 28 April 1987
- Refit: Converted to IKARA Batch 1b Leander 4 December 1974 – 27 February 1976 – Chatham Dockyard. Conversion cost £15.58m
- Home port: Chatham
- Identification: Pennant number: F10
- Motto: Post Tenebras Lux: 'After darkness light'
- Fate: Arrived for scrapping 6 September 1990 at Millom, Cumbria

General characteristics
- Class & type: Leander-class frigate
- Displacement: 2,500 tons standard, 2,962 tons full load
- Length: 113.4 m (372 ft 1 in)
- Beam: 13.1 m (43 ft 0 in)
- Draught: 4.5 m (14 ft 9 in)
- Propulsion: 2 Babcock & Wilcox oil-fired boilers, geared steam turbines, 22,370 kilowatts (30,000 hp), 2 shafts
- Speed: 27 knots (50 km/h; 31 mph)
- Range: 7,400 kilometres (4,600 mi; 4,000 nmi) at 15 knots (28 km/h; 17 mph)
- Complement: 260
- Sensors & processing systems: Radar: Types 965 (air warning radar removed in batch 1 ships), 992Q, 903, 974/978; Sonar: Types 162, 184, 199
- Armament: Initial: 2 × 4.5-inch guns (1 × twin mounting Mk6); 1 × Seacat surface-to-air missile launcher; 2 × 20 mm guns (single mountings); 1 × ASW Limbo mortar; Batch 1: 1 × Ikara Anti submarine missile launcher; 2 × Seacat surface-to-air missile launchers; 2 × 40 mm guns - single mountings; 2 × triple 324 mm (12.75 in) STWS-1 tubes for Mk 46 and Stingray ASW torpedoes; 1 × Limbo ASW Mortar
- Aircraft carried: Initial and Batch 1: 1 × Westland Wasp ASW helicopter.

HMS Aurora was a Leander-class frigate of the Royal Navy (RN). Like other ships of the class, Aurora was named after a figure of mythology, Aurora being the Roman equivalent of the Greek goddess Eos.

== History ==
Aurora was built by John Brown & Company, shipbuilders of Clydebank, Scotland. Aurora was launched on 28 November 1962 and commissioned on 9 April 1964.

Aurora became the leader of the 2nd Frigate Squadron in 1964. From 1967 to 1968, Derek Bazalgette served her as Commanding Officer. On 17 April 1968, her Westland Wasp ASW helicopter from 829 Naval Air Squadron crashed off South Africa. It was replaced by an aircraft from HMS Gurkha.

In August 1969, Aurora, together with the American destroyer Macdonough and the French destroyer La Galissonnière, took part in the commemorations at Théoule-sur-Mer of the 25th anniversary of Operation Dragoon, the Allied invasion of Southern France. From 1970 to 1971, Paul Greening served as her Commanding Officer.

On 19 September 1972, while on patrol near the Faroe Islands during the Second Cod War, Aurora came to the aid of the Icelandic fishing vessel Jon Eiriksson that had caught fire, rescuing the five-person crew of the fishing vessel with the frigate's helicopter. Soon after this incident, Aurora underwent modernisation which included the addition of the Ikara anti-submarine warfare (ASW) missile launcher that in effect changed the Batch One ships, of which Aurora was part, into a specialised ASW batch rather than its original role as a general-purpose batch. The modernisation was completed in 1976.

In 1978, Aurora joined the Fishery Protection Squadron, undertaking patrols and other duties in support of British fishing interests around the UK. She remained with the squadron until she was eventually transferred to the 7th Frigate Squadron, which was stationed in the Far East, just as the RN presence in that region was being reduced.

Further duties were undertaken by Aurora across the world and in 1982 she took part in the Armilla Patrol and in 1983 was deployed to the Far East, Australia and New Zealand during the Royal Navy's 'Orient Express' deployment along with HMS Invincible, HMS Rothsay and other RN Ships.

However, in 1987, due to defence cuts, as well as manpower shortages, a common problem for the RN at that time, Aurora was decommissioned.

== Publications ==
- Colledge, J. J.; Warlow, Ben (2006) [1969]. Ships of the Royal Navy: The Complete Record of All Fighting Ships of the Royal Navy from the 15th Century to the Present (3rd Rev ed.). London: Chatham Publishing. ISBN 978-1-86176-281-8. OCLC 67375475.
- Marriott, Leo, 1983. Royal Navy Frigates 1945-1983, Ian Allan Ltd. ISBN 07110 1322 5
