= Aubrey Mansergh =

Royal Navy Vice Admiral (1898–1990)

Vice-Admiral Sir Aubrey Mansergh KBE CB DSC
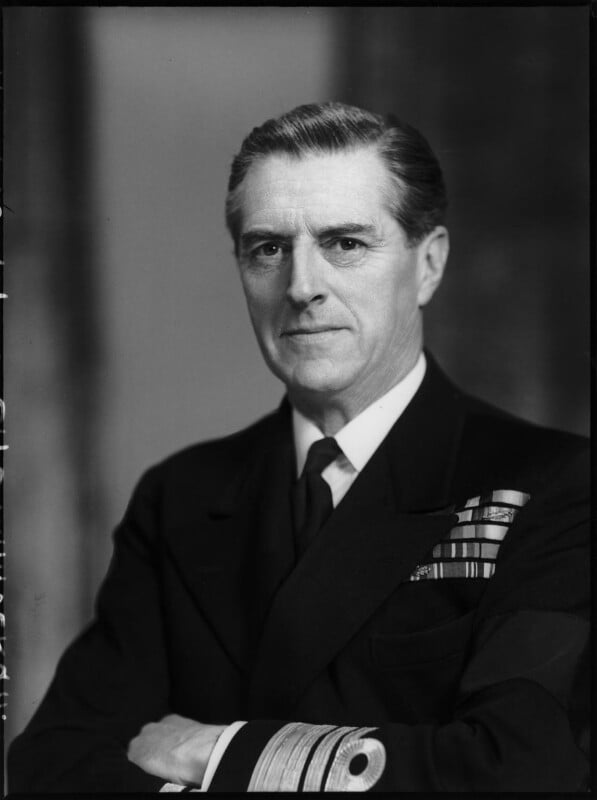
- Mansergh in 1952
- Born: 7 October 1898; Brentford, Middlesex
- Died: 31 July 1990 (aged 91); Rottingdean, East Sussex
- Military career
- Allegiance: United Kingdom
- Branch: Royal Navy
- Service years: 1911-1956
- Rank: Vice-Admiral
- Commands: HMS Cairo; HMS Aurora; HMNZS Achilles; HMNZS Leander; HMS Implacable; 2nd Cruiser Squadron; Royal Naval College, Greenwich
- Conflicts: World War I World War II
- Awards: Knight Commander of the Order of the British Empire; Companion of the Order of the Bath; Distinguished Service Cross

Vice Admiral Sir Cecil Aubrey Lawson Mansergh KBE, CB, DSC (7 October 1898 – 31 July 1990) was a Royal Navy officer who became President of the Royal Naval College, Greenwich.

== Naval career ==
Born the son of Ernest Lawson Mansergh and younger brother of Admiral Sir Maurice Mansergh, Mansergh joined the Royal Navy in 1911 and then served in World War I. He became Commanding Officer of the cruiser HMS Cairo in 1936 and Commanding Officer of the cruiser HMS Aurora in 1937 and then Staff Officer (Plans) on the staff of the Commander-in-Chief, Home Fleet in 1939.

Mansergh also served in World War II commanding the cruiser HMNZS Achilles from 1942 and then commanding the cruiser HMNZS Leander from 1943 before becoming a Commodore on the staff of the Admiralty. He went on to be Commanding Officer of the aircraft carrier HMS Implacable in 1946, Vice-Controller of the Navy and Director of Naval Equipment in 1948 and Commander of the 2nd Cruiser Squadron in 1950. His last appointment was as President of the Royal Naval College, Greenwich in 1952 before retiring in 1956. He died in 1990 and is buried at St Margaret's Churchyard at Rottingdean in East Sussex.

Military offices
Preceded by Sir Harold Kinahan	President, Royal Naval College, Greenwich; 1952–1954	Succeeded by Sir William Andrewes
