= Derek Bazalgette =

Royal Navy Rear-Admiral (1924–2007)

Rear-Admiral Derek Bazalgette CB
- Born: 22 July 1924
- Died: 22 July 2007 (aged 83)
- Military career
- Allegiance: United Kingdom
- Branch: Royal Navy
- Service years: 1938-1976
- Rank: Rear-Admiral
- Commands: HMS Aurora; HMS Bulwark; Royal Naval College, Greenwich
- Conflicts: World War II
- Awards: Companion of the Order of the Bath

Rear-Admiral Derek Willoughby Bazalgette CB (22 July 1924 – 22 July 2007) was a Royal Navy officer who became President of the Royal Naval College, Greenwich.

== Naval career ==
Educated at the Royal Naval College, Dartmouth, Bazalgette joined the Royal Navy in 1938 and served in World War II with the Arctic convoys. While serving as Second-in-Command of the aircraft carrier HMS Centaur in 1964, he assisted in an operation to deploy 45 Commando in Dar es Salaam where the 1st Battalion Tanganyika Rifles had staged a mutiny. He became Director of Naval Operations at the Ministry of Defence in 1965, Commanding Officer of the frigate HMS Aurora in 1967 and Chief of Staff to the Commander British Forces in Hong Kong in 1970. He went on to be Commanding Officer of the commando carrier HMS Bulwark in 1972 and President of the Royal Naval College, Greenwich in 1974. He was promoted rear admiral on 7 July 1974, before retiring in 1976. He died in July 2007.

Military offices
Preceded by Edward Ellis	President, Royal Naval College, Greenwich; 1974–1976	Succeeded by Charles Weston
