= Tresca =

Tresca is a surname. Notable people with the surname include:

- Carlo Tresca (1879–1943), Italian-born American anarchist
- Henri Tresca (1814–1885), French mechanical engineer
