= HMS Hermione (74) =

Cruiser of the Royal Navy

Coordinates: 33°20′N 26°00′E

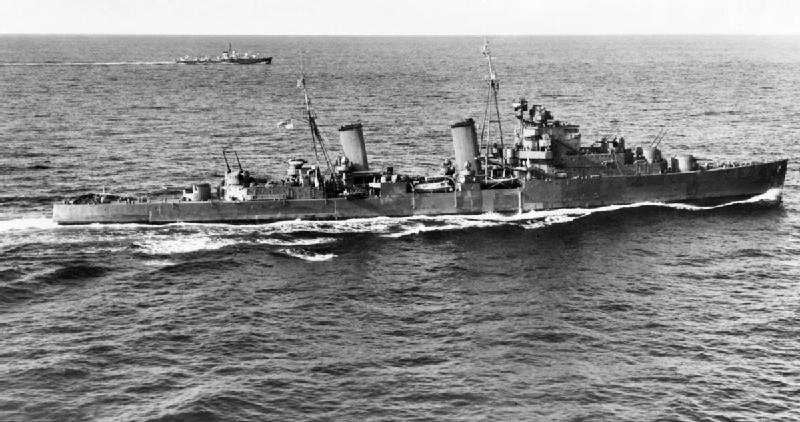
- Aerial photograph of Hermione at sea, January 1942

History

United Kingdom
- Name: Hermione
- Builder: Alexander Stephen and Sons Glasgow
- Laid down: 6 October 1937
- Launched: 18 May 1939
- Commissioned: 25 March 1941
- Identification: Pennant number 74
- Fate: Sunk 16 June 1942

General characteristics
- Class & type: Dido-class light cruiser
- Displacement: 5,600 tons standard; 6,850 tons full load
- Length: 485 ft (148 m) pp; 512 ft (156 m) oa
- Beam: 50.5 ft (15.4 m)
- Draught: 14 ft (4.3 m)
- Propulsion: Parsons geared turbines; Four shafts; Four Admiralty 3-drum boilers; 62,000 shp (46,000 kW)
- Speed: 32.25 knots (60 km/h)
- Range: 1,500 nmi (2,800 km; 1,700 mi) at 30 kn (56 km/h; 35 mph); 4,240 nmi (7,850 km; 4,880 mi) at 16 kn (30 km/h; 18 mph)
- Complement: 480
- Armament: 10 × QF 5.25-inch (133 mm) guns; 2 × 0.5 in MG quadruple guns, 2 × 2-pounder 40 mm pom-pom quad guns, 2 × 21 inch (533 mm) triple torpedo tubes.
- Armour: Belt: 3 in (76 mm); Deck: 1 in (25 mm); Magazines: 2 in (51 mm); Bulkheads: 1 in (25 mm)

HMS Hermione was a Dido-class light cruiser of the Royal Navy. She was built by Alexander Stephen and Sons (Glasgow, Scotland), with the keel laid down on 6 October 1937. She was launched on 18 May 1939 and commissioned 25 March 1941. On 16 June 1942, Hermione was torpedoed and sunk by the German submarine U-205 in the Mediterranean. Eighty-eight crewmembers were killed.

== Construction and design ==
The Dido-class were designed as small cruisers capable of being built quickly and in large numbers to allow a shortfall in numbers of cruisers against the numbers which were required to meet the Royal Navy's needs. Rather than the mixed armament of single-purpose 6-inch (152 mm) low-angle (anti-ship) and 4-inch (102 mm) high-angle (anti-aircraft) guns carried by previous light cruisers, it was decided to fit a dual-purpose main armament, capable of both anti-ship and anti-aircraft fire. This used the new 5.25-inch (133 mm) gun as used in the King George V-class battleships.

Hermione was one of two Dido-class cruisers ordered under the 1937 construction programme for the Royal Navy, following on from five ships ordered the previous year. (Note: The other being Sirius.) Hermione was laid down at Alexander Stephen and Sons Linthouse, Glasgow shipyard as Yard number 560 on 6 October 1937, was launched on 18 May 1939 and completed on 25 March 1941.

Hermione was 512 ft (156.06 m) long overall and 485 ft (147.83 m) between perpendiculars, with a beam of 50 feet 6 inches (15.4 m) and a mean draught of 16 feet 6 inches (5.0 m) (increasing to 17 feet 3 inches (5.3 m) at full load. Displacement was 5,600 long tons (5,700 t) standard and 6,850 long tons (6,960 t) full load. The ship's machinery was arranged in a four-shaft layout, with four Admiralty 3-drum boilers supplying steam at 400 psi (2,800 kPa) to Parsons single-reduction geared steam turbines, rated at 62,000 shaft horsepower (46,000 kW), giving a speed of 32.25 knots (59.73 km/h; 37.11 mph). 1,100 long tons (1,100 t) of fuel oil were carried, giving a range of 4,240 nautical miles (7,850 km; 4,880 mi) at 16 knots (30 km/h; 18 mph), reducing to 3,480 nmi (6,440 km; 4,000 mi) at 20 knots (37 km/h; 23 mph) and 1,500 nmi (2,800 km; 1,700 mi) at 32 knots (59 km/h; 37 mph).

The ship's main armament consisted of ten 5.25-inch guns in five twin turrets on the ship's centreline, with three forward and two aft. Two quadruple 2-pounder (40 mm) pom-pom mounts were mounted on the ship's beams to provide close-in anti-aircraft protection, backed up by two quadruple .50 in (12.7 mm) machine guns on the bridge wings. Two triple 21-inch (533 mm) torpedo tubes provided additional anti-ship capability. Fire control for this armament was provided by a single low angle director control tower (DCT) on the ship's bridge, together with two High Angle Control System (HACS) director towers, one on the ship's bridge and one aft. A 3 in (76 mm) armour belt protected the ship's machinery and magazines with 1 in (25 mm) protecting the ship's shell rooms. Deck armour was also an inch thick, with 3 in (76 mm) plates over the magazines. The 5.25 inch gun turrets had armour of 1 1/2–1 in (38–25 mm) thickness.

=== Modifications ===
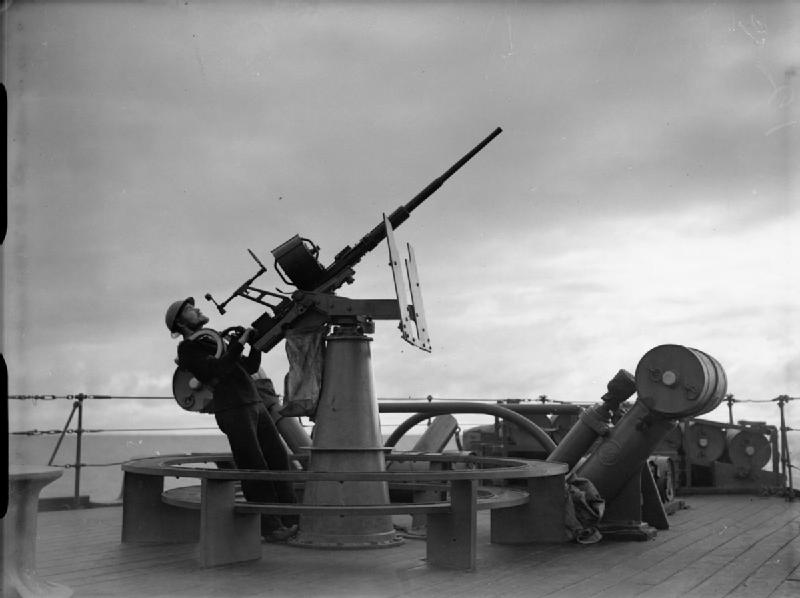
A 20 mm Oerlikon gun on board HMS Hermione, showing a naval gunner utilising the rubber shoulder rests for high-angle firing, with the Thornycroft depth charge thrower Mark II and depth charge launching rail in the background.

While several of the Dido-class were completed with reduced main armaments owing to production problems (the King George V-class battleships had priority for the new guns), Hermione was completed with the full ten-gun outfit. In October–November 1941, the ship's .50 in machine guns were replaced by five single Oerlikon 20 mm cannon.

== History ==
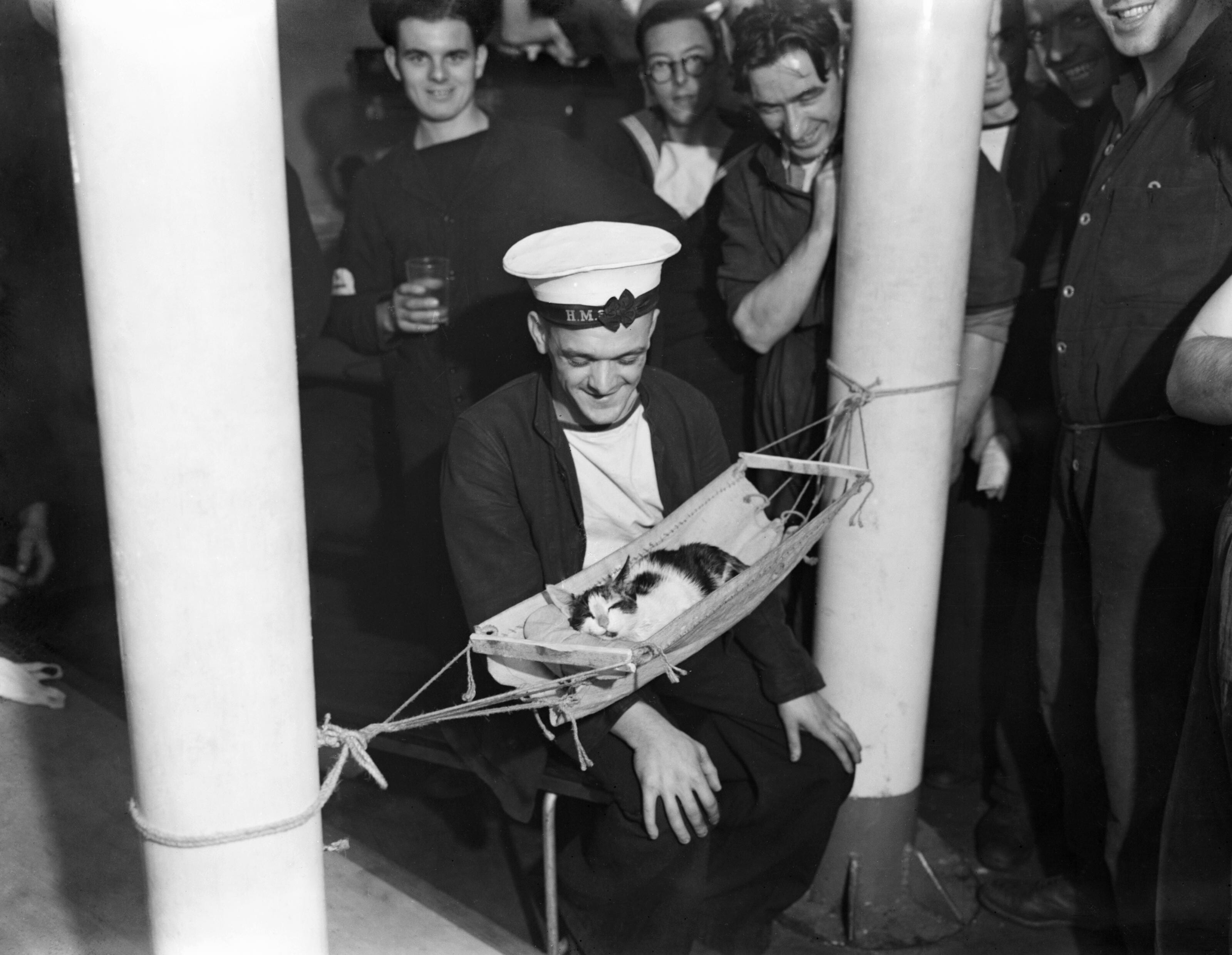
Convoy, Hermione's ship's cat, sleeps in a hammock whilst members of the crew look on

HMS Hermione at Malta Harbour, September 1941

After commissioning and workup, Hermione joined the 15th Cruiser Squadron of the Home Fleet. Hermione took part in the pursuit of the German battleship Bismarck and heavy cruiser Prinz Eugen when they sortied into the North Atlantic in May 1941. Hermione left Scapa Flow on 22 May as part of a force including the battleship King George V and the aircraft carrier Victorious. (Note: The force consisted of King George V, Victorious, the cruisers Galatea, Aurora, Kenya and Hermione and the destroyers Intrepid, Inglefield, Punjabi, Lance, Nestor and Active.) On 24 May, Victorious, escorted by Hermione, Aurora and Kenya, was detached to launch an air attack against Bismarck. The attack by Victorious's Swordfish torpedo bombers resulted in a single torpedo hit on Bismarck which did little damage to the German ship. On 25 May, Hermione, short of fuel, was detached from the chase in order to refuel at Iceland. Following the sinking of Bismarck, the British launched a major operation against German supply ships in the Atlantic which supported the operations of surface raiders, with Hermione taking part in searches for these supply ships and German blockade runners before joining Force H, based at Gibraltar on 22 June. Hermione was then deployed to the Mediterranean. On 2 August 1941, whilst helping to protect a convoy, Hermione attacked by ramming the Italian submarine Tembien, sinking her; an action commemorated in a propaganda painting by artist Marcus Stone.

=== Fate ===
While under Captain G.N. Oliver, DSO, RN, Hermione was part of the Force A group which escorted supply convoy MW-11, under Rear Admiral Philip Vian, from Alexandria to Malta in Operation Vigorous. On the 14th and 15 June 1942, the Hermione expended most of her ammunition while defending the ships against heavy air attacks and had to return to Alexandria, escorted by HMS Aldenham, HMS Beaufort, and HMS Exmoor.

At 23:20 hours on 15 June, U-205 (under Kapitänleutnant Franz-Georg Reschke) spotted a group of warships north of Sollum and attacked two destroyers with one G7e torpedo each at 23:38 and 23:40 hours, but missed both. Only then did U-205 recognise one of the shadows as a cruiser and fired a spread of three torpedoes at 00:19 hours, hitting Hermione on the starboard side. The ship immediately settled by the stern with a list of 22° before ultimately capsizing, remaining afloat for 21 minutes before sinking. Eight officers and 80 ratings were lost, including the ship's cat. The survivors were picked up by the escorting destroyers and were landed at Alexandria.

== Bibliography ==
- Barnett, Corelli (2000). Engage The Enemy More Closely. London: Penguin. ISBN 0-141-39008-5.
- Brown, David K. (2012). Nelson to Vanguard: Warship Design and Development 1923–1945. Barnsley: Seaforth. ISBN 978-1-84832-149-6.
- Campbell, N.J.M. (1980). "Great Britain". In Chesneau, Roger (ed.). Conway's All the World's Fighting Ships 1922–1946. New York: Mayflower Books. pp. 2–85. ISBN 0-8317-0303-2.
- Colledge, J. J.; Warlow, Ben (2006) [1969]. Ships of the Royal Navy: The Complete Record of All Fighting Ships of the Royal Navy from the 15th Century to the Present (3rd Rev ed.). London: Chatham Publishing. ISBN 978-1-86176-281-8. OCLC 67375475.
- Friedman, Norman (2010). British Cruisers: Two World Wars and After. Barnsley: Seaforth Publishing. ISBN 978-1-59114-078-8.
- Lenton, H. T. (1973). Navies of the Second World War: British Cruisers. London: Macdonald & Co. ISBN 0-356-04138-7.
- Morgan, Daniel; Taylor, Bruce (2011). U-Boat Attack Logs: A Complete Record of Warship Sinkings from Original Sources 1939–1945. Barnsley: Seaforth. ISBN 978-1-84832-118-2.
- Raven, Alan & Roberts, John (1980). British Cruisers of World War Two. Annapolis, Maryland: Naval Institute Press. ISBN 0-87021-922-7.
- Rohwer, Jürgen; Hümmelchen, Gerhard (1992). Chronology of the War at Sea 1939–1945. London: Greenhill Books. ISBN 1-85367-117-7.
- Rohwer, Jürgen (2005). Chronology of the War at Sea 1939–1945: The Naval History of World War Two (3rd rev. ed.). Annapolis, Maryland: Naval Institute Press. ISBN 1-59114-119-2.
- Whitley, M. J. (1995). Cruisers of World War Two: An International Encyclopedia. London: Cassell. ISBN 1-86019-874-0.
