= HMS Veteran =

Three ships of the Royal Navy have borne the name HMS Veteran:

- HMS Veteran (1787) was a 64-gun third-rate ship of the line, launched in 1787 and broken up in 1816.
- HMS Veteran was an 18-gun fireship launched in 1807 as HMS Prometheus. She was used for harbour service from 1819, was renamed HMS Veteran in 1839 and was broken up in 1852.
- HMS Veteran (D72) was an Admiralty V and W-class destroyer launched in 1919 and sunk in 1942.
