= German submarine U-205 =

German World War II submarine

History

Nazi Germany
- Name: U-205
- Ordered: 16 October 1939
- Builder: Germaniawerft, Kiel
- Yard number: 634
- Laid down: 19 June 1940
- Launched: 20 March 1941
- Commissioned: 3 May 1941
- Fate: Sunk, 17 February 1943

General characteristics
- Class & type: Type VIIC submarine
- Displacement: 769 tonnes (757 long tons) surfaced; 871 t (857 long tons) submerged
- Length: 67.10 m (220 ft 2 in) o/a; 50.50 m (165 ft 8 in) pressure hull
- Beam: 6.20 m (20 ft 4 in) o/a; 4.70 m (15 ft 5 in) pressure hull
- Draught: 4.74 m (15 ft 7 in)
- Installed power: 2,800–3,200 PS (2,100–2,400 kW; 2,800–3,200 bhp) (diesels); 750 PS (550 kW; 740 shp) (electric)
- Propulsion: 2 shafts; 2 × diesel engines; 2 × electric motors
- Speed: 17.7 knots (32.8 km/h; 20.4 mph) surfaced; 7.6 knots (14.1 km/h; 8.7 mph) submerged
- Range: 8,500 nmi (15,700 km; 9,800 mi) at 10 knots (19 km/h; 12 mph) surfaced; 80 nmi (150 km; 92 mi) at 4 knots (7.4 km/h; 4.6 mph) submerged
- Test depth: 230 m (750 ft); Crush depth: 250–295 m (820–968 ft)
- Complement: 4 officers, 40–56 enlisted
- Armament: 5 × 53.3 cm (21 in) torpedo tubes (four bow, one stern); 14 × G7e torpedoes or 26 TMA mines; 1 × 8.8 cm (3.5 in) SK C/34 deck gun (220 rounds); 1 x 2 cm (0.79 in) C/30 AA gun

Service record
- Part of: 3rd U-boat Flotilla; 3 May – 1 November 1941; 29th U-boat Flotilla; 1 November 1941 – 17 February 1943
- Identification codes: M 38 350
- Commanders: Kptlt. Franz-Georg Reschke; 3 May 1941 – 19 October 1942; Oblt.z.S. Friedrich Bürgel; 19 October 1942 – 17 February 1943
- Operations: 11 patrols: 1st patrol: 24 July – 23 August 1941; 2nd patrol: 23 September – 2 October 1941; 3rd patrol: 3 November – 10 December 1941; 4th patrol: 5 January – 10 February 1942; 5th patrol: 17 March – 6 April 1942; 6th patrol: 6 May – 8 June 1942; 7th patrol: 11 – 23 June 1942; 8th patrol: 3 August – 12 September 1942; 9th patrol: a. 20 October – 19 November 1942; b. 20 – 24 November 1942; 10th patrol: 12 – 26 January 1943; 11th patrol: a. 2 – 9 February 1943; b. 11 – 17 February 1943
- Victories: 1 warship sunk (5,450 tons)

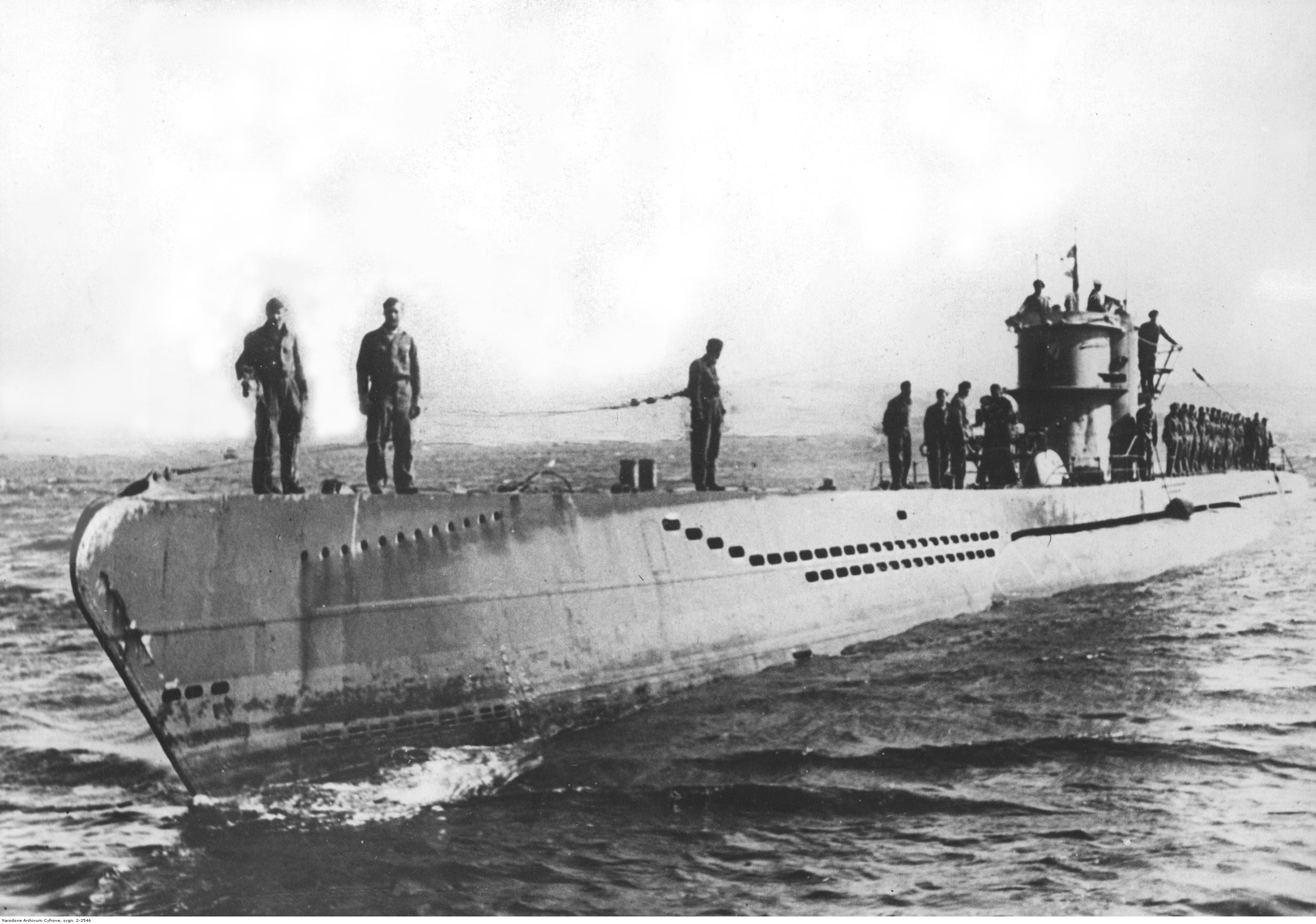
German Type VII submarine U-203, commanded by Rolf Mutzelburg, entering unknown Kriegsmarine base on Atlantic shore.

German submarine U-205 was a Type VIIC U-boat of the Kriegsmarine during World War II. The submarine was laid down on 19 June 1940 by the Friedrich Krupp Germaniawerft yard at Kiel as yard number 634; launched on 20 March 1941; and commissioned on 3 May 1941 under the command of Franz-Georg Reschke.

She was sunk on 17 February 1943 by HMS Paladin at 32°56′N 22°01′E.

== Design ==
German Type VIIC submarines were preceded by the shorter Type VIIB submarines. U-205 had a displacement of 769 tonnes (757 long tons) when at the surface and 871 tonnes (857 long tons) while submerged. She had a total length of 67.10 m (220 ft 2 in), a pressure hull length of 50.50 m (165 ft 8 in), a beam of 6.20 m (20 ft 4 in), a height of 9.60 m (31 ft 6 in), and a draught of 4.74 m (15 ft 7 in). The submarine was powered by two Germaniawerft F46 four-stroke, six-cylinder supercharged diesel engines producing a total of 2,800 to 3,200 metric horsepower (2,060 to 2,350 kW; 2,760 to 3,160 shp) for use while surfaced, two AEG GU 460/8–27 double-acting electric motors producing a total of 750 metric horsepower (550 kW; 740 shp) for use while submerged. She had two shafts and two 1.23 m (4 ft) propellers. The boat was capable of operating at depths of up to 230 metres (750 ft).

The submarine had a maximum surface speed of 17.7 knots (32.8 km/h; 20.4 mph) and a maximum submerged speed of 7.6 knots (14.1 km/h; 8.7 mph). When submerged, the boat could operate for 80 nautical miles (150 km; 92 mi) at 4 knots (7.4 km/h; 4.6 mph); when surfaced, she could travel 8,500 nautical miles (15,700 km; 9,800 mi) at 10 knots (19 km/h; 12 mph). U-205 was fitted with five 53.3 cm (21 in) torpedo tubes (four fitted at the bow and one at the stern), fourteen torpedoes, one 8.8 cm (3.46 in) SK C/35 naval gun, 220 rounds, and a 2 cm (0.79 in) C/30 anti-aircraft gun. The boat had a complement of between forty-four and sixty.

== Service history ==
Part of the 3rd U-boat Flotilla, U-205 carried out two patrols in the North Atlantic. Joining 29th U-boat Flotilla, she carried out a further nine patrols in the Mediterranean.

=== First patrol ===
U-205's first patrol began when she left Trondheim on 24 July 1941; she travelled through the gap between Greenland and Iceland (the Denmark Strait) and docked at Brest in occupied France, on 23 August 1941.

=== Second patrol ===
Leaving Lorient on 23 September 1941, U-205 was attacked and damaged by aircraft on 27 September and returned to port, arriving in Lorient on 2 October 1941.

=== Third patrol ===
On 3 November 1941 U-205 left Lorient and joined Wolfpack Arnauld. Breaking through the Gibraltar barrage, U-205 joined the 29th U-Flotilla in La Spezia on 10 December 1941.

=== Fourth patrol ===
U-205 left La Spezia on 5 January 1942 and returned on 10 February.

=== Fifth patrol ===
Having left La Spezia on 17 March, U-205 reached Salamis on 6 April 1942.

=== Sixth patrol ===
Sailing from La Spezia on 6 May 1942, U-205 reached Salamis on 8 June 1942.

=== Seventh patrol ===
On the return leg, U-205 successfully attacked the British light cruiser HMS Hermione on 16 June 1942, guarding convoy MW-11 killing 87 crewmen and the beloved ship's cat 'Convoy'. The U-boat docked in La Spezia on 23 June.

=== Eighth patrol ===
On 3 August 1942, U-205 sailed from La Spezia for Pula, arriving there on 10 September 1942.

=== Ninth patrol ===
Pola, 20 October 1942 – La Spezia, 19 November 1942 and La Spezia, 20 November 1942 – Pola, 24 November 1942

=== Tenth patrol ===
Pola, 12 January 1943 – Salamis 26 January 1943

=== Last patrol and sinking ===
Leaving Salamis on 2 February 1943, U-205 was manoeuvering to attack a convoy off Apollonia, Cyrenaica on 17 February 1943 when she was spotted by a Bristol Blenheim bomber of the South African Air Force and attacked by British destroyer HMS Paladin at 32°56′N 22°1′E. Forced to surface by depth charges, U-205's crew abandoned ship after opening the sea vents. A boarding party from HMS Paladin managed to salvage documents and radio equipment. A second warship, HMS Gloxinia, attempted to tow the still-floating submarine to the beach, but failed. U-205 sank about 1,000 metres (3,300 ft) off shore.

=== Wolfpacks ===
U-205 took part in one wolfpack, namely:

- Arnauld (5 – 18 November 1941)

=== Aftermath ===
U-205 is widely believed to be the submarine with the erroneous number U-307 in Peter Keeble's book Ordeal by Water, in which he describes his dive to recover encrypting equipment from a sunken U-boat.

== Summary of raiding history ==
Date	Ship Name	Nationality	Tonnage (Tons)	Fate
16 June 1942	HMS Hermione	Royal Navy	5,450	Sunk

== See also ==
- Mediterranean U-boat Campaign (World War II)
- Convoy HG 73

== Bibliography ==
- Busch, Rainer; Röll, Hans-Joachim (1999). German U-boat commanders of World War II : a biographical dictionary. Translated by Brooks, Geoffrey. London, Annapolis, Md: Greenhill Books, Naval Institute Press. ISBN 1-55750-186-6.
- Busch, Rainer; Röll, Hans-Joachim (1999). Deutsche U-Boot-Verluste von September 1939 bis Mai 1945 [German U-boat losses from September 1939 to May 1945]. Der U-Boot-Krieg (in German). Vol. IV. Hamburg, Berlin, Bonn: Mittler. ISBN 3-8132-0514-2.
- Gröner, Erich; Jung, Dieter; Maass, Martin (1991). U-boats and Mine Warfare Vessels. German Warships 1815–1945. Vol. 2. Translated by Thomas, Keith; Magowan, Rachel. London: Conway Maritime Press. ISBN 0-85177-593-4.
- Jak Mallmann Showell, Enigma U-boats, 2000, p. 95.
