= Edward Ellis (Royal Navy officer) =

Royal Navy Rear Admiral (1918–2002)

Rear-Admiral Edward Ellis CB CBE
- Born: 6 September 1918
- Died: 13 January 2002 (aged 83)
- Military career
- Allegiance: United Kingdom
- Branch: Royal Navy
- Service years: 1940-1974
- Rank: Rear-Admiral
- Commands: Royal Naval College, Greenwich
- Conflicts: World War II
- Awards: Commander of the Order of the British Empire; Companion of the Order of the Bath

Rear-Admiral Edward William Ellis, CB, CBE (6 September 1918 – 13 January 2002) was a Royal Navy officer who became President of the Royal Naval College, Greenwich.

== Naval career ==
Ellis joined the Royal Navy in 1940 and served in World War II in the destroyer HMS Broadwater and then in the destroyer HMS Eclipse. He became Secretary to the Fourth Sea Lord in 1956, Secretary to the Commander-in-Chief, South Atlantic and South America in 1959 and Head of the Commander-in-Chief's South-East Secretariat in 1963. He went on to be Secretary to Commander-in-Chief, Portsmouth in 1965 and Secretary to the First Sea Lord in 1966. Appointed CBE in May 1968, his last appointments were as Commodore Royal Naval Barracks Portsmouth in 1968 and President of the Royal Naval College, Greenwich in 1972 before retiring in 1974.

Military offices
Preceded by Martin Lucey	President, Royal Naval College, Greenwich; 1972–1974	Succeeded by Derek Bazalgette
