= Italian submarine Tembien =

Italian submarine

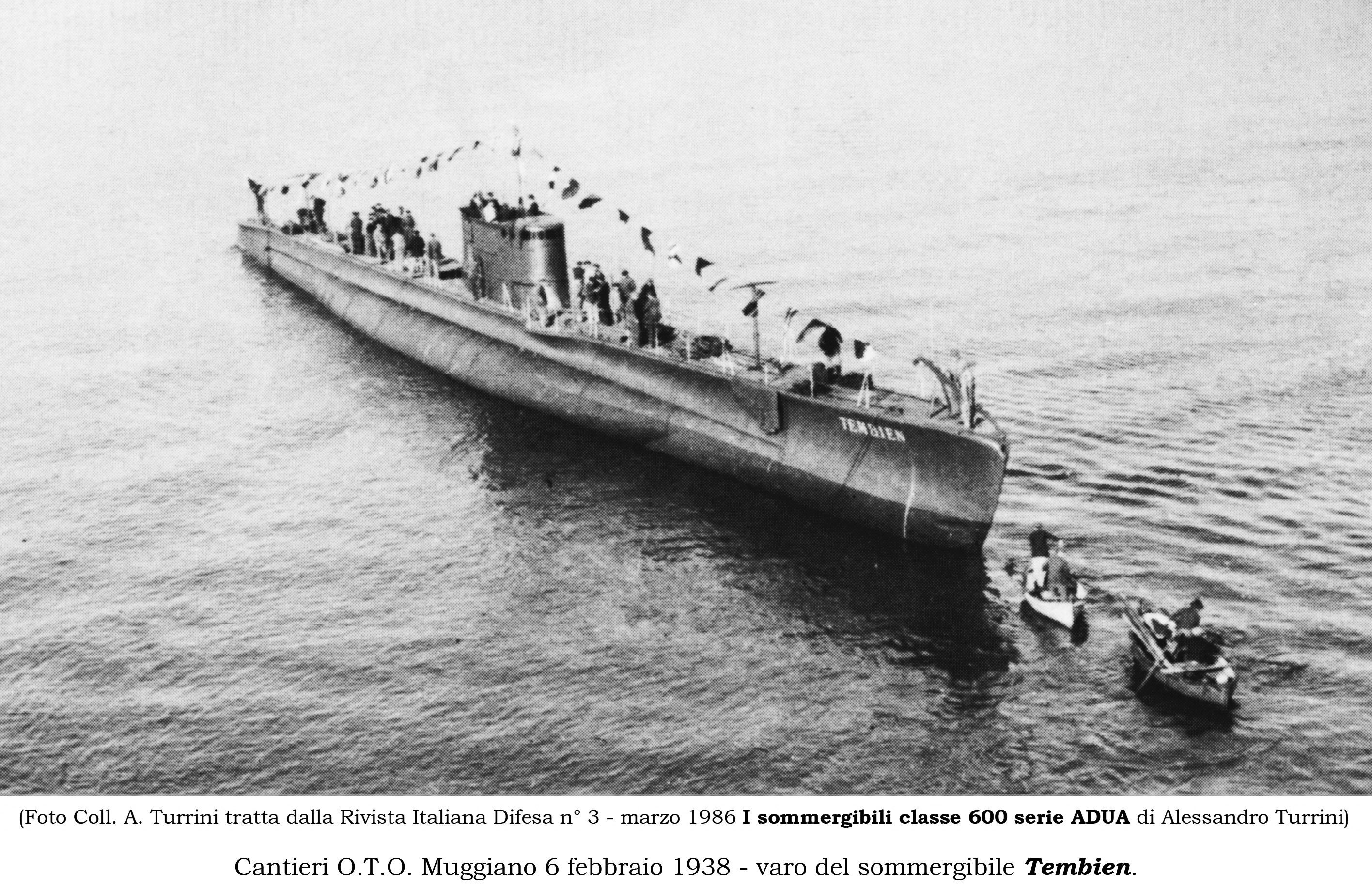
- Launch of RIN Tembien

History

Kingdom of Italy
- Name: Tembien
- Namesake: Tembien
- Builder: OTO, Muggiano
- Laid down: 6 February 1937
- Launched: 6 February 1938
- Commissioned: 1 July 1938
- Fate: Sunk, 2 August 1941

General characteristics
- Class & type: 600-Serie Adua-class submarine
- Displacement: 680 long tons (691 t) surfaced; 844 long tons (858 t) submerged
- Length: 60.28 m (197 ft 9 in)
- Beam: 6.45 m (21 ft 2 in)
- Draught: 4.64 m (15 ft 3 in)
- Installed power: 1,400 hp (1,000 kW) (diesels); 800 hp (600 kW) (electric motors)
- Propulsion: Diesel-electric; 2 × FIAT diesel engines; 2 × Marelli electric motors
- Speed: 14 knots (26 km/h; 16 mph) surfaced; 7.5 knots (13.9 km/h; 8.6 mph) submerged
- Range: 3,180 nmi (5,890 km; 3,660 mi) at 10.5 kn (19.4 km/h; 12.1 mph) surfaced; 74 nmi (137 km; 85 mi) at 4 knots (7.4 km/h; 4.6 mph) submerged
- Test depth: 80 m (260 ft)
- Complement: 44 (4 officers + 40 non-officers and sailors)
- Armament: 1 × 100 mm (4 in) / 47 caliber deck gun; 2 x 1 – 13.2 mm (0.52 in) anti-aircraft guns; 6 × 533 mm (21 in) torpedo tubes (4 forward, 2 aft); 12 × torpedoes

Italian submarine Tembien was an Adua-class submarine built for the Royal Italian Navy (Regia Marina) during the 1930s. It was named after a Tembien region of Ethiopia, where Italian troops fought two battles against more numerous Ethiopian troops during the Second Italo-Ethiopian War.

== Design and description ==
The Adua-class submarines were essentially repeats of the preceding Perla class. They displaced 680 long tons (690 t) surfaced and 844 long tons (858 t) submerged. The submarines were 60.18 meters (197 ft 5 in) long, had a beam of 6.45 meters (21 ft 2 in) and a draft of 4.7 meters (15 ft 5 in).

For surface running, the boats were powered by two 600-brake-horsepower (447 kW) diesel engines, each driving one propeller shaft. When submerged each propeller was driven by a 400-horsepower (298 kW) electric motor. They could reach 14 knots (26 km/h; 16 mph) on the surface and 7.5 knots (13.9 km/h; 8.6 mph) underwater. On the surface, the Adua class had a range of 3,180 nautical miles (5,890 km; 3,660 mi) at 10.5 knots (19.4 km/h; 12.1 mph), submerged, they had a range of 74 nmi (137 km; 85 mi) at 4 knots (7.4 km/h; 4.6 mph).

The boats were armed with six internal 53.3 cm (21.0 in) torpedo tubes, four in the bow and two in the stern. One reload torpedo was carried for each tube, for a total of twelve. They were also armed with one 100 mm (4 in) deck gun for combat on the surface. The light anti-aircraft armament consisted of one or two pairs of 13.2 mm (0.52 in) machine guns.

== Construction and career ==
Upon entering the service, in August of 1938 she was assigned to Leros as part of the V Submarine Group.

After the declaration of war on 10 June 1940, Tembien, now part of the 35 Squadron (III Submarine Group) based out of Messina together with Durbo and Beilul, was assigned to patrol around Malta. The submarine's commander was captain Primo Longobardo.

After several uneventful patrols around Malta in July 1940, she was assigned to patrol off Crete, and then heading to Sollum in August 1940.

In September 1940, Tembien patrolled off Tobruk, and then participated unsuccessfully in counter-operation against British operation "MB5" (Malta garrison reinforcement).

On 6 October 1940 she returned to the base. A new commander, captain Guido Gozzi, was appointed.

Tembien spent November again patrolling around Malta. On 27 November 1940, at 23:24, Tembien sighted three large warships to the south, advancing northwest at an estimated speed of 9 knots. It was the 3rd cruiser squadron (HMS York, HMS Glasgow and HMS Gloucester) participating of in the British operation "Collar". At 23:28 while in the position 36°00′N 14°47′E Tembien launched two torpedoes from 1500 meters at the targets, but they both missed. Unable to hit the targets, Tembien tried to close in even further down to 1000 meters. At 23:33, she launched two more torpedoes, and an explosion was heard after 45 seconds, but no target was actually hit. Tembien quickly disengaged by rapid diving and getting away. British sources don't seem to mention an attack, and it appears British ships did not realize they were being attacked. On 30 November 1940 Tembien returned to the base.

She started the new 1941 by patrolling off Sollum. On 8 January 1941, at 00:45, Tembien sighted a large steamer off Bardia, and launched three torpedoes in a rapid succession. Captain Gozzi observed, however, that torpedoes ran erratically and didn't hit the target. This was the first case of torpedo erratic running that was reported to the Marine Directorate. An investigation that followed found that some components of the torpedo propellers and fins, in a batch produced by the Fiume torpedo factory, to be bent, and thus accounting for their inability to keep direction. On 12 January 1941 Tembien returned to the base.

After a brief patrol off Malta in early February 1941, Tembien entered docks for some work where she remained for the next 4 months.

On 26 June 1941 she left the base to patrol off Cyrenaica. On 29 June 1941, at 20:41, Tembien sighted a formation of British ships off Ras Azzaz, a hundred miles east of Tobruk. The group was composed of destroyers HMS Defender and HMAS Waterhen sailing from Tobruk (besieged by the Axis forces) to Alexandria evacuating troops from the 6th Australian Division. The two destroyers were then attacked off Sollum by 19 Ju 87 "Stuka" bombers: twelve German from StG 1 of the Luftwaffe and seven Italian from the 239 Bomber Squadron. One of these, piloted by Ennio Tarantola, hit HMAS Waterhen on the stern with a 500 kg bomb causing flooding in engine rooms and forcing the crew to abandon the ship. Tembien approached to within 600 meters and tried to deliver coup de grâce to the immobilized destroyer, but HMS Defender detected the submarine, turned toward it and opened fire at it, forcing Tembien to hastily launch two torpedoes from the aft tubes and then quickly dive.

On 31 July 1941 Tembien left Augusta to patrol area west of Malta to form a screen with three other submarines (Fratelli Bandiera, Luciano Manara and Zaffiro ) in an attempt to intercept British naval forces ("Force X" ) that had been reported transiting through the Strait of Sicily. The British "Force X" consisted of HMS Hermione, HMS Arethusa and HMS Manxman which was part The British operation "Style". All three ships were carrying reinforcements and supplies for Malta's garrison and were moving at full speed with the aircraft carrier Ark Royal and destroyers providing distant cover.

On 1 August 1941 Tembien reached her assigned area. In the early hours of 2 August 1941 Tembien sighted British ships while sailing on the surface and tried attacking them unsuccessfully. After one of the aircraft from Ark Royal spotted the submarine, the rest of the convoy was warned, and HMS Hermione moving at 28 knots maneuvered to ram her. Tembien was cut in two sinking at 36°21′N 12°40′E (halfway between Pantelleria and Malta). HMS Arethusa and HMS Manxman, who followed HMS Hermione bumped into the wreck already half-submerged when they passed over the point where Tembien sank. Captain Gozzi, four other officers and 37 of other men died, there were no survivors. HMS Hermione sustained only minor damage during collision and was put in for repairs to her bow structures at Gibraltar upon arrival there from her mission on 4 August.
