= Martin Lucey =

Royal Navy Rear-Admiral (1920–1992)

Rear-Admiral Martin Lucey CB DSC
- Born: 21 January 1920
- Died: 8 July 1992 (aged 72)
- Military career
- Allegiance: United Kingdom
- Branch: Royal Navy
- Service years: 1938 – 1974
- Rank: Rear-Admiral
- Commands: 7th Frigate Squadron; Scotland and Northern Ireland; Royal Naval College, Greenwich
- Conflicts: World War II
- Awards: Companion of the Order of the Bath; Distinguished Service Cross

Rear-Admiral Martin Noel Lucey CB DSC (21 January 1920 – 8 July 1992) was a Royal Navy officer who became Flag Officer, Scotland and Northern Ireland and Admiral President Royal Naval College, Greenwich.

== Naval career ==
Educated at Gresham's School, Holt, Norfolk, Lucey entered the Royal Navy in 1938. He served in the Second World War being promoted lieutenant in 1941 and being awarded the DSC in 1944. He became commanding officer of the frigate HMS Puma as well as captain of the 7th Frigate Squadron in early 1966, director of Seamen Officer Appointments later that year, and Senior Naval Officer West Indies in 1968. He went on to be Admiral President Royal Naval College, Greenwich in 1970 and Flag Officer, Scotland and Northern Ireland in 1972 before retiring in 1974.

In retirement Lucey lived in Houghton, West Sussex, and died on 8 July 1992.

== Family ==
In 1947 he married Barbara Mary Key. They had two sons and one daughter.

Military offices
Preceded by Edward Gueritz	President, Royal Naval College, Greenwich; 1970–1972	Succeeded by Edward Ellis
Preceded by David Dunbar-Nasmith	Flag Officer, Scotland and Northern Ireland; 1972–1974	Succeeded by Sir Anthony Troup
