= Sandwich theory =

Theory describing the behaviour of three-layered structures or materials

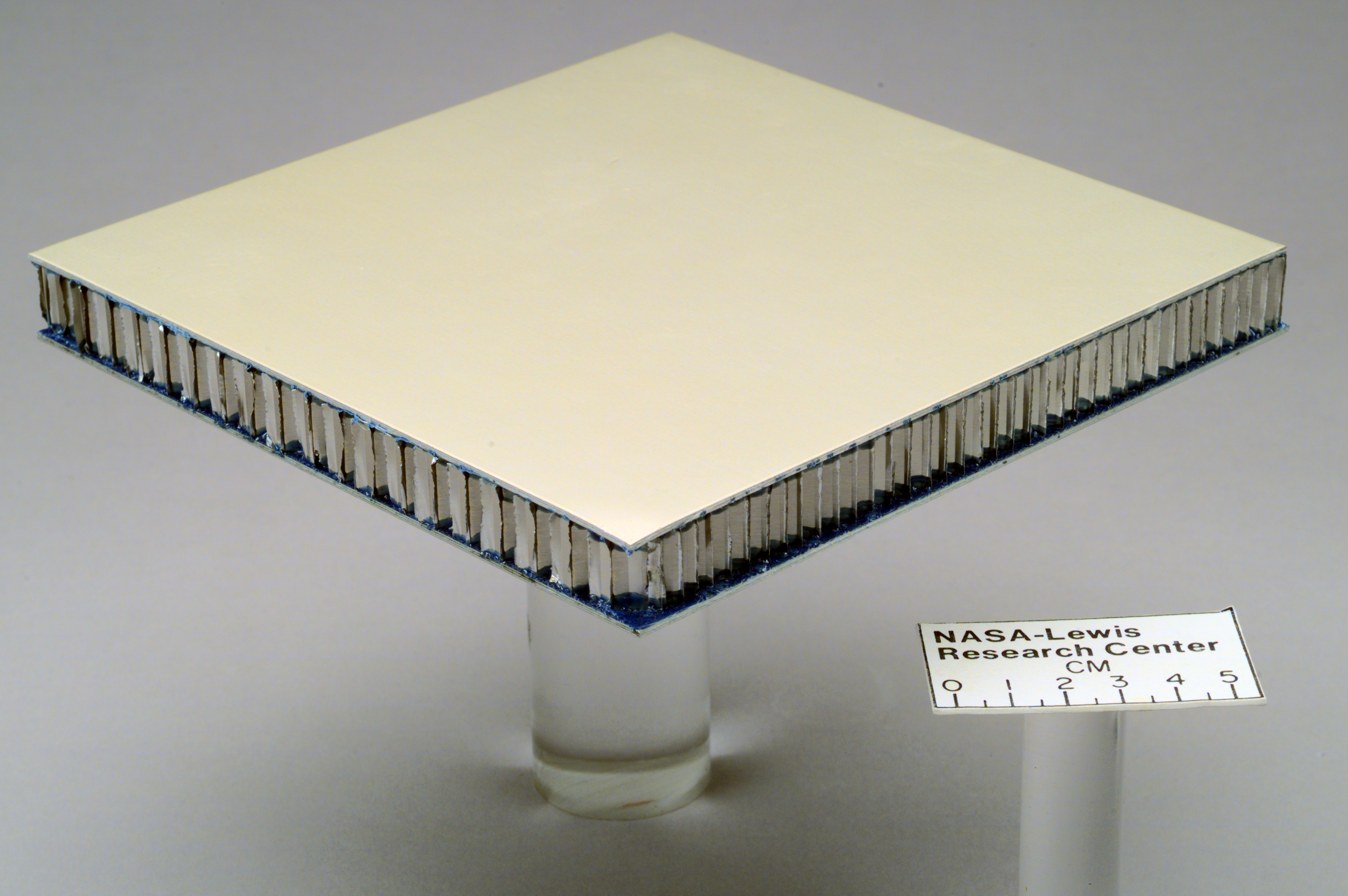
Composite sandwich structure panel used for testing at NASA

Sandwich theory describes the behaviour of a beam, plate, or shell which consists of three layers—two facesheets and one core. The most commonly used sandwich theory is linear and is an extension of first-order beam theory. The linear sandwich theory is of importance for the design and analysis of sandwich panels, which are of use in building construction, vehicle construction, airplane construction, and refrigeration engineering.

Some advantages of sandwich construction are:

- Sandwich cross-sections are composite. They usually consist of a low- to moderate-stiffness core which is connected with two stiff exterior facesheets. The composite has a considerably higher ratio of shear stiffness to weight than an equivalent beam made of only the core material or the facesheet material. The composite also has a high ratio of tensile strength to weight.
- The high stiffness of the facesheets leads to a high ratio of bending stiffness to weight for the composite.

The behavior of a beam with sandwich cross-section under a load differs from a beam with a constant elastic cross section. If the radius of curvature during bending is large compared to the thickness of the sandwich beam and the strains in the component materials are small, then the deformation of a sandwich composite beam can be separated into two parts:

- deformations due to bending moments or bending deformation, and
- deformations due to transverse forces, also called shear deformation.

Sandwich beam, plate, and shell theories usually assume that the reference stress state is one of zero stress. However, during curing, differences of temperature between the facesheets persist because of the thermal separation by the core material. These temperature differences, coupled with different linear expansions of the facesheets, can lead to a bending of the sandwich beam in the direction of the warmer facesheet. If the bending is constrained during the manufacturing process, then residual stresses can develop in the components of a sandwich composite. The superposition of a reference stress state on the solutions provided by sandwich theory is possible when the problem is linear. However, when large elastic deformations and rotations are expected, the initial stress state has to be incorporated directly into the sandwich theory.

== Engineering sandwich beam theory ==
Bending of a sandwich beam without extra deformation due to core shear.

In the engineering theory of sandwich beams, the axial strain is assumed to vary linearly over the cross-section of the beam as in Euler-Bernoulli theory:

$$\varepsilon_{xx}(x,z) = -z~\cfrac{\mathrm{d}^2 w}{\mathrm{d} x^2}$$

Therefore, the axial stress in the sandwich beam is given by

$$\sigma_{xx}(x,z) = -z~E(z)~\cfrac{\mathrm{d}^2 w}{\mathrm{d} x^2},$$

where $E(z)$ is the Young's modulus, which is a function of the location along the thickness of the beam. The bending moment in the beam is then given by

$$M_x(x) = \iint z~\sigma_{xx}~\mathrm{d}z\,\mathrm{d}y = -\left(\iint z^2 E(z)~\mathrm{d}z\,\mathrm{d}y\right)~\cfrac{\mathrm{d}^2 w}{\mathrm{d} x^2} =: -D~\cfrac{\mathrm{d}^2 w}{\mathrm{d} x^2}$$

The quantity $D$ is called the flexural stiffness of the sandwich beam. The shear force $Q_x$ is defined as

$$Q_x = \frac{\mathrm{d} M_x}{\mathrm{d} x}.$$

Using these relations, we can show that the stresses in a sandwich beam with a core of thickness $2h$ and modulus $E^c$ and two facesheets each of thickness $f$ and modulus $E^f$ are given by

$$\begin{align}
\sigma_{xx}^{\mathrm{f}} & = \cfrac{z E^{\mathrm{f}} M_x}{D} ~;~~ &
\sigma_{xx}^{\mathrm{c}} & = \cfrac{z E^{\mathrm{c}} M_x}{D} \\
\tau_{xz}^{\mathrm{f}} & = \cfrac{Q_x E^{\mathrm{f}}}{2D}\left[(h+f)^2-z^2\right] ~;~~ &
\tau_{xz}^{\mathrm{c}} & = \cfrac{Q_x}{2D}\left[ E^{\mathrm{c}}\left(h^2-z^2\right) + E^{\mathrm{f}} f(f+2h)\right]
\end{align}$$

Derivation of engineering sandwich beam stresses
Since

$$\cfrac{d^2 w}{d x^2}= -\cfrac{M_x(x)}{D}$$

we can write the axial stress as

$$\sigma_{xx}(x,z) = \cfrac{z~E(z)~M_x(x)}{D}$$

The equation of equilibrium for a two-dimensional solid is given by

$$\frac{\partial \sigma_{xx}}{\partial x} + \frac{\partial \tau_{xz}}{\partial z} = 0$$

where $\tau_{xz}$ is the shear stress. Therefore,

$$\tau_{xz}(x,z) = \int \frac{\partial \sigma_{xx}}{\partial x}~\mathrm{d}z + C(x)
= \int \cfrac{z~E(z)}{D}~\frac{\mathrm{d} M_{x}}{\mathrm{d} x}~\mathrm{d}z + C(x)$$

where $C(x)$ is a constant of integration. Therefore,

$$\tau_{xz}(x,z) = \cfrac{Q_x}{D}\int z~E(z)~\mathrm{d}z + C(x)$$

Let us assume that there are no shear tractions applied to the top face of the sandwich beam. The shear stress in the top facesheet is given by

$$\tau^{\mathrm{face}}_{xz}(x,z) = \cfrac{Q_xE^f}{D}\int_z^{h+f} z~\mathrm{d}z + C(x)
= \cfrac{Q_x E^f}{2D}\left[(h+f)^2-z^2\right] + C(x)$$

At $z = h+f$, $\tau_{xz}(x,h+f) = 0$ implies that $C(x) = 0$. Then the shear stress at the top of the core, $z = h$, is given by

$$\tau_{xz}(x,h) = \cfrac{Q_x E^f f(f+2h)}{2D}$$

Similarly, the shear stress in the core can be calculated as

$$\tau^{\mathrm{core}}_{xz}(x,z) = \cfrac{Q_xE^c}{D}\int_z^{h} z~\mathrm{d}z + C(x)
= \cfrac{Q_x E^c}{2D}\left(h^2-z^2\right) + C(x)$$

The integration constant $C(x)$ is determined from the continuity of shear stress at the interface of the core and the facesheet. Therefore,

$$C(x) =  \cfrac{Q_x E^f f(f+2h)}{2D}$$

and

$$\tau^{\mathrm{core}}_{xz}(x,z)
= \cfrac{Q_x}{2D}\left[ E^c\left(h^2-z^2\right) + E^f f(f+2h)\right]$$

For a sandwich beam with identical facesheets and unit width, the value of $D$ is

$$\begin{align}
D & = E^f\int_w\int_{-h-f}^{-h} z^2~\mathrm{d}z\,\mathrm{d}y + E^c\int_w\int_{-h}^{h} z^2~\mathrm{d}z\,\mathrm{d}y +
E^f\int_w\int_{h}^{h+f} z^2~\mathrm{d}z\,\mathrm{d}y  \\
& = \frac{2}{3}E^ff^3 + \frac{2}{3}E^ch^3 + 2E^ffh(f+h)~.
\end{align}$$

If $E^f \gg E^c$, then $D$ can be approximated as

$$D \approx \frac{2}{3}E^ff^3 + 2E^ffh(f+h) = 2fE^f\left(\frac{1}{3}f^2+h(f+h)\right)$$

and the stresses in the sandwich beam can be approximated as

$$\begin{align}
\sigma_{xx}^{\mathrm{f}} & \approx \cfrac{z M_x}{\frac{2}{3}f^3 +2fh(f+h)} ~;~~ &
\sigma_{xx}^{\mathrm{c}} & \approx 0 \\
\tau_{xz}^{\mathrm{f}} & \approx \cfrac{Q_x}{\frac{4}{3}f^3+4fh(f+h)}\left[(h+f)^2-z^2\right] ~;~~ &
\tau_{xz}^{\mathrm{c}} & \approx \cfrac{Q_x(f+2h)}{\frac{2}{3}f^2+h(f+h)}
\end{align}$$

If, in addition, $f \ll 2h$, then

$$D \approx 2E^ffh(f+h)$$

and the approximate stresses in the beam are

$$\begin{align}
\sigma_{xx}^{\mathrm{f}} & \approx \cfrac{zM_x}{2fh(f+h)} ~;~~&
\sigma_{xx}^{\mathrm{c}} & \approx 0 \\
\tau_{xz}^{\mathrm{f}} & \approx \cfrac{Q_x}{4fh(f+h)}\left[(h+f)^2-z^2\right] ~;~~&
\tau_{xz}^{\mathrm{c}} & \approx \cfrac{Q_x(f+2h)}{4h(f+h)} \approx \cfrac{Q_x}{2h}
\end{align}$$

If we assume that the facesheets are thin enough that the stresses may be assumed to be constant through the thickness, then we have the approximation

$$\begin{align}
\sigma_{xx}^{\mathrm{f}} & \approx \pm \cfrac{M_x}{2fh} ~;~~&
\sigma_{xx}^{\mathrm{c}} & \approx 0 \\
\tau_{xz}^{\mathrm{f}} & \approx 0 ~;~~ &
\tau_{xz}^{\mathrm{c}} & \approx \cfrac{Q_x}{2h}
\end{align}$$

Hence the problem can be split into two parts, one involving only core shear and the other involving only bending stresses in the facesheets.

== Linear sandwich theory ==
=== Bending of a sandwich beam with thin facesheets ===
Bending of a sandwich beam after incorporating shear of the core into the deformation.

The main assumptions of linear sandwich theories of beams with thin facesheets are:

- the transverse normal stiffness of the core is infinite; that is, the core thickness in the z-direction does not change during bending
- the in-plane normal stiffness of the core is small compared to that of the facesheets; that is, the core does not lengthen or compress in the x-direction
- the facesheets behave according to the Euler-Bernoulli assumptions; that is, there is no xz-shear in the facesheets and the z-direction thickness of the facesheets does not change

However, the xz shear-stresses in the core are not neglected.

==== Constitutive assumptions ====
The constitutive relations for two-dimensional orthotropic linear elastic materials are

$$\begin{bmatrix} \sigma_{xx} \\ \sigma_{zz} \\ \sigma_{zx} \end{bmatrix} =
\begin{bmatrix} C_{11} & C_{13} & 0 \\ C_{13} & C_{33} & 0 \\ 0 & 0 & C_{55} \end{bmatrix}
\begin{bmatrix} \varepsilon_{xx} \\ \varepsilon_{zz} \\ \varepsilon_{zx} \end{bmatrix}.$$

The assumptions of sandwich theory lead to the simplified relations

$$\sigma_{xx}^{\mathrm{face}} = C_{11}^{\mathrm{face}}~\varepsilon_{xx}^{\mathrm{face}} ~;~~
\sigma_{zx}^{\mathrm{core}} = C_{55}^{\mathrm{core}}~\varepsilon_{zx}^{\mathrm{core}} ~;~~
\sigma_{zz}^{\mathrm{face}} = \sigma_{xz}^{\mathrm{face}} = 0 ~;~~ \sigma_{zz}^{\mathrm{core}} = \sigma_{xx}^{\mathrm{core}} = 0$$

and

$$\varepsilon_{zz}^{\mathrm{face}} = \varepsilon_{xz}^{\mathrm{face}} = 0 ~;~~ \varepsilon_{zz}^{\mathrm{core}} = \varepsilon_{xx}^{\mathrm{core}} = 0.$$

The equilibrium equations in two dimensions are

$$\cfrac{\partial \sigma_{xx}}{\partial x} + \cfrac{\partial \sigma_{zx}}{\partial z} = 0 ~;~~
\cfrac{\partial \sigma_{zx}}{\partial x} + \cfrac{\partial \sigma_{zz}}{\partial z} = 0.$$

The assumptions for a sandwich beam and the equilibrium equation imply that

$$\sigma_{xx}^{\mathrm{face}} \equiv \sigma_{xx}^{\mathrm{face}}(z) ~;~~
\sigma_{zx}^{\mathrm{core}} = \mathrm{constant}.$$

Therefore, for homogeneous facesheets and core, the strains also have the form

$$\varepsilon_{xx}^{\mathrm{face}} \equiv \varepsilon_{xx}^{\mathrm{face}}(z) ~;~~
\varepsilon_{zx}^{\mathrm{core}} = \mathrm{constant}.$$

==== Kinematics ====
Bending of a sandwich beam. The total deflection is the sum of a bending part w_{b} and a shear part w_{s}.

Shear strains during the bending of a sandwich beam.

Let the sandwich beam be subjected to a bending moment $M$ and a shear force $Q$. Let the total deflection of the beam due to these loads be $w$. The adjacent figure shows that, for small displacements, the total deflection of the mid-surface of the beam can be expressed as the sum of two deflections, a pure bending deflection $w_b$ and a pure shear deflection $w_s$:

$$w(x) = w_b(x) + w_s(x).$$

From the geometry of the deformation we observe that the engineering shear strain ($\gamma$) in the core is related the effective shear strain in the composite by the relation

$$\gamma_{zx}^{\mathrm{core}} = \frac{2h + f}{2h}~\gamma_{zx}^{\mathrm{beam}}.$$

Note the shear strain in the core is larger than the effective shear strain in the composite and that small deformations ($\tan \gamma \approx \gamma$) are assumed in deriving the above relation. The effective shear strain in the beam is related to the shear displacement by the relation

$$\gamma_{zx}^{\mathrm{beam}} = \cfrac{\mathrm{d} w_s}{\mathrm{d} x}.$$

The facesheets are assumed to deform in accordance with the assumptions of Euler-Bernoulli beam theory. The total deflection of the facesheets is assumed to be the superposition of the deflections due to bending and that due to core shear. The $x$-direction displacements of the facesheets due to bending are given by

$$u_b^{\mathrm{face}}(x,z) = -z~\cfrac{\mathrm{d} w_b}{\mathrm{d} x}.$$

The displacement of the top facesheet due to shear in the core is

$$u_s^{\mathrm{topface}}(x,z) = -\left(z - h - \tfrac{f}{2}\right)~\cfrac{\mathrm{d} w_s}{\mathrm{d} x},$$

and that of the bottom facesheet is

$$u_s^{\mathrm{botface}}(x,z) = -\left(z + h + \tfrac{f}{2}\right)~\cfrac{\mathrm{d} w_s}{\mathrm{d} x}.$$

The normal strains in the two facesheets are given by

$$\varepsilon_{xx} = \cfrac{\partial u_b}{\partial x} + \cfrac{\partial u_s}{\partial x}.$$

Therefore,

$$\varepsilon_{xx}^{\mathrm{topface}}  = -z~\cfrac{\mathrm{d}^2 w_b}{\mathrm{d} x^2} -\left(z - h - \tfrac{f}{2}\right)~\cfrac{\mathrm{d}^2 w_s}{\mathrm{d} x^2} ~;~~
\varepsilon_{xx}^{\mathrm{botface}}  = -z~\cfrac{\mathrm{d}^2 w_b}{\mathrm{d} x^2} -\left(z + h + \tfrac{f}{2}\right)~\cfrac{\mathrm{d}^2 w_s}{\mathrm{d} x^2}.$$

==== Stress-displacement relations ====
The shear stress in the core is given by

$$\sigma_{zx}^{\mathrm{core}} = C^{\mathrm{core}}_{55}~\varepsilon_{zx}^{\mathrm{core}} = \cfrac{C_{55}^{\mathrm{core}}}{2}~\gamma_{zx}^{\mathrm{core}} = \tfrac{2h + f}{4h}~C_{55}^{\mathrm{core}}~\gamma_{zx}^{\mathrm{beam}}$$

or

$$\sigma_{zx}^{\mathrm{core}} = \tfrac{2h + f}{4h}~C_{55}^{\mathrm{core}}~\cfrac{\mathrm{d} w_s}{\mathrm{d} x}.$$

The normal stresses in the facesheets are given by

$$\sigma_{xx}^{\mathrm{face}} = C_{11}^{\mathrm{face}}~\varepsilon_{xx}^{\mathrm{face}}.$$

Hence,

$$\begin{align}
\sigma_{xx}^{\mathrm{topface}} & = -z~C_{11}^{\mathrm{face}}~\cfrac{\mathrm{d}^2 w_b}{\mathrm{d} x^2} -\left(z - h - \tfrac{f}{2}\right)~C_{11}^{\mathrm{face}}~\cfrac{\mathrm{d}^2 w_s}{\mathrm{d} x^2}
& = & -z~C_{11}^{\mathrm{face}}~\cfrac{\mathrm{d}^2 w}{\mathrm{d} x^2} + \left(\tfrac{2h+f}{2}\right)~C_{11}^{\mathrm{face}}~\cfrac{\mathrm{d}^2 w_s}{\mathrm{d} x^2}\\
\sigma_{xx}^{\mathrm{botface}} & = -z~C_{11}^{\mathrm{face}}~\cfrac{\mathrm{d}^2 w_b}{\mathrm{d} x^2} -\left(z + h + \tfrac{f}{2}\right)~C_{11}^{\mathrm{face}}~\cfrac{\mathrm{d}^2 w_s}{\mathrm{d} x^2}
& = & -z~C_{11}^{\mathrm{face}}~\cfrac{\mathrm{d}^2 w}{\mathrm{d} x^2} - \left(\tfrac{2h+f}{2}\right)~C_{11}^{\mathrm{face}}~\cfrac{\mathrm{d}^2 w_s}{\mathrm{d} x^2}
\end{align}$$

==== Resultant forces and moments ====
The resultant normal force in a face sheet is defined as

$$N^{\mathrm{face}}_{xx} := \int_{-f/2}^{f/2} \sigma^{\mathrm{face}}_{xx}~\mathrm{d}z_f$$

and the resultant moments are defined as

$$M^{\mathrm{face}}_{xx} := \int_{-f/2}^{f/2} z_f~\sigma^{\mathrm{face}}_{xx}~\mathrm{d}z_f,$$

where

$$z_f^{\mathrm{topface}} := z - h - \tfrac{f}{2} ~;~~ z_f^{\mathrm{botface}} := z + h + \tfrac{f}{2}.$$

Using the expressions for the normal stress in the two facesheets gives

$$\begin{align}
N^{\mathrm{topface}}_{xx} & = -f\left(h + \tfrac{f}{2}\right)~C_{11}^{\mathrm{face}}~\cfrac{\mathrm{d}^2 w_b}{\mathrm{d} x^2} = - N^{\mathrm{botface}}_{xx} \\
M^{\mathrm{topface}}_{xx} & = -\cfrac{f^3~C_{11}^{\mathrm{face}}}{12}\left(\cfrac{\mathrm{d}^2 w_b}{\mathrm{d} x^2} + \cfrac{\mathrm{d}^2 w_s}{\mathrm{d} x^2}\right) = -\cfrac{f^3~C_{11}^{\mathrm{face}}}{12}~\cfrac{\mathrm{d}^2 w}{\mathrm{d} x^2} = M^{\mathrm{botface}}_{xx}
\end{align}$$

In the core, the resultant moment is

$$M^{\mathrm{core}}_{xx} := \int_{-h}^{h} z~\sigma^{\mathrm{core}}_{xx}~\mathrm{d}z = 0.$$

The total bending moment in the beam is

$$M = N_{xx}^{\mathrm{topface}}~(2h+f) + 2~M^{\mathrm{topface}}_{xx}$$

or

$$M = -\cfrac{f(2h+f)^2}{2}~C_{11}^{\mathrm{face}}~\cfrac{\mathrm{d}^2 w_b}{\mathrm{d} x^2} - \cfrac{f^3}{6}~C_{11}^{\mathrm{face}}~\cfrac{\mathrm{d}^2 w}{\mathrm{d} x^2}.$$

The shear force $Q_x$ in the core is defined as

$$Q_x^{\mathrm{core}} = \kappa\int_{-h}^h \sigma_{xz}~dz = \tfrac{\kappa(2h+f)}{2}~C_{55}^{\mathrm{core}}~\cfrac{\mathrm{d}w_s}{\mathrm{d}x},$$

where $\kappa$ is a shear correction coefficient. The shear force in the facesheets can be computed from the bending moments using the relation

$$Q_x^{\mathrm{face}} = \cfrac{\mathrm{d}M_{xx}^{\mathrm{face}}}{\mathrm{d}x}$$

or

$$Q_x^{\mathrm{face}} = -\cfrac{f^3~C_{11}^{\mathrm{face}}}{12}~\cfrac{\mathrm{d}^3 w}{\mathrm{d} x^3}.$$

For thin facesheets, the shear force in the facesheets is usually ignored.

==== Bending and shear stiffness ====
The bending stiffness of the sandwich beam is given by

$$D^{\mathrm{beam}} = -M\bigg/\frac{\mathrm{d}^2 w}{\mathrm{d}x^2}.$$

From the expression for the total bending moment in the beam, we have

$$M = -\cfrac{f(2h+f)^2}{2}~C_{11}^{\mathrm{face}}~\cfrac{\mathrm{d}^2 w_b}{\mathrm{d} x^2} - \cfrac{f^3}{6}~C_{11}^{\mathrm{face}}~\cfrac{\mathrm{d}^2 w}{\mathrm{d} x^2}.$$

For small shear deformations, the above expression can be written as

$$M \approx -\cfrac{f[3(2h+f)^2+f^2]}{6}~C_{11}^{\mathrm{face}}~\cfrac{\mathrm{d}^2 w}{\mathrm{d} x^2}.$$

Therefore, the bending stiffness of the sandwich beam (with $f \ll 2h$) is given by

$$D^{\mathrm{beam}} \approx \cfrac{f[3(2h+f)^2+f^2]}{6}~C_{11}^{\mathrm{face}} \approx  \cfrac{f(2h+f)^2}{2}~C_{11}^{\mathrm{face}}$$

and that of the facesheets is

$$D^{\mathrm{face}} = \cfrac{f^3}{12}~C_{11}^{\mathrm{face}}.$$

The shear stiffness of the beam is given by

$$S^{\mathrm{beam}} = Q_x\bigg/\frac{\mathrm{d}w_s}{\mathrm{d}x}.$$

Therefore, the shear stiffness of the beam, which is equal to the shear stiffness of the core, is

$$S^{\mathrm{beam}} = S^{\mathrm{core}} = \cfrac{\kappa(2h+f)}{2}~C_{55}^{\mathrm{core}}.$$

==== Relation between bending and shear deflections ====
A relation can be obtained between the bending and shear deflections by using the continuity of tractions between the core and the facesheets. If we equate the tractions directly, then we get

$$n_x~\sigma_{xx}^{\mathrm{face}} = n_z~\sigma_{zx}^{\mathrm{core}}.$$

At both facesheet-core interfaces, we have $n_x = 1$, but at the top of the core $n_z = 1$ and at the bottom of the core $n_z = -1$. Therefore, traction continuity at $z = \pm h$ leads to

$$2fh~C_{11}^{\mathrm{face}}~\cfrac{\mathrm{d}^2 w_s}{\mathrm{d} x^2} - (2h+f)~C_{55}^{\mathrm{core}}~\cfrac{\mathrm{d} w_s}{\mathrm{d} x} = 4h^2~C_{11}^{\mathrm{face}}~\cfrac{\mathrm{d}^2 w_b}{\mathrm{d} x^2}.$$

The above relation is rarely used because of the presence of second derivatives of the shear deflection. Instead it is assumed that

$$n_z~\sigma_{zx}^{\mathrm{core}} = \cfrac{\mathrm{d} N_{xx}^{\mathrm{face}}}{\mathrm{d}x},$$

which implies that

$$\cfrac{\mathrm{d} w_s}{\mathrm{d} x} = -2fh~\left(\cfrac{C_{11}^{\mathrm{face}}}{C_{55}^{\mathrm{core}}}\right)~\cfrac{\mathrm{d}^3 w_b}{\mathrm{d} x^3}.$$

==== Governing equations ====
Using the above definitions, the governing balance equations for the bending moment and shear force are

$$\begin{align}
M & = D^{\mathrm{beam}}~\cfrac{\mathrm{d}^2 w_s}{\mathrm{d} x^2} - \left(D^{\mathrm{beam}}+2D^{\mathrm{face}}\right)~\cfrac{\mathrm{d}^2 w}{\mathrm{d} x^2}\\
Q & = S^{\mathrm{core}}~\cfrac{\mathrm{d} w_s}{\mathrm{d} x} - 2D^{\mathrm{face}}~\cfrac{\mathrm{d}^3 w}{\mathrm{d} x^3}.
\end{align}$$

We can alternatively express the above as two equations that can be solved for $w$ and $w_s$ as

$$\begin{align}
& \left(\frac{2D^{\mathrm{face}}}{S^{\mathrm{core}}}\right)\cfrac{\mathrm{d}^4 w}{\mathrm{d} x^4} - \left(1+\frac{2D^{\mathrm{face}}}{D^{\mathrm{beam}}}\right)\cfrac{\mathrm{d}^2 w}{\mathrm{d} x^2} + \left(\cfrac{1}{S^{\mathrm{core}}}\right)~\cfrac{\mathrm{d} Q}{\mathrm{d} x} = \frac{M}{D^{\mathrm{beam}}} \\
& \left(\frac{D^{\mathrm{beam}}}{S^{\mathrm{core}}}\right)\cfrac{\mathrm{d}^3 w_s}{\mathrm{d} x^3} - \left(1+\frac{D^{\mathrm{beam}}}{2D^{\mathrm{face}}}\right)\cfrac{\mathrm{d} w_s}{\mathrm{d} x} - \cfrac{1}{S^{\mathrm{core}}}~\cfrac{\mathrm{d} M}{\mathrm{d} x} = -\left(1+\cfrac{D^{\mathrm{beam}}}{2D^{\mathrm{face}}}\right)\frac{Q}{S^{\mathrm{core}}}.
\end{align}$$

Using the approximations

$$Q \approx \cfrac{\mathrm{d} M}{\mathrm{d} x} ~;~~ q \approx \cfrac{\mathrm{d} Q}{\mathrm{d} x},$$

where $q$ is the intensity of the applied load on the beam, we have

$$\begin{align}
& \left(\frac{2D^{\mathrm{face}}}{S^{\mathrm{core}}}\right)\cfrac{\mathrm{d}^4 w}{\mathrm{d} x^4} - \left(1+\frac{2D^{\mathrm{face}}}{D^{\mathrm{beam}}}\right)\cfrac{\mathrm{d}^2 w}{\mathrm{d} x^2} =  \frac{M}{D^{\mathrm{beam}}}- \cfrac{q}{S^{\mathrm{core}}} \\
& \left(\frac{D^{\mathrm{beam}}}{S^{\mathrm{core}}}\right)\cfrac{\mathrm{d}^3 w_s}{\mathrm{d} x^3} - \left(1+\frac{D^{\mathrm{beam}}}{2D^{\mathrm{face}}}\right)\cfrac{\mathrm{d} w_s}{\mathrm{d} x}  = -\left(\cfrac{D^{\mathrm{beam}}}{2D^{\mathrm{face}}}\right)\frac{Q}{S^{\mathrm{core}}}.
\end{align}$$

Several techniques may be used to solve this system of two coupled ordinary differential equations given the applied load and the applied bending moment and displacement boundary conditions.

==== Temperature dependent alternative form of governing equations ====
Assuming that each partial cross section fulfills Bernoulli's hypothesis, the balance of forces and moments on the deformed sandwich beam element can be used to deduce the bending equation for the sandwich beam.

Figure 1 – Equilibration of a deflected sandwich beam under temperature load and burden in comparison with the undeflected cross section

The stress resultants and the corresponding deformations of the beam and of the cross section can be seen in Figure 1. The following relationships can be derived using the theory of linear elasticity:

$$\begin{align}
M^{\mathrm{core}} &= D^{\mathrm{beam}}\left(\cfrac{\mathrm{d} \gamma_2}{\mathrm{d} x} + \vartheta\right)
= D^{\mathrm{beam}}\left(\cfrac{\mathrm{d} \gamma}{\mathrm{d} x} - \cfrac{\mathrm{d}^2 w}{\mathrm{d} x^2} + \vartheta\right) \\
M^{\mathrm{face}} &= -D^{\mathrm{face}} \cfrac{\mathrm{d}^2 w}{\mathrm{d} x^2} \\
Q^{\mathrm{core}} &= S^{\mathrm{core}} \gamma \\
Q^{\mathrm{face}} &= -D^{\mathrm{face}} \cfrac{\mathrm{d}^3 w}{\mathrm{d} x^3}
\end{align}\,$$

where

$w \,$	transverse displacement of the beam	
$\gamma \,$	Average shear strain in the sandwich	$\gamma = \gamma_1+\gamma_2\,$
$\gamma_1 \,$	Rotation of the facesheets	$\gamma_1=\cfrac{\mathrm{d} w}{\mathrm{d} x}\,$
$\gamma_2 \,$	Shear strain in the core	
$M^{\mathrm{core}} \,$	Bending moment in the core	
$D^{\mathrm{beam}} \,$	Bending stiffness of the sandwich beam	
$M^{\mathrm{face}} \,$	Bending moment in the facesheets	
$D^{\mathrm{face}} \,$	Bending stiffness of the facesheets	
$Q^{\mathrm{core}} \,$	Shear force in the core	
$Q^{\mathrm{face}} \,$	Shear force in the facesheets	
$S^{\mathrm{core}} \,$	Shear stiffness of the core	
$\vartheta \,$	Additional bending as a consequence of a temperature drop	$\vartheta = \frac{\alpha(T_o-T_u)}{e}\,$
$\alpha \,$	Temperature coefficient of expansion of the converings	

Superposition of the equations for the facesheets and the core leads to the following equations for the total shear force $Q$ and the total bending moment $M$:

$$\begin{alignat}{3}
& S^{\mathrm{core}}\gamma - D^{\mathrm{face}} \cfrac{\mathrm{d}^3 w}{\mathrm{d} x^3} = Q            &\quad\quad& (1)\\
& D^{\mathrm{beam}}\left(\cfrac{\mathrm{d} \gamma}{\mathrm{d} x}+\vartheta\right) - \left(D^{\mathrm{beam}}+D^{\mathrm{face}}\right)\cfrac{\mathrm{d}^2 w}{\mathrm{d} x^2} = M &\quad\quad& (2)\,
\end{alignat}$$

We can alternatively express the above as two equations that can be solved for $w$ and $\gamma$, i.e.,

$$\begin{align}
& \left(\frac{D^{\mathrm{face}}}{S^{\mathrm{core}}}\right)\cfrac{\mathrm{d}^4 w}{\mathrm{d} x^4} - \left(1+\frac{D^{\mathrm{face}}}{D^{\mathrm{beam}}}\right)\cfrac{\mathrm{d}^2 w}{\mathrm{d} x^2} =  \frac{M}{D^{\mathrm{beam}}}-\cfrac{q}{S^{\mathrm{core}}}-\vartheta \\
& \left(\frac{D^{\mathrm{beam}}}{S^{\mathrm{core}}}\right)\cfrac{\mathrm{d}^2 \gamma}{\mathrm{d} x^2} - \left(1+\frac{D^{\mathrm{beam}}}{D^{\mathrm{face}}}\right)\gamma = -\left(\cfrac{D^{\mathrm{beam}}}{D^{\mathrm{face}}}\right)\frac{Q}{S^{\mathrm{core}}}\,
\end{align}$$

== Solution approaches ==
Shear and bending deformation of a sandwich composite beam.

The bending behavior and stresses in a continuous sandwich beam can be computed by solving the two governing differential equations.

=== Analytical approach ===
For simple geometries such as double-span beams under uniformly distributed loads, the governing equations can be solved by using appropriate boundary conditions and using the superposition principle. Such results are listed in the standard DIN EN 14509:2006 (Table E10.1). Energy methods may also be used to compute solutions directly.

=== Numerical approach ===
The differential equation of sandwich continuous beams can be solved by the use of numerical methods such as finite differences and finite elements. For finite differences, Berner recommends a two-stage approach. After solving the differential equation for the normal forces in the cover sheets for a single span beam under a given load, the energy method can be used to expand the approach for the calculation of multi-span beams. Sandwich continuous beam with flexible cover sheets can also be laid on top of each other when using this technique. However, the cross-section of the beam has to be constant across the spans.

A more specialized approach recommended by Schwarze involves solving for the homogeneous part of the governing equation exactly and for the particular part approximately. Recall that the governing equation for a sandwich beam is

$$\left(\frac{2D^{\mathrm{face}}}{S^{\mathrm{core}}}\right)\cfrac{\mathrm{d}^4 w}{\mathrm{d} x^4} - \left(1+\frac{2D^{\mathrm{face}}}{D^{\mathrm{beam}}}\right)\cfrac{\mathrm{d}^2 w}{\mathrm{d} x^2} =  \frac{M}{D^{\mathrm{beam}}}-\cfrac{q}{S^{\mathrm{core}}}.$$

If we define

$$\alpha := \cfrac{2D^{\mathrm{face}}}{D^{\mathrm{beam}}} ~;~~ \beta := \cfrac{2D^{\mathrm{face}}}{S^{\mathrm{core}}} ~;~~ W(x) :=  \cfrac{\mathrm{d}^2 w}{\mathrm{d} x^2},$$

then we get

$$\cfrac{\mathrm{d}^2 W}{\mathrm{d} x^2} - \left(\cfrac{1+\alpha}{\beta}\right)~W  =  \frac{M}{\beta D^{\mathrm{beam}}} - \cfrac{q}{D^{\mathrm{face}}}.$$

Schwarze uses the general solution for the homogeneous part of the above equation and a polynomial approximation for the particular solution for sections of a sandwich beam. Interfaces between sections are tied together by matching boundary conditions. This approach has been used in the open source code swe2.

== Practical importance ==
Results predicted by linear sandwich theory correlate well with the experimentally determined results. The theory is used as a basis for the structural report which is needed for the construction of large industrial and commercial buildings which are clad with sandwich panels. Its use is explicitly demanded for approvals and in the relevant engineering standards.

Mohammed Rahif Hakmi and others conducted researches into numerical, experimental behavior of materials and fire and blast behavior of composite materials. He published multiple research articles:

- Local buckling of sandwich panels.
- Face buckling stress in sandwich panels.
- Post-buckling behaviour of foam-filled thin-walled steel beams.
- "Fire resistance of composite floor slabs using a model fire test facility"
- Fire-resistant sandwich panels for offshore structures sandwich panels.
- Numerical Temperature Analysis of Hygroscopic Panels Exposed to Fire.
- Cost Effective Use of Fibre Reinforced Composites Offshore.

Hakmi developed a design method, which had been recommended by the CIB Working Commission W056 Sandwich Panels, ECCS/CIB Joint Committee and has been used in the European recommendations for the design of sandwich panels (CIB, 2000).

== See also ==
- Bending
- Beam theory
- Composite material
- Hill yield criterion
- Sandwich structured composite
- Sandwich plate system
- Composite honeycomb
- Timoshenko beam theory
- Plate theory
- Sandwich panel

== Bibliography ==
- Mohammed Rahif Hakmi
- Klaus Berner, Oliver Raabe: Bemessung von Sandwichbauteilen. IFBS-Schrift 5.08, IFBS e.V., Düsseldorf 2006.
- Ralf Möller, Hans Pöter, Knut Schwarze: Planen und Bauen mit Trapezprofilen und Sandwichelementen. Band 1, Ernst & Sohn, Berlin 2004, ISBN 3-433-01595-3.
