= Stephen Kennedy =

Stephen or Steve Kennedy may refer to:

- Stephen Kennedy (actor) (born 1970), Northern Irish actor
- Stephen Kennedy (engineer) (born 1956), Canadian engineer
- Stephen P. Kennedy (1906-1978), New York City Police Commissioner
- Steve Kennedy (footballer) (born 1965), English footballer
