= Sandwich panel =

Structure made of three layers

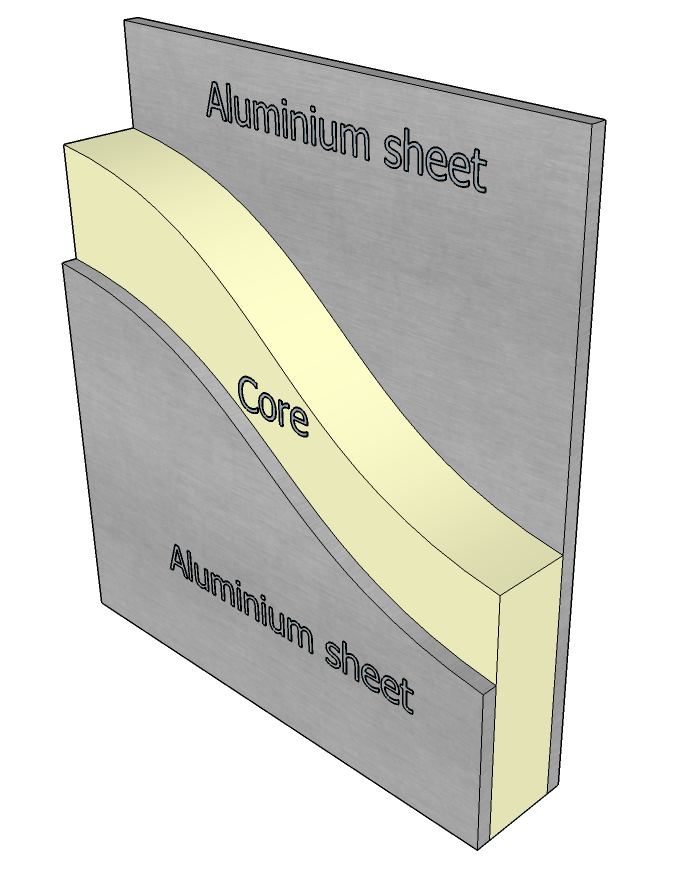
Aluminium composite material panel structure

A sandwich panel is any structure made of three layers: a low-density core (PIR, mineral wool, XPS), and a thin skin-layer bonded to each side. Sandwich panels are used in applications where a combination of high structural rigidity and low weight is required.

The structural functionality of a sandwich panel is similar to the classic I-beam, where two face sheets primarily resist the in-plane and lateral bending loads (similar to flanges of an I- beam), while the core material mainly resists the shear loads (similar to the web of an I-beam). The idea is to use a light/soft but thick layer for the core and strong but thin layers for face sheets. This results in increasing the overall thickness of the panel, which often improves the structural attributes, like bending stiffness, and maintains or even reduces the weight.

Sandwich panels are an example of a sandwich-structured composite: the strength and lightness of this technology makes it popular and widespread. Its versatility means that the panels have many applications and come in many forms: the core and skin materials can vary widely and the core may be a honeycomb or a solid filling. Enclosed panels are termed cassettes.

== Applications ==
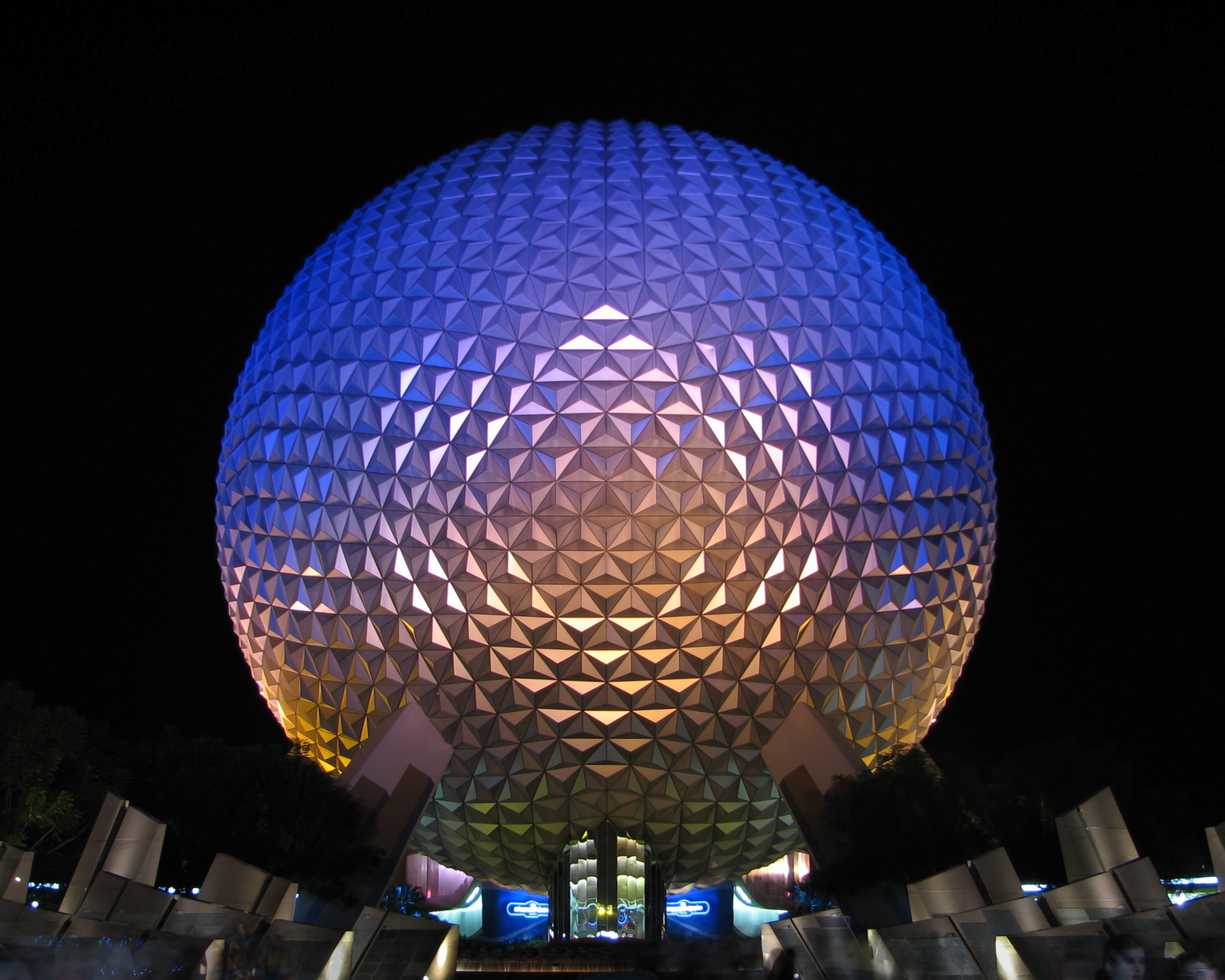
Epcot's Spaceship Earth is an example of the use of ACP in architecture. It is a geodesic sphere composed of 11,324 ACP tiles.

One obvious application is in aircraft, where mechanical performance and weight-saving are essential. Transportation and automotive applications also exist.

In building and construction, these prefabricated products designed for use as building envelopes. They appear in industrial and office buildings, in clean and cold rooms and also in private houses, whether renovation or new-build. They combine a high-quality product with high flexibility regarding design. They generally have a good energy-efficiency and sustainability.

In packaging, applications include fluted polypropylene boards and polypropylene honeycomb boards.

== Types ==
=== 3D-printed biopolymer panels ===
Due to the ability of 3D printers to fabricate complex sandwich panels there has recently been a flourishing of research in this area covering energy absorption, natural fiber, with continuous synthetic fibers, and for vibration. The promise of this technology is for new geometric complexities in sandwich panels not possible with other fabrication processes.

=== SIP ===
Structural insulated panels or structural insulating panels (commonly referred to as SIPs) are panels used as a building material.

=== ACP ===
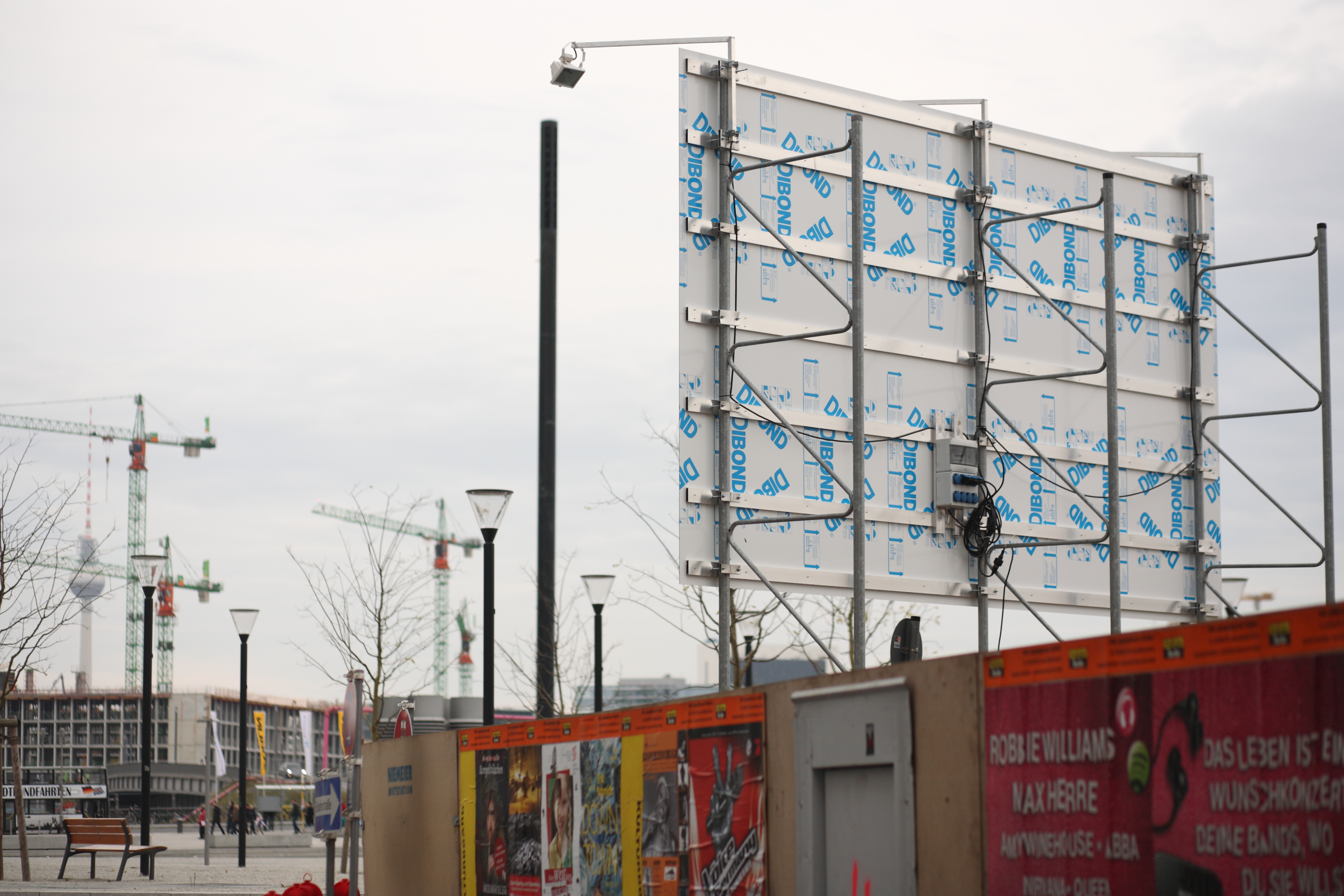
Construction site panel made of aluminium composite material (Dibond)

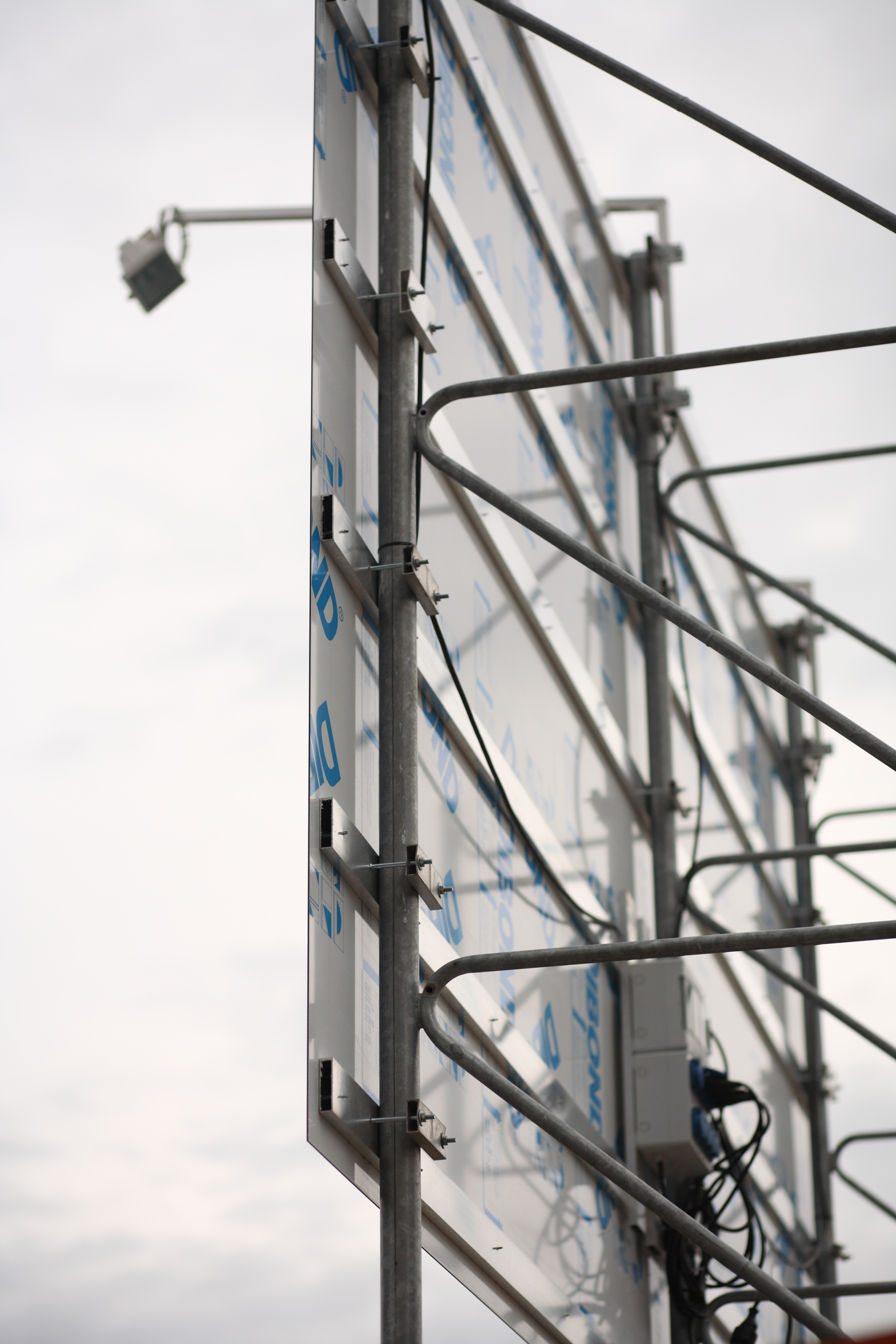
Detail view of construction site panel

Aluminium composite panels (ACP), made of aluminium composite material (ACM), are flat panels consisting of two thin coil-coated aluminium sheets bonded to a non-aluminium core. ACPs are frequently used for external cladding or facades of buildings, insulation, and signage.

ACP is mainly used for external and internal architectural cladding or partitions, false ceilings, signage, machine coverings, container construction, etc. Applications of ACP are not limited to external building cladding, but can also be used in any form of cladding such as partitions, false ceilings, etc. ACP is also widely used within the signage industry as an alternative to heavier, more expensive substrates.

ACP has been used as a light-weight but very sturdy material in construction, particularly for transient structures like trade show booths and similar temporary elements. It has recently also been adopted as a backing material for mounting fine art photography, often with an acrylic finish using processes like Diasec or other face-mounting techniques. ACP material has been used in famous structures as Spaceship Earth, VanDusen Botanical Garden, and the Leipzig branch of the German National Library.

These structures made optimal use of ACP through its cost, durability, and efficiency. Its flexibility, low weight, and easy forming and processing allow for innovative design with increased rigidity and durability. Where the core material is flammable, the usage must be considered. The standard ACP core is polyethylene (PE) or polyurethane (PU). These materials do not have good fire-resistant (FR) properties unless specially treated and are therefore not generally suitable as a building material for dwellings; several jurisdictions have banned their use completely. Arconic, owner of the Reynobond brand, cautions the prospective buyer. Concerning the core, it says that distance of the panel from the ground is a determinant of "which materials are safer to use". In a brochure it has a graphic of a building in flames, with the caption "[a]s soon as the building is higher than the firefighters’ ladders, it has to be conceived with an incombustible material". It shows that the Reynobond polyethylene product is for up to circa 10 meters; the fire-retardant product (c. 70% mineral core) from there to up to c. 30 meters, the height of the ladder; and the European A2-rated product (c. 90% mineral core) for anything above that. In this brochure, Fire Safety in High-rise Buildings: Our Fire Solutions, product specification is only given for the last two products.

The cladding materials, in this case having the highly combustible Polyethylene (PE) core, were implicated as the principal cause of the rapid spread of flame in the 2017 Grenfell Tower fire in London. It has also been involved in high-rise building fires in Melbourne, Australia; France; the United Arab Emirates; South Korea; and the United States. Fire-rated cores (typically designated as "FR" by the manufacturers) are a safer alternative as they have a maximum of 30% Polyethylene Content, and will self-extinguish in the absence of heat/ventilation. As with any building product, fitness for use is dependent on multiple other products and methods. In the case of ACP, building codes in USA have many requirements related to the wall assembly depending on the materials used and the building type. When these building codes are followed, the FR core products are safe. Note that the term ACP does not apply to sandwich panels with Mineral Wool cores, which fall under the category of Insulated Metal Panels (IMP).

The aluminium sheets can be coated with polyvinylidene fluoride (PVDF), fluoropolymer resins (FEVE), or polyester paint. Aluminium can be painted in any kind of colour, and ACPs are produced in a wide range of metallic and non-metallic colours as well as patterns that imitate other materials, such as wood or marble. The core is commonly low-density polyethylene (PE), or a mix of low-density polyethylene and mineral material to exhibit fire retardant properties.

3A Composites (formerly Alcan Composites & Alusuisse) invented aluminium composites in 1964 - as a joint invention with BASF- and commercial production of Alucobond commenced in 1969. The product was patented in 1971, a patent which expired in 1991. After the expiration of the patent several companies started commercial production such as Reynobond (1991), Alpolic (Mitsubishi Chemicals, 1995), etalbond (1995), ACP Bond - DeBond (1992). Today, it is estimated that more than 200 companies across the world are producing ACP.

== History ==
Sandwich panel construction techniques have experienced considerable development in the last 40 years. Previously, sandwich panels were considered products suitable only for functional constructions and industrial buildings. However, their good insulation characteristics, their versatility, quality and appealing visual appearance, have resulted in a growing and widespread use of the panels across a huge variety of buildings.

== Code of practice ==
- Sandwich panels require the CE mark to be sold in Europe. The European sandwich panel standard is EN14509:2013 Self-supporting double-skin metal-faced insulating-panels - Factory-made products – Specifications.
- Sandwich panels quality can be certified by applying the quality level EPAQ

== Characteristics ==
The qualities that have produced the rapid growth in the use of sandwich panels, particularly in construction, include:

=== Thermal resistance ===
- Sandwich panels have λ-values from 0.024 W/(m·K) for polyurethane to 0.05 W/(m·K) for mineral wool. Therefore, they can achieve different U-values depending on the core and the thickness of the panel.
- The installation of a system with sandwich panels minimizes thermal bridges through the joints.

=== Acoustic insulation ===
- The assessed sound reduction measurement lies at approx. 25 dB for PU elements and at approx. 30 dB for MW elements.

=== Mechanical properties ===
- The space between the supports can be up to 11 m (walls), depending on the type of panel used. Normal applications have spaces between the supports that are approx. 3 m – 5 m.
- The thickness of panels is from 40 mm up to more than 200 mm.
- The density of sandwich panels range from 10 kg/m^{2} up to 35 kg/m^{2}, depending on the foam and metal thickness, decreasing time and effort in: transportation, handling and installation.
- All these geometric and material properties influence the global/local failure behavior of the sandwich panels under different loading conditions such as indentation, impact, fatigue and bending.

=== Fire behaviour ===
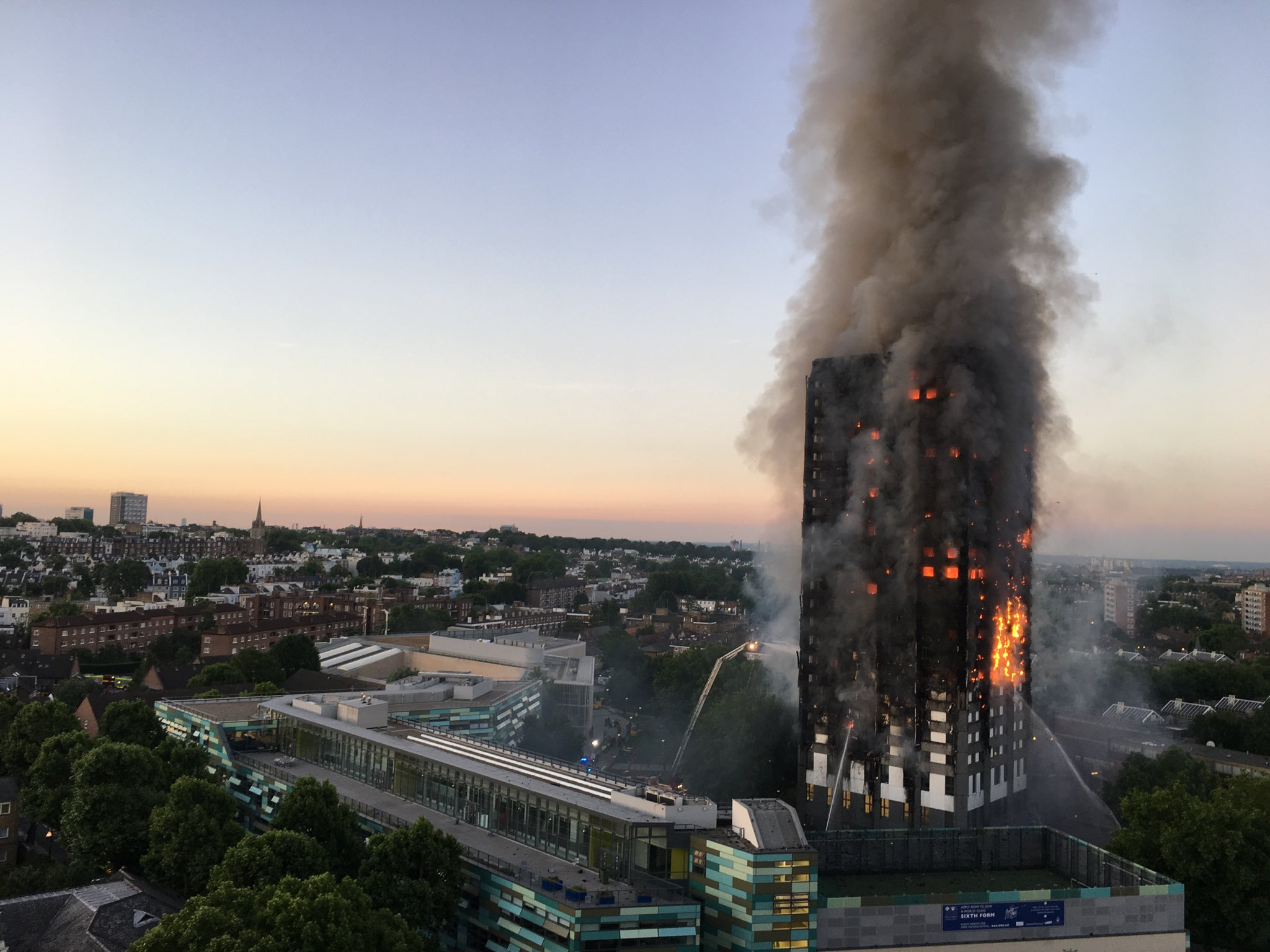
The catastrophic Grenfell Tower Fire, which killed 72 people, was partially attributed to the flammability of the sandwich panel cladding used in the building.

- Sandwich panels have different fire behaviours, resistance and reaction, depending on: the foam, the metal thickness, the coating, etc. The user will need to choose between the different sandwich panel types, depending on the requirements.
- Research by the Association of British Insurers and the Building Research Establishment in the UK highlighted that "sandwich panels do not start a fire on their own, and where these systems have been implicated in fire spread, the fire has often started in high risk areas such as cooking areas, subsequently spreading as a result of poor fire risk management, prevention and containment measures".
- There is evidence that when sandwich panels are used to clad a building it can contribute to the rapid spread of fire up the outside of the building itself. As an architect put it, in choosing the core material for a sandwich panel "I only use the mineral wool ones because your gut tells you it is not right to wrap a building in plastic". In 2000 Gordon Cooke, a leading fire safety consultant, reported that "the use of plastic foam cored sandwich panels ... is difficult to justify when considering life safety". He said the panels "can contribute to the severity and speed of fire development" and this has led to "massive fire losses".
- Design of a cavity between the cladding and the exterior wall of the building (or its sheath of insulation) is also significant: flames can occupy the cavity and be drawn upwards by convection, elongating to create secondary fires, and do so "regardless of the materials used to line the cavities".

=== Impermeability ===
- The assembly system of sandwich panels helps create air and water-tight buildings.

== See also ==
- Sandwich theory
- Sandwich-structured composite
- Composite honeycomb
- Hill yield criteria
- Plate theory
- Thermal insulation
- Acoustic insulation
- Mineral wool
