= Sandwich-structured composite =

Material composed of two thin, stiff skins around a lightweight core

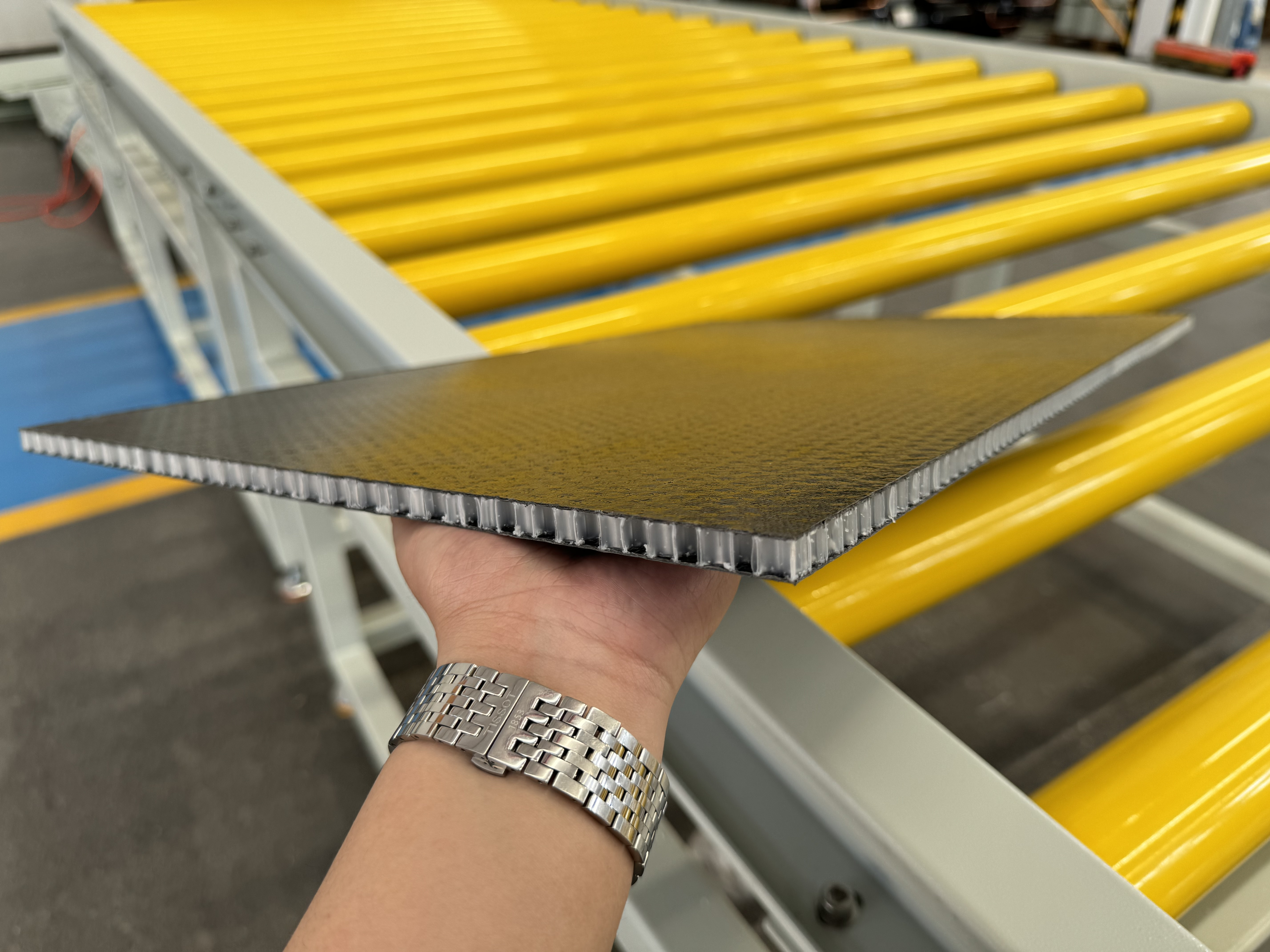
This picture shows composite sandwich panels made from continuous fiber-reinforced thermoplastic UD tape

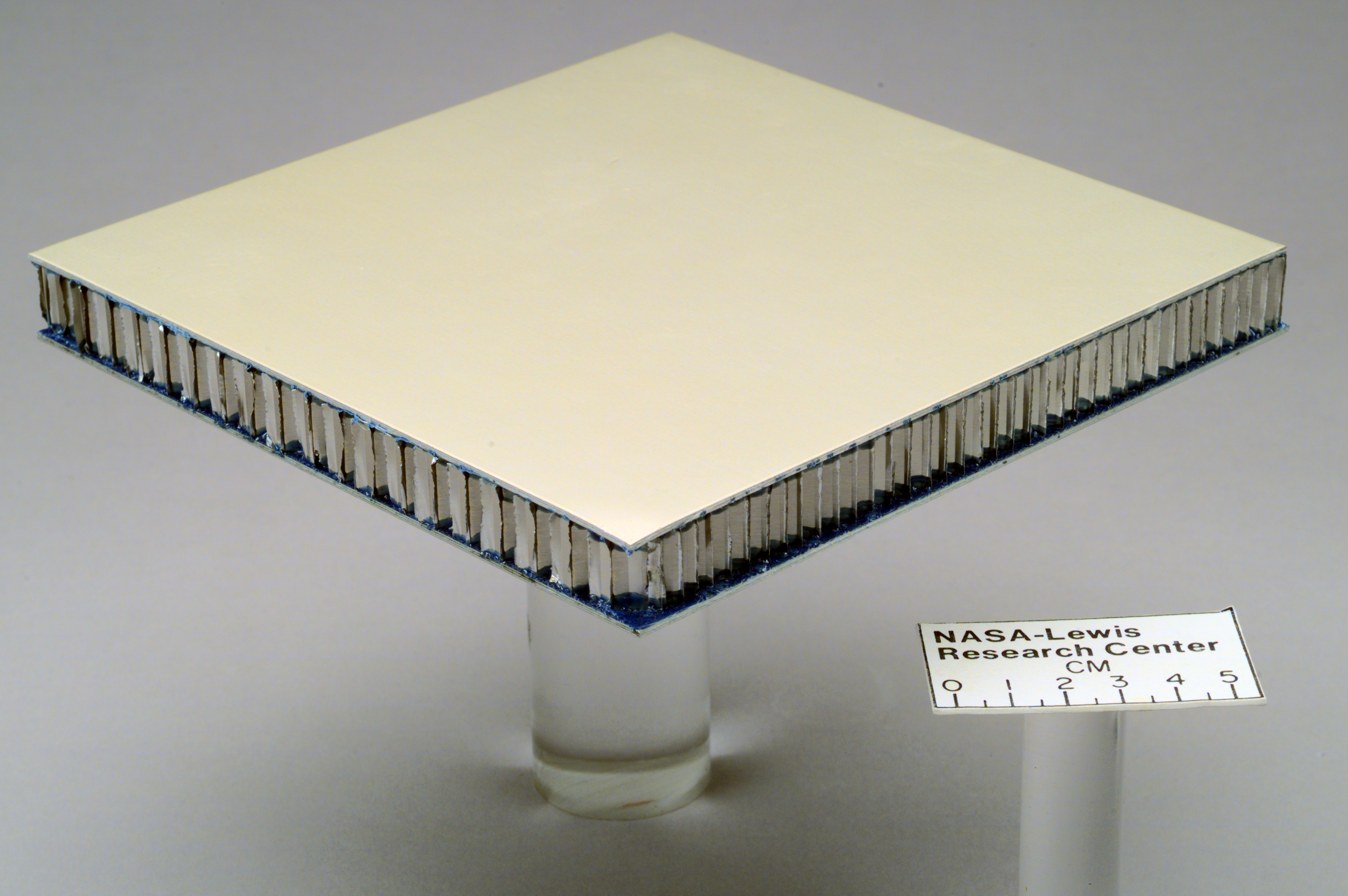
Composite sandwich structure panel used for testing at NASA

In materials science, a sandwich-structured composite is a special class of composite material that is fabricated by attaching two thin-but-stiff skins to a lightweight-but-thick core. The core material is normally of low strength, but its greater thickness provides the sandwich composite with high bending stiffness with overall low density.

Open- and closed-cell-structured foams like polyethersulfone, polyvinylchloride, polyurethane, polyethylene, or polystyrene foams, balsa wood, syntactic foams, and honeycombs are commonly used core materials. Sometimes, the honeycomb structure is filled with other foams for added strength. Open- and closed-cell metal foams can also be used as core materials.

Laminates of glass- or carbon-fiber-reinforced thermoplastics or thermoset polymers (unsaturated polyesters, epoxies, etc.) are widely used as skin materials. Sheet metal is also used as skin material in some cases.

The core is bonded to the skins with an adhesive or, with metal components, by brazing.

Diagram of an assembled composite sandwich (A), and its constituent face sheets or skins (B) and honeycomb core (C) (alternately: foam core)

== History ==
A summary of the important developments in sandwich structures is given below.

- 230 BCE – Archimedes describes the laws of levers and a way to calculate density.
- 25 BCE – Vitruvius reports about the efficient use of materials in Roman truss roof structures.
- 1493 – Leonardo da Vinci discovers the neutral axis and load-deflection relation in three-point bending.
- 1570 – Palladio presents truss-beam constructions with diagonal beams to prevent shear deformations.
- 1638 – Galileo Galilei describes the efficiency of tubes versus solid rods.
- 1652 – Wendelin Schildknecht reports about sandwich beam structures with curved wooden-beam reinforcements.
- 1726 – Jacob Leupold documents tubular bridges with compression-loaded roofs.
- 1786 – Victor Louis uses iron sandwich beams in the galleries of the Palais-Royal in Paris.
- 1802 – Jean-Baptiste Rondelet analyses and documents the sandwich effect in a beam with spacers.
- 1820 – Alphonse Duleau discovers and publishes the moment of inertia for sandwich constructions.
- 1830 – Robert Stephenson builds the Planet locomotive using a sandwich beam frame made of wood plated with iron.
- 1914 – R. Höfler and S. Renyi patent the first use of honeycomb structures for structural applications.
- 1915 – Hugo Junkers patents the first honeycomb cores for aircraft application.
- 1934 – Edward G. Budd patents welded steel honeycomb sandwich panel from corrugated metal sheets.
- 1937 – Claude Dornier patents a honeycomb sandwich panel with skins pressed in a plastic state into the core cell walls.
- 1938 – Norman de Bruyne patents the structural adhesive bonding of honeycomb sandwich structures.
- 1940 – The de Havilland Mosquito was built with sandwich composites—a balsawood core with plywood skins.

== Types of sandwich structures ==
Metal composite material (MCM) is a type of sandwich formed from two thin skins of metal bonded to a plastic core in a continuous process under controlled pressure, heat, and tension.

Recycled paper is also now being used over a closed-cell recycled kraft honeycomb core, creating a lightweight, strong, and fully repulpable composite board. This material is being used for applications including point-of-purchase displays, bulkheads, recyclable office furniture, exhibition stands, wall dividers and terrace boards.

To fix different panels, among other solutions, a transition zone is normally used, which is a gradual reduction of the core height, until the two fiber skins are in touch. In this place, the fixation can be made by means of bolts, rivets, or adhesive.

With respect to the core type and the way the core supports the skins, sandwich structures can be divided into the following groups: homogeneously supported, locally supported, regionally supported, unidirectionally supported, bidirectionally supported. The latter group is represented by honeycomb structure which, due to an optimal performance-to-weight ratio, is typically used in most demanding applications including aerospace.

== Properties of sandwich structures ==
The strength of the composite material is dependent largely on two factors:

1. The outer skins: If the sandwich is supported on both sides, and then stressed by means of a downward force in the middle of the beam, then the bending moment will introduce shear forces in the material. The shear forces put the bottom skin in tension and the top skin in compression. The core material spaces these two skins apart. The thicker the core material the stronger the composite. This principle works in much the same way as an I-beam does.
2. The interface between the core and the skin: Because the shear stresses in the composite material change rapidly between the core and the skin, the adhesive layer also sees some degree of shear force. If the adhesive bond between the two layers is too weak, then the most probable result will be delamination. The failure of the interface between the skin and core is critical and the most common damage mode. The propensity of this damage to propagate through the interface or dive into the skin or core is governed by the shear component.

== Application of sandwich structures ==
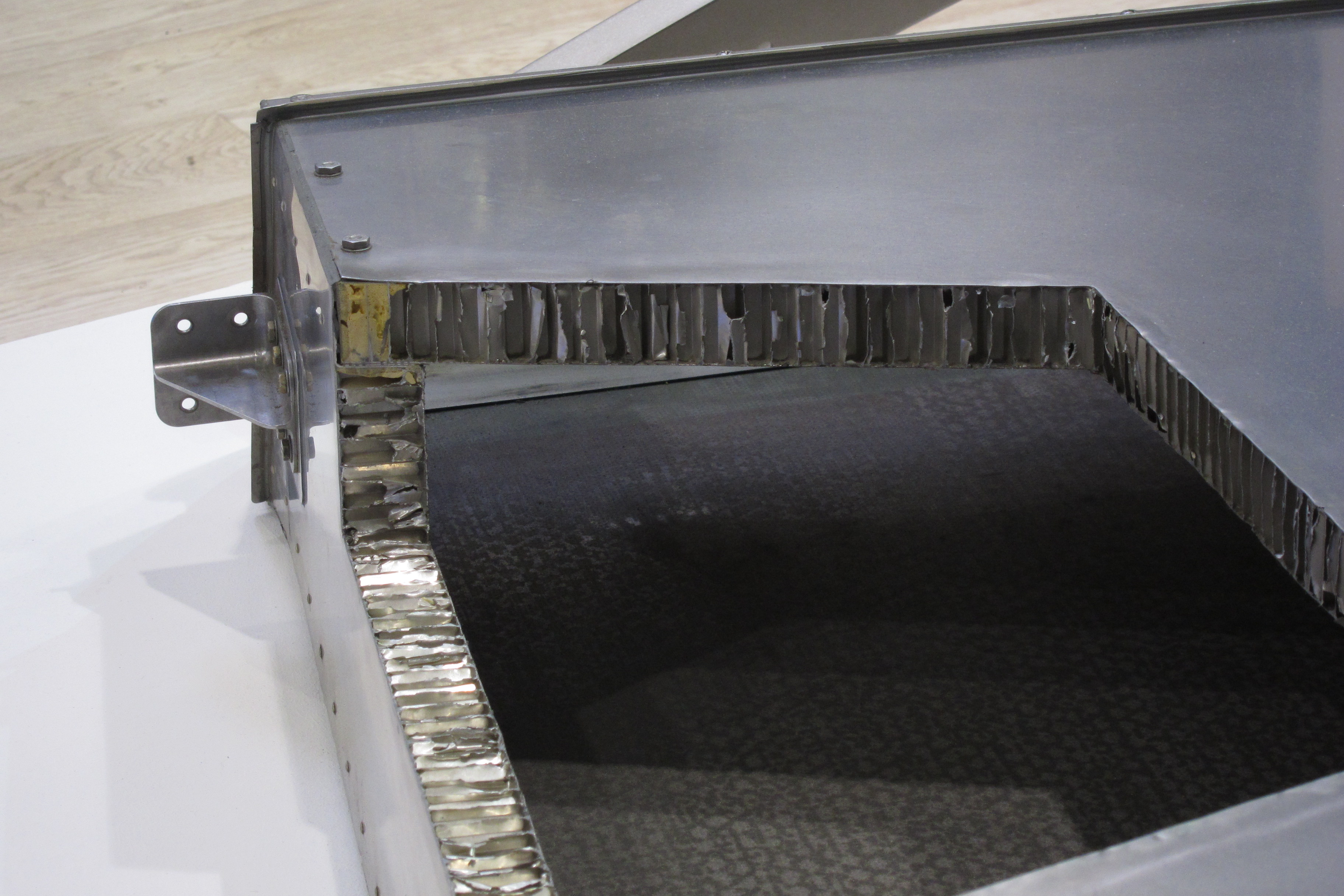
The composite honeycomb structure of a helicopter nozzle

Sandwich structures can be widely used in sandwich panels, with different types such as FRP sandwich panel, aluminium composite panel, etc. FRP polyester-reinforced composite honeycomb panel (sandwich panel) is made of polyester-reinforced plastic, multi-axial high-strength glass fiber, and PP honeycomb panel in a special antiskid tread-pattern mold through the process of constant temperature vacuum adsorption and agglutination and solidification.

== Theory ==
Sandwich theory describes the behaviour of a beam, plate, or shell which consists of three layers – two face sheets and one core. The most commonly used sandwich theory is linear and is an extension of first-order beam theory. Linear local buckling sandwich theory is of importance for the design and analysis of sandwich plates or sandwich panels, which are of use in building construction, vehicle construction, airplane construction, and refrigeration engineering.

== See also ==
- Sandwich panel
- Sandwich plate system
- Composite honeycomb
- Honeycomb Structures
- Sandwich theory
- Flitch beam
- Bending
- Beam theory
- Composite material
- Hill yield criteria
- Timoshenko beam theory
- Plate theory
