= Hosford yield criterion =

The Hosford yield criterion is a function that is used to determine whether a material has undergone plastic yielding under the action of stress.

== Hosford yield criterion for isotropic plasticity ==
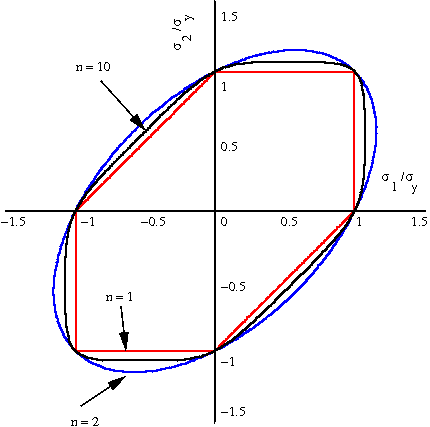
The plane stress, isotropic, Hosford yield surface for three values of n

The Hosford yield criterion for isotropic materials is a generalization of the von Mises yield criterion. It has the form

$$\tfrac{1}{2}|\sigma_2-\sigma_3|^n + \tfrac{1}{2}|\sigma_3-\sigma_1|^n + \tfrac{1}{2}|\sigma_1-\sigma_2|^n = \sigma_y^n \,$$

where $\sigma_i$, i=1,2,3 are the principal stresses, $n$ is a material-dependent exponent and $\sigma_y$ is the yield stress in uniaxial tension/compression.

Alternatively, the yield criterion may be written as

$$\sigma_y = \left(\tfrac{1}{2}|\sigma_2-\sigma_3|^n + \tfrac{1}{2}|\sigma_3-\sigma_1|^n + \tfrac{1}{2}|\sigma_1-\sigma_2|^n\right)^{1/n} \,.$$

This expression has the form of an L^{p} norm which is defined as

$$\ \|x\|_p=\left(|x_1|^p+|x_2|^p+\cdots+|x_n|^p\right)^{1/p} \,.$$

When $p = \infty$, the we get the L^{∞} norm,

$\ \|x\|_\infty=\max \left\{|x_1|, |x_2|, \ldots, |x_n|\right\}$. Comparing this with the Hosford criterion

indicates that if n = ∞, we have

$$(\sigma_y)_{n\rightarrow\infty} = \max \left(|\sigma_2-\sigma_3|, |\sigma_3-\sigma_1|,|\sigma_1-\sigma_2|\right) \,.$$

This is identical to the Tresca yield criterion.

Therefore, when n = 1 or n goes to infinity the Hosford criterion reduces to the Tresca yield criterion. When n = 2 the Hosford criterion reduces to the von Mises yield criterion.

Note that the exponent n does not need to be an integer.

=== Hosford yield criterion for plane stress ===
For the practically important situation of plane stress, the Hosford yield criterion takes the form

$$\cfrac{1}{2}\left(|\sigma_1|^n + |\sigma_2|^n\right) + \cfrac{1}{2}|\sigma_1-\sigma_2|^n = \sigma_y^n \,$$

A plot of the yield locus in plane stress for various values of the exponent $n \ge 1$ is shown in the adjacent figure.

== Logan-Hosford yield criterion for anisotropic plasticity ==
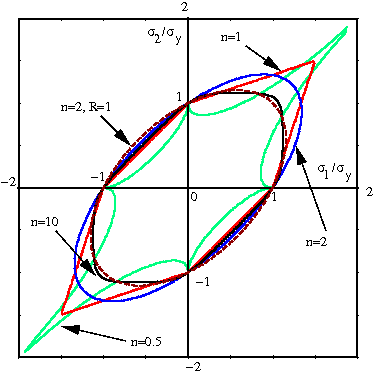
The plane stress, anisotropic, Hosford yield surface for four values of n and R=2.0

The Logan-Hosford yield criterion for anisotropic plasticity is similar to Hill's generalized yield criterion and has the form

$$F|\sigma_2-\sigma_3|^n + G|\sigma_3-\sigma_1|^n + H|\sigma_1-\sigma_2|^n = 1 \,$$

where F,G,H are constants, $\sigma_i$ are the principal stresses, and the exponent n depends on the type of crystal (bcc, fcc, hcp, etc.) and has a value much greater than 2. Accepted values of $n$ are 6 for bcc materials and 8 for fcc materials.

Though the form is similar to Hill's generalized yield criterion, the exponent n is independent of the R-value unlike the Hill's criterion.

=== Logan-Hosford criterion in plane stress ===
Under plane stress conditions, the Logan-Hosford criterion can be expressed as

$$\cfrac{1}{1+R} (|\sigma_1|^n + |\sigma_2|^n) + \cfrac{R}{1+R} |\sigma_1-\sigma_2|^n = \sigma_y^n$$

where $R$ is the R-value and $\sigma_y$ is the yield stress in uniaxial tension/compression. For a derivation of this relation see Hill's yield criteria for plane stress. A plot of the yield locus for the anisotropic Hosford criterion is shown in the adjacent figure. For values of $n$ that are less than 2, the yield locus exhibits corners and such values are not recommended.

== See also ==
- Yield surface
- Yield (engineering)
- Plasticity (physics)
- Stress (physics)
