= Diasec =

Diasec is the registered trademark for the original method of face-mounting prints, such as photographs on acrylic sheets. The process was invented by Heinz Sovilla-Brulhart in 1969.

According to the trademark's website, the colors are "more brilliant and the image sharper than with standard glass in a picture frame" because of the light penetration and refraction of clear acrylic compared to normal glass. A Diasec mount is usually of a high gloss finish. Because the print is glued to the acrylic glazing, the result is a completely flat mount of the image.

Diasec also contains (UV) light inhibitors to help protect the image from ultraviolet (UV) light.

== Process ==
The process bonds the print without air bubbles because it uses liquid gel instead of a transparent adhesive film. The image is face-mounted and stuck to the acrylic glass with a special sealant. Normally, the mounted print is then placed on a carrier sheet. This is usually Aluminum. If the print has to be backlit, translucent materials such as acrylic can be used instead. The Diasec gel is neutral curing and has an inbuilt ultraviolet filter. It contains no plasticizers and is resistant to fungicidal, bacterial agents, and airborne pollutants. After curing, the whole airtight panel remains chemically inert and stable. The finished product remains flexible, enabling it to withstand changes in temperature and humidity, which affect works on paper. However, the process is irreversible and if the acrylic glass is damaged, there is no way to salvage the print.

Nowadays, new acrylic products can include anti-scratch surface coatings that prevent damage to these pieces of art.

== Uses ==
The Diasec process is mostly used by artists and photographers to present their artwork. Andreas Gursky mounted "99 Cent II Diptychon", the most expensive photograph ever, on acrylic glass, probably with the Diasec process.

Diasec panels are backed with aluminum or dibond, reinforcing the rigidity of the finished picture and sealing the artwork from both sides. The Aluminium back also enables the attachment of sub-frames that allow the artwork to hang on the wall without a traditional picture frame.

Diasec samples that were made in the 1970s show a negligible color shift, the whites are still pure and there is no evidence of acid erosion visible.

== Diasec patent ==
In the past, the process was patented by the Swiss company Alrane Inventing AG to generate a brand name for the official licensee. To this day that same process is only available to official license holders. The diasec patent has expired, and a surrogate process is used by some mounting studios. However, they cannot use the genuine Diasec ingredients or machinery.

The Dutch company, "Diasec Support BV", was started in 2009 to support the Swiss licensor by offering training and custom-made machines. Special fluids needed for the Diasec process are only available from the Swiss originators.
