= Hill yield criterion =

Plastic deformation descriptor

The Hill yield criterion developed by Rodney Hill, is one of several yield criteria for describing anisotropic plastic deformations. The earliest version was a straightforward extension of the von Mises yield criterion and had a quadratic form. This model was later generalized by allowing for an exponent m. Variations of these criteria are in wide use for metals, polymers, and certain composites.

== Quadratic Hill yield criterion ==
The quadratic Hill yield criterion has the form : $F(\sigma_{22}-\sigma_{33})^2 + G(\sigma_{33}-\sigma_{11})^2 + H(\sigma_{11}-\sigma_{22})^2 + 2L\sigma_{23}^2 + 2M\sigma_{31}^2 + 2N\sigma_{12}^2 = 1 ~.$ Here F, G, H, L, M, N are constants that have to be determined experimentally and $\sigma_{ij}$ are the stresses. The quadratic Hill yield criterion depends only on the deviatoric stresses and is pressure independent. It predicts the same yield stress in tension and in compression.

=== Expressions for F, G, H, L, M, N ===
If the axes of material anisotropy are assumed to be orthogonal, we can write

$$(G + H)~(\sigma_1^y)^2 = 1 ~;~~ (F + H)~(\sigma_2^y)^2 = 1 ~;~~ (F + G)~(\sigma_3^y)^2 = 1$$

where $\sigma_1^y, \sigma_2^y, \sigma_3^y$ are the normal yield stresses with respect to the axes of anisotropy. Therefore, we have

$$F = \cfrac{1}{2}\left[\cfrac{1}{(\sigma_2^y)^2} + \cfrac{1}{(\sigma_3^y)^2} - \cfrac{1}{(\sigma_1^y)^2}\right]$$
$$G = \cfrac{1}{2}\left[\cfrac{1}{(\sigma_3^y)^2} + \cfrac{1}{(\sigma_1^y)^2} - \cfrac{1}{(\sigma_2^y)^2}\right]$$
$$H = \cfrac{1}{2}\left[\cfrac{1}{(\sigma_1^y)^2} + \cfrac{1}{(\sigma_2^y)^2} - \cfrac{1}{(\sigma_3^y)^2}\right]$$

Similarly, if $\tau_{12}^y, \tau_{23}^y, \tau_{31}^y$ are the yield stresses in shear (with respect to the axes of anisotropy), we have

$$L = \cfrac{1}{2~(\tau_{23}^y)^2} ~;~~ M = \cfrac{1}{2~(\tau_{31}^y)^2} ~;~~ N = \cfrac{1}{2~(\tau_{12}^y)^2}$$

=== Quadratic Hill yield criterion for plane stress ===
The quadratic Hill yield criterion for thin rolled plates (plane stress conditions) can be expressed as

$$\sigma_1^2 + \cfrac{R_0~(1+R_{90})}{R_{90}~(1+R_0)}~\sigma_2^2 - \cfrac{2~R_0}{1+R_0}~\sigma_1\sigma_2 = (\sigma_1^y)^2$$

where the principal stresses $\sigma_1, \sigma_2$ are assumed to be aligned with the axes of anisotropy with $\sigma_1$ in the rolling direction and $\sigma_2$ perpendicular to the rolling direction, $\sigma_3 = 0$, $R_0$ is the R-value in the rolling direction, and $R_{90}$ is the R-value perpendicular to the rolling direction.

For the special case of transverse isotropy we have $R=R_0 = R_{90}$ and we get

$$\sigma_1^2 + \sigma_2- \cfrac{2~R}{1+R}~\sigma_1\sigma_2 = (\sigma_1^y)^2$$

Derivation of Hill's criterion for plane stress
For the situation where the principal stresses are aligned with the directions of anisotropy we have

$$f := F(\sigma_2-\sigma_3)^2 + G(\sigma_3-\sigma_1)^2 + H(\sigma_1-\sigma_2)^2 - 1 = 0 \,$$

where $\sigma_1, \sigma_2, \sigma_3$ are the principal stresses. If we assume an associated flow rule we have

$$\dot{\varepsilon}^p_i = \dot{\lambda}~\cfrac{\partial f}{\partial \sigma_i} \qquad \implies \qquad
\cfrac{d\varepsilon^p_i}{d\lambda} = \cfrac{\partial f}{\partial \sigma_i} ~.$$

This implies that

$$\begin{align}
\cfrac{d\varepsilon^p_1}{d\lambda} &= 2(G+H)\sigma_1 - 2H\sigma_2 - 2G\sigma_3 \\
\cfrac{d\varepsilon^p_2}{d\lambda} &= 2(F+H)\sigma_2 - 2H\sigma_1 - 2F\sigma_3 \\
\cfrac{d\varepsilon^p_3}{d\lambda} &= 2(F+G)\sigma_3 - 2G\sigma_1 - 2F\sigma_2 ~.
\end{align}$$

For plane stress $\sigma_3 = 0$, which gives

$$\begin{align}
\cfrac{d\varepsilon^p_1}{d\lambda} &= 2(G+H)\sigma_1 - 2H\sigma_2\\
\cfrac{d\varepsilon^p_2}{d\lambda} &= 2(F+H)\sigma_2 - 2H\sigma_1\\
\cfrac{d\varepsilon^p_3}{d\lambda} &= - 2G\sigma_1 - 2F\sigma_2 ~.
\end{align}$$

The R-value $R_0$ is defined as the ratio of the in-plane and out-of-plane plastic strains under uniaxial stress $\sigma_1$. The quantity $R_{90}$ is the plastic strain ratio under uniaxial stress $\sigma_2$. Therefore, we have

$$R_0 = \cfrac{d\varepsilon^p_2}{d\varepsilon^p_3} = \cfrac{H}{G} ~;~~
R_{90} = \cfrac{d\varepsilon^p_1}{d\varepsilon^p_3} = \cfrac{H}{F} ~.$$

Then, using $H=R_0 G$ and $\sigma_3=0$, the yield condition can be written as

$$f := F \sigma_2^2 + G \sigma_1^2 + R_0 G(\sigma_1-\sigma_2)^2 - 1 = 0 \,$$

which in turn may be expressed as

$$\sigma_1^2 + \cfrac{F+R_0 G}{G(1+R_0)}~\sigma_2^2 - \cfrac{2R_0}{1+R_0}~\sigma_1\sigma_2 = \cfrac{1}{(1+R_0)G}~.$$

This is of the same form as the required expression. All we have to do is to express $F,G$ in terms of $\sigma_1^y$. Recall that,

$$\begin{align}
F & = \cfrac{1}{2}\left[\cfrac{1}{(\sigma_2^y)^2} + \cfrac{1}{(\sigma_3^y)^2} - \cfrac{1}{(\sigma_1^y)^2}
\right] \\
G & = \cfrac{1}{2}\left[\cfrac{1}{(\sigma_3^y)^2} + \cfrac{1}{(\sigma_1^y)^2} - \cfrac{1}{(\sigma_2^y)^2}
\right] \\
H & = \cfrac{1}{2}\left[\cfrac{1}{(\sigma_1^y)^2} + \cfrac{1}{(\sigma_2^y)^2} - \cfrac{1}{(\sigma_3^y)^2}
\right]
\end{align}$$

We can use these to obtain

$$\begin{align}
R_0 = \cfrac{H}{G} & \implies
(1+R_0)\cfrac{1}{(\sigma_3^y)^2} - (1+R_0)\cfrac{1}{(\sigma_2^y)^2} = (1-R_0)\cfrac{1}{(\sigma_1^y)^2} \\
R_{90} = \cfrac{H}{F} & \implies
(1+R_{90})\cfrac{1}{(\sigma_3^y)^2} - (1-R_{90})\cfrac{1}{(\sigma_2^y)^2} = (1+R_{90})\cfrac{1}{(\sigma_1^y)^2}
\end{align}$$

Solving for $\cfrac{1}{(\sigma_3^y)^2}, \cfrac{1}{(\sigma_2^y)^2}$ gives us

$$\cfrac{1}{(\sigma_3^y)^2} = \cfrac{R_0+R_{90}}{(1+R_0)~R_{90}}~\cfrac{1}{(\sigma_1^y)^2} ~;~~
\cfrac{1}{(\sigma_2^y)^2} = \cfrac{R_0(1+R_{90})}{(1+R_0)~R_{90}}~\cfrac{1}{(\sigma_1^y)^2}$$

Plugging back into the expressions for $F,G$ leads to

$$F = \cfrac{R_0}{(1+R_0)~R_{90}}~\cfrac{1}{(\sigma_1^y)^2} ~;~~
G = \cfrac{1}{1+R_0}~\cfrac{1}{(\sigma_1^y)^2}$$

which implies that

$$\cfrac{1}{G(1+R_0)} = (\sigma_1^y)^2 ~;~~ \cfrac{F+R_0 G}{G(1+R_0)} = \cfrac{R_0(1+R_{90})}{R_{90}(1+R_0)} ~.$$

Therefore, the plane stress form of the quadratic Hill yield criterion can be expressed as

$$\sigma_1^2 + \cfrac{R_0~(1+R_{90})}{R_{90}~(1+R_0)}~\sigma_2^2 - \cfrac{2~R_0}{1+R_0}~\sigma_1\sigma_2 = (\sigma_1^y)^2$$

== Generalized Hill yield criterion ==
The generalized Hill yield criterion has the form

$$\begin{align}
F|\sigma_{2}-\sigma_{3}|^m & + G|\sigma_{3}-\sigma_{1}|^m + H|\sigma_{1}-\sigma_{2}|^m + L|2\sigma_1 - \sigma_2 - \sigma_3|^m \\
& + M|2\sigma_2 - \sigma_3 - \sigma_1|^m + N|2\sigma_3 - \sigma_1 - \sigma_2|^m = \sigma_y^m ~.
\end{align}$$

where $\sigma_i$ are the principal stresses (which are aligned with the directions of anisotropy), $\sigma_y$ is the yield stress, and F, G, H, L, M, N are constants. The value of m is determined by the degree of anisotropy of the material and must be greater than 1 to ensure convexity of the yield surface.

=== Generalized Hill yield criterion for anisotropic material ===
For transversely isotropic materials with $1-2$ being the plane of symmetry, the generalized Hill yield criterion reduces to (with $F=G$ and $L=M$)

$$\begin{align}
f := & F|\sigma_2-\sigma_3|^m + G|\sigma_3-\sigma_1|^m + H|\sigma_1-\sigma_2|^m + L|2\sigma_1 - \sigma_2 - \sigma_3|^m \\
& + L|2\sigma_2-\sigma_3-\sigma_1|^m + N|2\sigma_3-\sigma_1-\sigma_2|^m - \sigma_y^m \le 0
\end{align}$$

The R-value or Lankford coefficient can be determined by considering the situation where $\sigma_1 > (\sigma_2 = \sigma_3 = 0)$. The R-value is then given by

$$R = \cfrac{(2^{m-1}+2) L - N + H}{(2^{m-1} - 1) L + 2 N + F} ~.$$

Under plane stress conditions and with some assumptions, the generalized Hill criterion can take several forms.

- Case 1: $L = 0, H = 0.$

$$f:= \cfrac{1+2R}{1+R}(|\sigma_1|^m + |\sigma_2|^m) - \cfrac{R}{1+R} |\sigma_1 + \sigma_2|^m - \sigma_y^m \le 0$$

- Case 2: $N = 0, F = 0.$

$$f:= \cfrac{2^{m-1}(1-R)+(R+2)}{(1-2^{m-1})(1+R)}|\sigma_1 -\sigma_2|^m - \cfrac{1}{(1-2^{m-1})(1+R)} (|2\sigma_1 - \sigma_2|^m + |2\sigma_2-\sigma_1|^m)- \sigma_y^m \le 0$$

- Case 3: $N = 0, H = 0.$

$$f:= \cfrac{2^{m-1}(1-R)+(R+2)}{(2+2^{m-1})(1+R)}(|\sigma_1|^m -|\sigma_2|^m) + \cfrac{R}{(2+2^{m-1})(1+R)} (|2\sigma_1 - \sigma_2|^m + |2\sigma_2-\sigma_1|^m)- \sigma_y^m \le 0$$

- Case 4: $L = 0, F = 0.$

$$f:= \cfrac{1+2R}{2(1+R)}|\sigma_1 - \sigma_2|^m + \cfrac{1}{2(1+R)} |\sigma_1 + \sigma_2|^m - \sigma_y^m \le 0$$

- Case 5: $L = 0, N = 0.$. This is the Hosford yield criterion.

$$f := \cfrac{1}{1+R}(|\sigma_1|^m + |\sigma_2|^m) + \cfrac{R}{1+R}|\sigma_1-\sigma_2|^m - \sigma_y^m \le 0$$
Care must be exercised in using these forms of the generalized Hill yield criterion because the yield surfaces become concave (sometimes even unbounded) for certain combinations of $R$ and $m$.

== Hill 1993 yield criterion ==
In 1993, Hill proposed another yield criterion for plane stress problems with planar anisotropy. The Hill93 criterion has the form

$$\left(\cfrac{\sigma_1}{\sigma_0}\right)^2 + \left(\cfrac{\sigma_2}{\sigma_{90}}\right)^2 + \left[ (p + q - c) - \cfrac{p\sigma_1+q\sigma_2}{\sigma_b}\right]\left(\cfrac{\sigma_1\sigma_2}{\sigma_0\sigma_{90}}\right) =  1$$

where $\sigma_0$ is the uniaxial tensile yield stress in the rolling direction, $\sigma_{90}$ is the uniaxial tensile yield stress in the direction normal to the rolling direction, $\sigma_b$ is the yield stress under uniform biaxial tension, and $c, p, q$ are parameters defined as

$$\begin{align}
c & = \cfrac{\sigma_0}{\sigma_{90}} + \cfrac{\sigma_{90}}{\sigma_0} - \cfrac{\sigma_0\sigma_{90}}{\sigma_b^2} \\
\left(\cfrac{1}{\sigma_0}+\cfrac{1}{\sigma_{90}}-\cfrac{1}{\sigma_b}\right)~p & =
\cfrac{2 R_0 (\sigma_b-\sigma_{90})}{(1+R_0)\sigma_0^2} - \cfrac{2 R_{90} \sigma_b}{(1+R_{90})\sigma_{90}^2} + \cfrac{c}{\sigma_0} \\
\left(\cfrac{1}{\sigma_0}+\cfrac{1}{\sigma_{90}}-\cfrac{1}{\sigma_b}\right)~q & =
\cfrac{2 R_{90} (\sigma_b-\sigma_{0})}{(1+R_{90})\sigma_{90}^2} - \cfrac{2 R_{0} \sigma_b}{(1+R_{0})\sigma_{0}^2} + \cfrac{c}{\sigma_{90}}
\end{align}$$

and $R_0$ is the R-value for uniaxial tension in the rolling direction, and $R_{90}$ is the R-value for uniaxial tension in the in-plane direction perpendicular to the rolling direction.

== Extensions of Hill's yield criterion ==
The original versions of Hill's yield criterion were designed for material that did not have pressure-dependent yield surfaces which are needed to model polymers and foams.

=== The Caddell–Raghava–Atkins yield criterion ===
An extension that allows for pressure dependence is Caddell–Raghava–Atkins (CRA) model which has the form

$$F (\sigma_{22}-\sigma_{33})^2 + G (\sigma_{33}-\sigma_{11})^2 + H (\sigma_{11}-\sigma_{22})^2 + 2 L \sigma_{23}^2 + 2 M \sigma_{31}^2 + 2 N\sigma_{12}^2 + I \sigma_{11} + J \sigma_{22} + K \sigma_{33} = 1~.$$

=== The Deshpande–Fleck–Ashby yield criterion ===
Another pressure-dependent extension of Hill's quadratic yield criterion which has a form similar to the Bresler Pister yield criterion is the Deshpande, Fleck and Ashby (DFA) yield criterion for honeycomb structures (used in sandwich composite construction). This yield criterion has the form

$$F (\sigma_{22}-\sigma_{33})^2 + G (\sigma_{33}-\sigma_{11})^2 + H (\sigma_{11}-\sigma_{22})^2 + 2 L \sigma_{23}^2 + 2 M \sigma_{31}^2 + 2 N\sigma_{12}^2 + K (\sigma_{11} + \sigma_{22} + \sigma_{33})^2 = 1~.$$

== See also ==
- Logan-Hosford yield criterion for anisotropic plasticity
