= Stephen Kennedy (engineer) =

Stephen Kennedy (born 1956), Technical Director of Intelligent Engineering, is responsible for the development of Sandwich Plate System (SPS) technology and has a distinguished career in applied engineering research.

He was previously a professor in the Department of Civil and Environmental Engineering at Carleton University (Ottawa) specializing in the design and behaviour of steel structures including buildings, bridges and ships. His work involved research grants and contracts from the Natural Science and Engineering Research Council of Canada, Transport Canada, Canadian Coast Guard, Ship Structure Committee, United States Coast Guard, Fleet Technology Inc., and Marine Industries Limited.

During this time, twenty-two graduate students completed their theses under his supervision on topics that included: the inelastic behaviour of ice breaker hulls; an investigation of crack propagation for steel weldments in ship structures; development of design equations for web crippling (incorporated in Canadian Standards for steel bridges and buildings); development of integrated analysis design software for steel buildings; and the development of composite structural laminate plates for ships.

Kennedy has graduate degrees in structural engineering from the University of Alberta.

== Selected writings ==
- Kennedy, Stephen J, "Sandwich Plate System Risers For Stadia" (PDF), SSRC 2002 Annual Stability Conference
- Kennedy, Stephen J, "An Innovative 'No Hot Work' Approach to Hull Repair on In-Service FPSOs Using Sandwich Plate System Overlay" (PDF), Offshore Technology Conference Houston, Texas - May 2003
