= Lankford coefficient =

Measure of the plastic anisotropy of a rolled sheet metal

The Lankford coefficient (also called Lankford value, R-value, or plastic strain ratio) is a measure of the plastic anisotropy of a rolled sheet metal. This scalar quantity is used extensively as an indicator of the formability of recrystallized low-carbon steel sheets.

== Definition ==
If $x$ and $y$ are the coordinate directions in the plane of rolling and $z$ is the thickness direction, then the R-value is given by

$$R = \cfrac{\epsilon^p_{\mathrm{x}}}{\epsilon^p_{\mathrm{z}}}$$

where $\epsilon^p_{\mathrm{x}}$ is the in-plane plastic strain, transverse to the loading direction, and $\epsilon^p_{\mathrm{z}}$ is the plastic strain through-the-thickness.

More recent studies have shown that the R-value of a material can depend strongly on the strain even at small strains . In practice, the $R$ value is usually measured at 20% elongation in a tensile test.

For sheet metals, the $R$ values are usually determined for three different directions of loading in-plane ($0^{\circ}, 45^{\circ}, 90^{\circ}$ to the rolling direction) and the normal R-value is taken to be the average

$$R = \cfrac{1}{4}\left(R_0 + 2~R_{45} + R_{90}\right) ~.$$

The planar anisotropy coefficient or planar R-value is a measure of the variation of $R$ with angle from the rolling direction. This quantity is defined as

$$R_p = \cfrac{1}{2}\left(R_0 - 2~R_{45} + R_{90}\right) ~.$$

== Anisotropy of steel sheets ==
Generally, the Lankford value of cold rolled steel sheet acting for deep-drawability shows heavy orientation, and such deep-drawability is characterized by $R$. However, in the actual press-working, the deep-drawability of steel sheets cannot be determined only by the value of $R$ and the measure of planar anisotropy, $R_p$ is more appropriate.

In an ordinary cold rolled steel, $R_{90}$ is the highest, and $R_{45}$ is the lowest. Experience shows that even if $R_{45}$ is close to 1, $R_0$ and $R_{90}$ can be quite high leading to a high average value of $R$. In such cases, any press-forming process design on the basis of $R_{45}$ does not lead to an improvement in deep-drawability.

== See also ==
- Yield surface
