= Sandwich plate system =

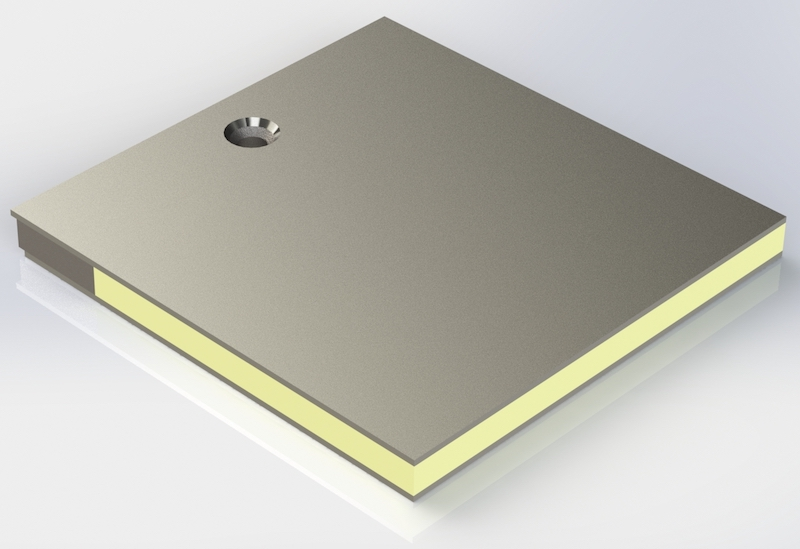
Sandwich Plate System, basic configuration of two metal faces with Elastomer core

Sandwich Plate System (SPS) is the name of a patented structural composite material. It offers an alternative to traditional stiffened steel and reinforced concrete in various heavy engineering projects. An SPS element typically consists of two metal face plates (usually steel, but can also be high tensile steel, stainless steel, or aluminium) bonded together by a solid, continuous core of polyurethane elastomer. This elastomer core is injected as a two-part thermosetting liquid into the cavity between the metal plates, which solidifies to create a strong bond.

== History ==
SPS was developed by Stephen Kennedy following primary research in the field of ice-strengthened structures at Carleton University in Ottawa, Ontario, Canada and first patented in 1996.

== Structure and composition ==
An SPS element is constructed from two metal face plates that are mechanically and chemically bonded to a solid core of polyurethane elastomer. The metal plates are typically made of steel, but high tensile steel, stainless steel, or aluminium can also be used depending on the specific application requirements. The elastomer core, known as Elastocore, is manufactured by chemical manufacturer BASF, and is a two-part thermosetting liquid that is injected into the space between the plates, which then cures to form a solid, continuous bond. This composite structure allows for a high stiffness-to-weight ratio due to the strength of the face plates with the compliant nature of the core.

For applications involving the SPS overlay technique, where SPS is used to reinforce or reinstate existing structures, the existing structure serves as one of the metal face plates. A new steel plate is added, and the elastomer is injected into the cavity formed between the old and new plates. This method often eliminates the need for extensive cutting and welding, simplifying repairs and reducing downtime.

== Uses and limitations ==
SPS technology provides an exceptional strength-to-weight ratio, being lighter than conventional stiffened steel or reinforced concrete for comparable strength, leading to weight reduction and easier handling during construction. The elastomer core effectively distributes loads over a larger area, reducing stress concentrations and preventing buckling that can occur in stiffened steel plates. They also exhibit superior fatigue performance and are less prone to crack formation due to less welding required compared to stiffened steel. The elastomer core effectively absorbs impact energy and dampens vibrations, offering improved performance in dynamic loading conditions. SPS is used globally in various engineered structures including maritime ships, offshore assets, buildings, stadiums and arenas, bridges and other special applications.
