= La Cabrera Tunnel =

Tunnel in Venezuela

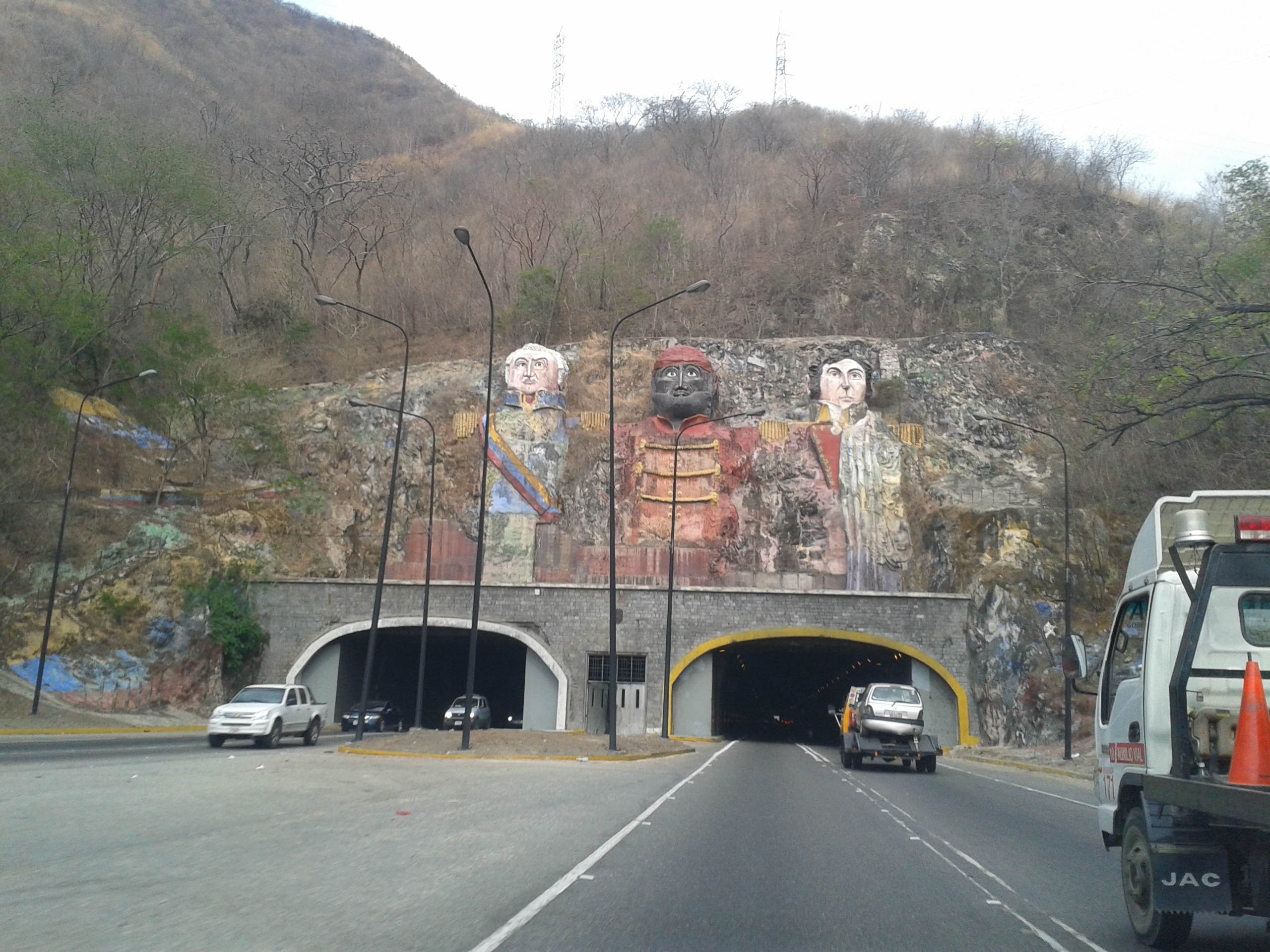
- Interactive map of La Cabrera Tunnel

Overview
- Official name: Túnel de La Cabrera
- Other name: La Cabrera bridge-tunnel
- Coordinates: 10.270278°N 67.664444°W

Operation
- Opened: 1960

The La Cabrera Tunnel (Spanish: Túnel de La Cabrera), also known as the La Cabrera bridge-tunnel, is a tunnel and viaduct in Venezuela which lies within Aragua State and connects it with Carabobo State. It was built in the late 1950s using the New Austrian Tunnelling method. It was the first application by Ladislaus von Rabcewicz of systematic rock bolt and shotcrete support in a highway tunnel.

In July 2016, it was reported that the viaduct which leads to the tunnel was in danger of collapse and that multiple vehicles had fallen off due to a lack of guardrails combined with swerving to avoid potholes.
