= Franz Pacher =

Austrian engineer (1919–2018)

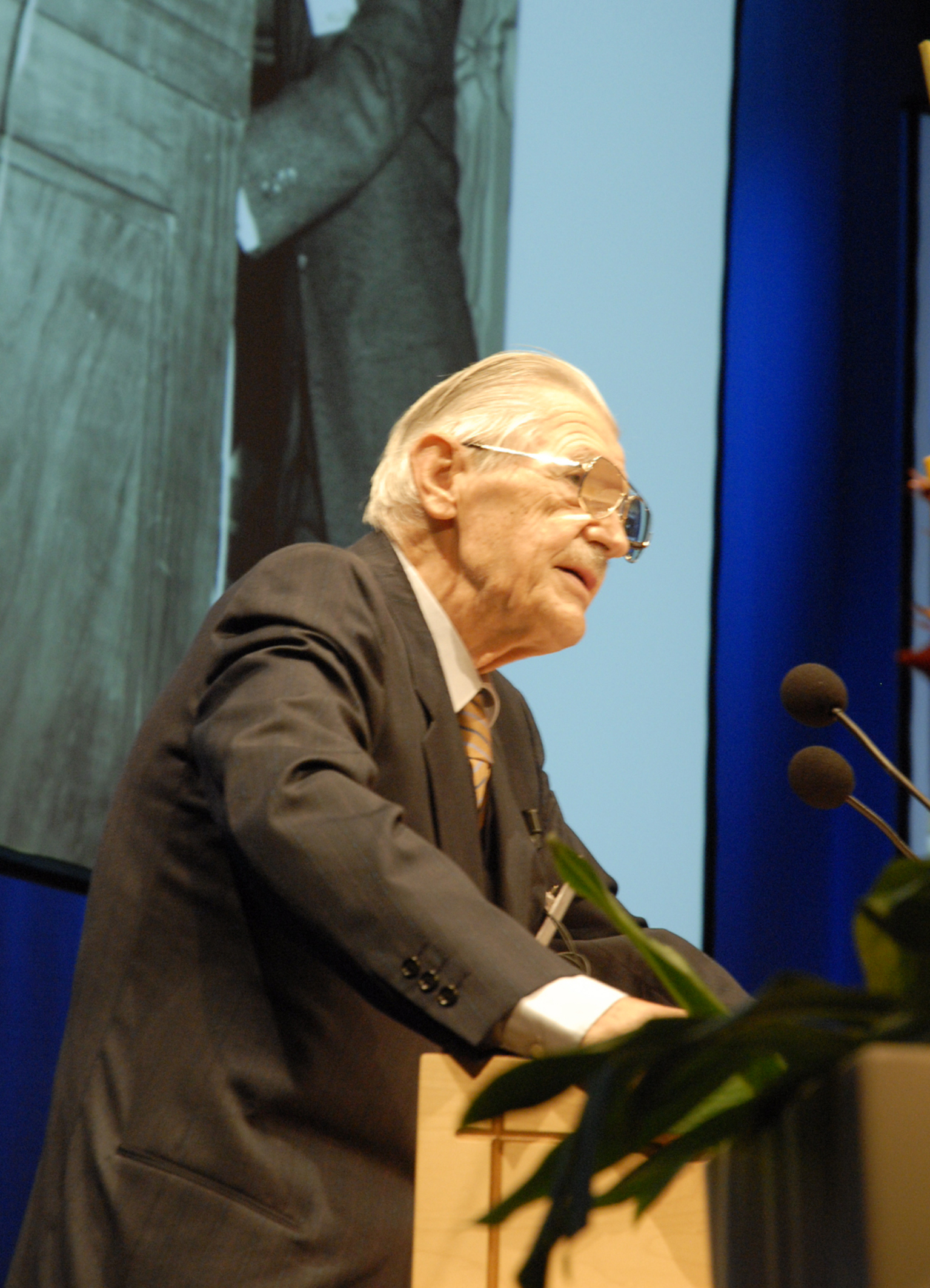
Franz Pacher at the Geomechanik Kolloquium 2008 in Salzburg, Austria

Franz Pacher (28 April 1919 in Prostřední Suchá, present-day Czech Republic – 3 March 2018 in Salzburg, Austria) was an Austrian civil engineer and a pioneer of modern tunneling. He is one of three men who are considered to be the chief developers of the new Austrian tunneling method (NATM).

During the later years of his career, he was involved in nearly 90% of all tunnel constructions in Austria.

== Early life and education ==
After graduating from the Upper Secondary School in Graz, Franz Pacher studied civil engineering at the Technical University of Graz, from which he graduated in 1943.

== Career ==
He remained at the Technical University of Graz as a research assistant in the field of hydraulic engineering until 1945. From 1946 to 1952, he worked as a design engineer and site manager on power plant construction sites. During this period he had his first encounters with rock mechanics and tunneling.

In 1952 he went to work for Leopold Müller’s firm, the Engineering Office for Geotechnics and Tunnel Construction. In 1957 he became Müller’s partner, and in 1966 he became sole manager of the business. During their years together, Pacher and Müller made major advances in rock engineering and helped usher in the era of modern tunneling in the mid-1960s.

In the years prior to 1975, his collaboration with Professor Ladislaus von Rabcewicz was crucial to the development of tunneling construction and design.

In 1983, Franz Pacher converted his rock mechanics and tunneling firm into the Ingenieurgemeinschaft für Geotechnik und Tunnelbau (IGT), or Engineering Group for Geotechnics and Tunneling Construction. He finally retired in 1988.

=== Projects ===
Pacher worked on the Schwaikheim Tunnel on the Waiblingen-Schwäbisch Hall-Hessental railway line, the first tunnel in Germany to be built according to the principles of shotcrete construction. He was also involved in the planning of the Munich and Vienna subways, and served as a consultant during their construction.

Between 1968 and 1975, he worked on the Tauern Road Tunnel and the nearby Katschberg Tunnel in the state of Salzburg. From 1981 to 1985, he was in charge of tunnel construction of the new German railway line between Hannover and Würzburg. This included work on the Landrücken Tunnel. He was also involved in such projects as the construction of the Hirzmannsperre power plant in Styria, the Dürrach dam in Tyrol, and the turbine plant for the textile works in Reutte.

While in the employ of Leopold Müller, Pacher also helped monitor the anchoring of the Vajont dam.

=== Contributions ===
Pacher was responsible for major advances in fundamental research, such as the definition of planar and volumetric proportions of discontinuities and the ground reaction curve. In a 1964 publication, he introduced the Pacher-Fenner curve, a method for prediction and graphical representation of the interaction between ground pressure and tunnel support loading. This led in turn to the development of the convergence-confinement method. In 2009 Pacher created a diagram showing the time-dependency of both ground pressure and deformation.

=== Teaching ===
From 1966 to 1987, Pacher lectured on rock mechanics at the Technical University of Munich. From 1979 to 1983, he was a lecturer in Applied Rock mechanics at the Vienna University of Technology.

=== Other professional activities ===
From 1975 to 1987, Pacher headed the Working Committee on Tunneling at the Research Association for Transport and Roads. Pacher delivered many lectures and wrote numerous papers for professional journals.

== Memberships ==
From 1969 to 1999, he was a member of the Subcommittee on Dam Surveillance at the Austrian Federal Ministry of Agriculture, Forestry, Environment and Water Management. From 1966 to 1988, he served as an expert in rock mechanics on the reservoir commission at the Austrian Federal Ministry of Agriculture and Forestry, Environment and Water Management.

After 1984, he was a member of the Road Research Advisory Board at the Austrian Federal Ministry of Economics. He was a founding member of the International Society for Rock Mechanics (ISRM) in 1962 and the Austrian Society for Geomechanics in 1968. From 1975 to 1981 he was president of the latter organization.

== Awards ==
- In 1975, he was awarded an honorary doctorate by the Faculty of Civil Engineering and Surveying at the University of Karlsruhe.
- In 1977, he was appointed an honorary professor in the Department of Civil Engineering and Surveying at the Technical University of Munich.
- In 1979, he was awarded the professional title "Baurat h.c."
- In 1994, he was presented with the Golden Medal of Honor of the State of Salzburg.
