= Leopold Müller =

Leopold Müller may refer to:

- Leopold Müller (engineer) (1908–1988), Austrian engineer
- Leopold Müller (painter) (1834–1892), Austrian painter
