= Do Ab (Iran) =

Rural area in Savadkuh County, Mazanderan Province, Iran

Coordinates: 36°01′N 53°03′E

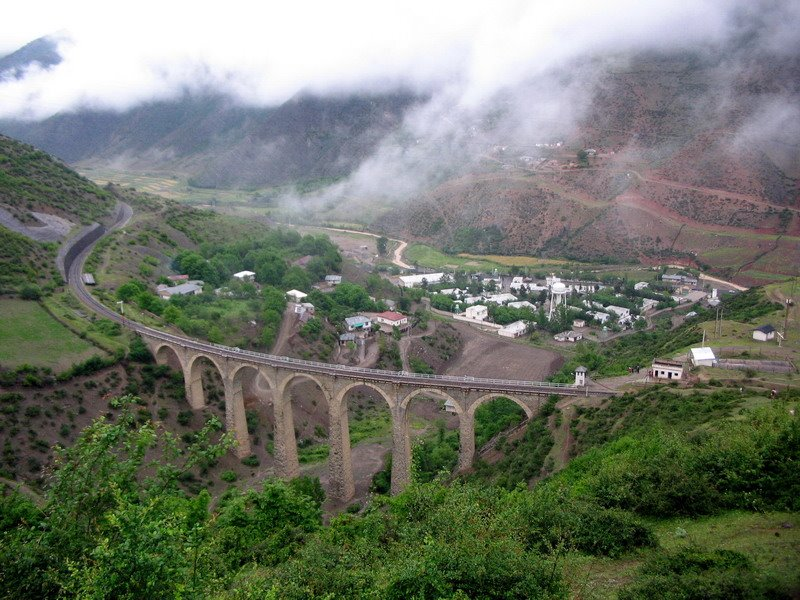
Do Ab Railway Bridge in Bala Do Ab, one of the famous bridges of Mazanderan.

Do Ab is the name of a rural area situated in the heart of Savadkuh County of Mazanderan province, Iran. It contains five villages. Sevatcow station on the Mazanderan branch of the trans-Iranian railway was built there during the rule of Reza Shah Pahlavi. Currently, the train stops at about 1 p.m. every day. It is about 7 kilometers south of Pol-e Sefid (the Capital of the township) and about 14 kilometers from Veresk Bridge.

== See also ==
- Bala Do Ab
- Pain Do Ab
