= Fascine =

Bundle of wood used for support or path construction

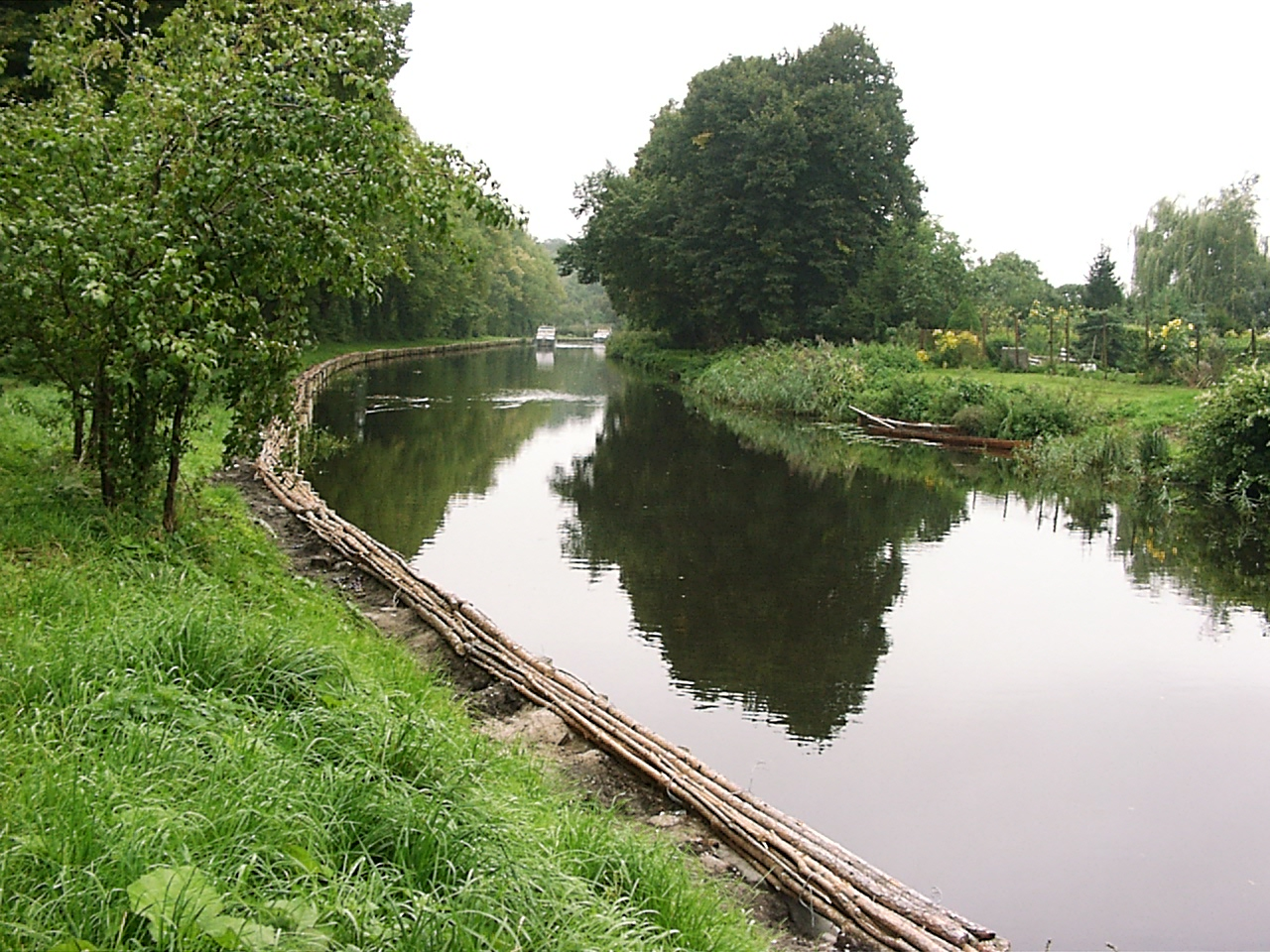
Templin Channel in Templin, Germany. The riverbank was strengthened with fascines.

A fascine (pronounced /fəˈsiːn/) is a rough bundle of brushwood or other material used for strengthening an earthen structure, or making a path across uneven or wet terrain. Typical uses are protecting the banks of streams from erosion (a fascine mattress), covering marshland, or providing ground improvement in a manner similar to that of modern geotextiles.

In war they have often been used to help armies – in modern times, especially tanks and other vehicles – cross trenches, valleys, marshes, muddy or uneven terrain, etc.

== Early military use ==
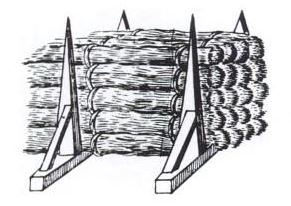
Two chandeliers stacked with fascines.

Fascine bundles were used defensively for revetting (shoring up) trenches or ramparts, especially around artillery batteries, or offensively to fill in ditches and to cross obstacles on a battlefield.

Fascine bridges, a regularly attested feature of Roman military engineering, would have been widespread in the ancient world due to their usefulness and ease of construction. During the Siege of Alesia in 52 BCE, the Gauls attempted to repel the invading Romans by filling the Roman trenches in with fascines and covering their traps, to support their counter-assault.

In mountainous terrain, such as in Syria, fascines could help to cross natural obstacles. In the Battle of Zela in 47 BCE, Caesar's legions worked overnight filling in whole valleys with "a great quantity of fascines" to quickly gain an advantageous position over the army of Pharnaces II of Pontus, removing them afterwards to protect their own camp.

Subsequently, the use of fascines by military engineers continued almost wherever armies were deployed and could be an incredibly cheap and effective "weapon" during a siege, both for attackers and for defenders.

The Battle of Narva in 1700 was a pivotal early battle in the Great Northern War (1700–1721) between the Swedish army commanded by Charles XII and the Russian army of Tsar Peter I. The battle took place near the present-day border between Estonia and Russia. Protected by the Narva River to their east, around the town the Russian Army had dug a trench six feet wide in front of an earth wall nine feet high. The Russian defenders had 140 cannon mounted around the walls, they outnumbered the exhausted Swedish army four to one and a blizzard had just broken out. Nonetheless, Charles advanced: "Throwing their fascines into the ditch, the Swedes swarmed across on top of them. Waving swords and bayonets, they climbed over the earthworks and threw themselves on the foe. Within fifteen minutes, a fierce hand-to-hand battle was taking place inside the works."

A hundred years later, during the Napoleonic Wars of 1803 to 1815, fascines were still in regular use – billhooks, used for cutting branches and saplings, were standard issue for riflemen – but appear to have been used defensively rather than for crossing trenches. In 1806–07 the French General Vandamme besieged Breslau with the assistance of his engineer Colonel Blein. When crossing enemy trenches, Blein used boats, trestles and ladders covered with boards to cross enemy entrenchments – when his account mentions fascines it is along with gabions as a defensive element.

== World Wars ==
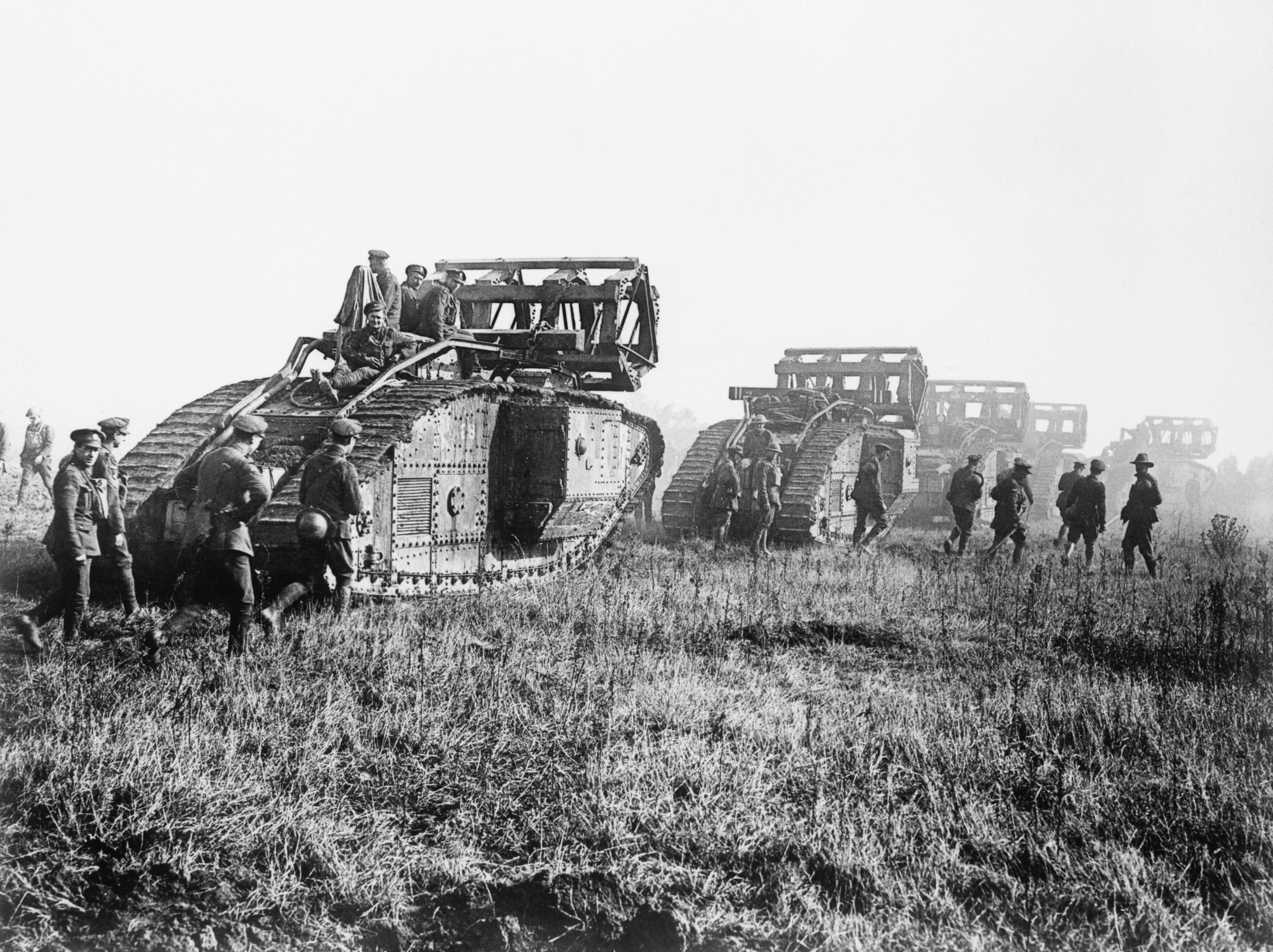
British Mark V tanks carrying crib fascines, 1918.

Tanks in World War I, namely the British Mark IV, started the practice of carrying fascines on the roof, to be deployed to fill trenches that would otherwise be an obstacle to the tank. These were constructed from the traditional bundles of brushwood used to make fascines since Roman times. Although these were cumbersome to deploy they proved an effective gap-crossing device and were used widely by the tanks of the day that weighed up to about 30 tons.

In World War II the use of fascines continued as a gap-crossing device and within the British Army these were launched from the Churchill AVRE – a Royal Engineer derivative of the standard Churchill tank (40 tons).

The Imperial Japanese Army (IJA) pre-positioned fascines made of metal pipes across the Khalkha River (between Japanese held Manchuria and Mongolia, the USSR's protectorate) in advance of the IJA's 1939 foray into Mongolia. The use of hollow pipes had been predicated on their ability to allow water flow; the pipes were secured such that they were awash, and the river's unimpeded flow initially hid the fascines from Soviet reconnaissance aircraft. While these fascines were designed for stealth rather than combat deployment and were not deployed via armoured vehicles, the use of hollow pipes as fascines was a significant step forward.

== Developments since World War II ==
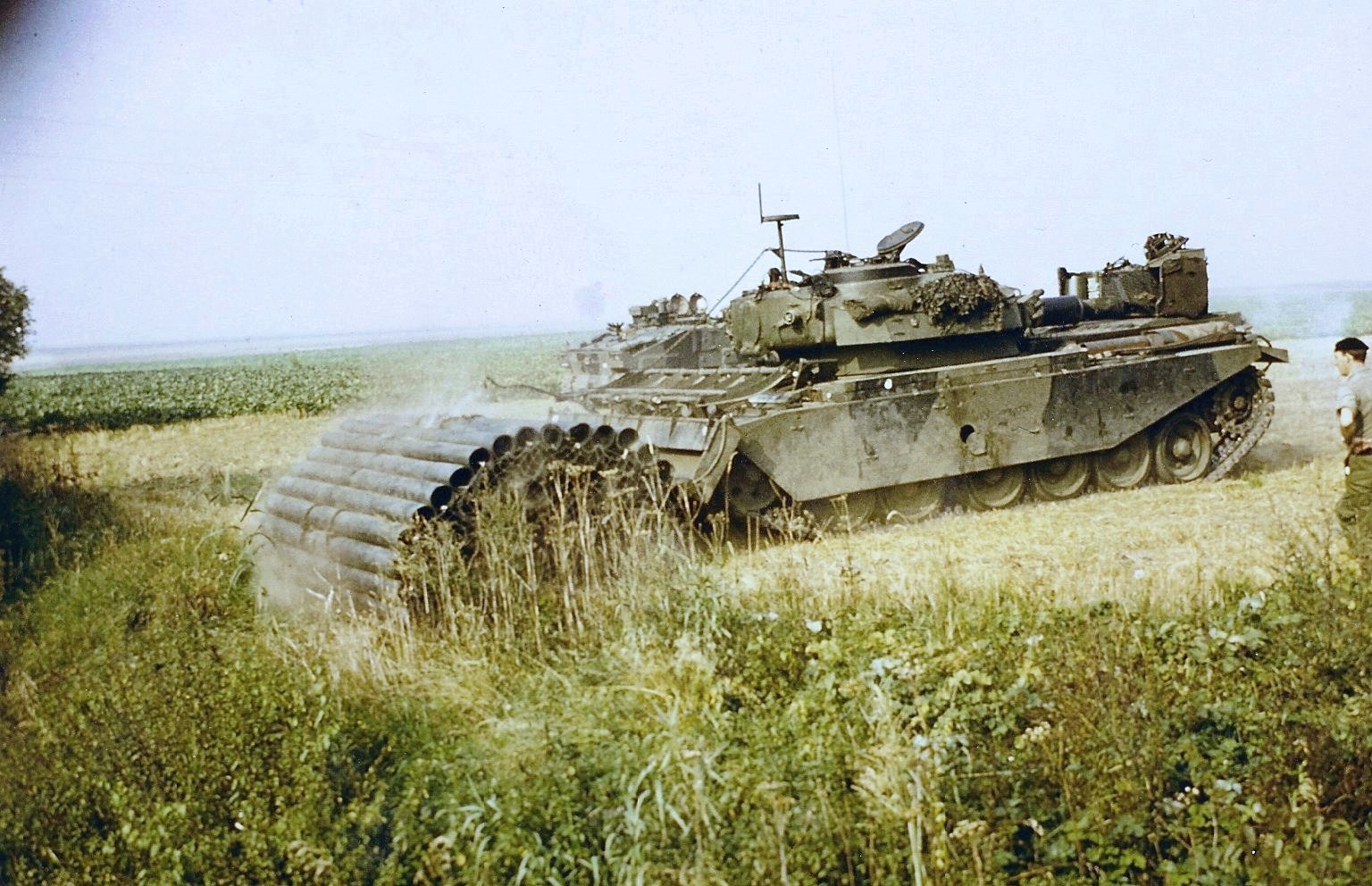
Single fascine launch near Hannover – Centurion AVRE

The pipe fascine was further developed in the British Army in the early 1980s to meet the challenges of assuring the mobility of movement in West Germany in the event of a NATO conflict with the Warsaw Pact.

The majority of obstacles to mobility in West Germany run north–south, and movement by military forces would have been east–west. Within the area of operation of the British Army, near Hannover, there is a significant number of smaller gaps, mainly drainage ditches, streams and small rivers approximately 5–10 m (16–33 ft) wide and 1.5–2.5 m (5–8 ft) deep that are sufficient to stop armoured vehicles. Given the low number of AVLBs available, a solution was needed to bridge these gaps quickly and cheaply and under fire. In earlier wars, wooden fascines had been used, but these were ineffective for use with the much heavier modern vehicles, some of which weighed up to 70 tons.

The Royal Engineers Experimental Establishment at Christchurch did initial tests on the possible use of 23-centimetre (9 in) high-density plastic pipes held together with chains. These would allow water flow, and not be damaged with the higher modern vehicle weight. Further development was done by Lt C. Roebuck RE and his troop, 5 Troop, 31 Armoured Engineer Squadron, 32 Armoured Engineer Regiment at Munsterlager, North Germany in 1981–82, to enable full acceptance and provide user instructions for operational use. This development involved testing in different gaps and conditions, e.g. concrete-lined canals to earth-banked rural field drainage channels, possibility of multiple fascine use in a single gap and launch testing both day, night and in limited visibility. During the trials the development team drivers became skilled at the launching of the fascine and were able to launch two or even three fascines into a single gap. However for regular operational use by less skilled crews it was recommended that only single fascines should be used as the use of 2nd or 3rd fascines required the launch vehicle to launch the subsequent fascine whilst on the potentially unstable first fascine. This required a perfect launch to ensure the second fascine was quickly in place to make the first fascine stable and held in position. If this did not happen there was potentially significant risk to the launch vehicle and crew especially in water filled gaps.

A launch technique was developed: approach the target gap at speed, line up onto alignment/launch markers, drive over first marker then brake sharply at second marked point and fire the explosive bolts holding the travel hawsers so that the fascine, through inertia, rolled off directly into the middle of the gap. When in position, they travel over it to level the road surface for other vehicles to cross. This whole process would take less than a minute, essential for an assault crossing possibly under fire.

The fascine was subsequently accepted into service and used successfully in a number of operational and non-operational roles using the Centurion AVRE, a Centurion tank derivative with a bulldozer blade and 165 mm demolition gun fitted. It was used in combat for the first time during the First Iraq war to breach anti tank ditches. The British Army now use the Trojan, based on the Challenger 2 tank, to carry and deploy pipe fascines.

== Gallery ==
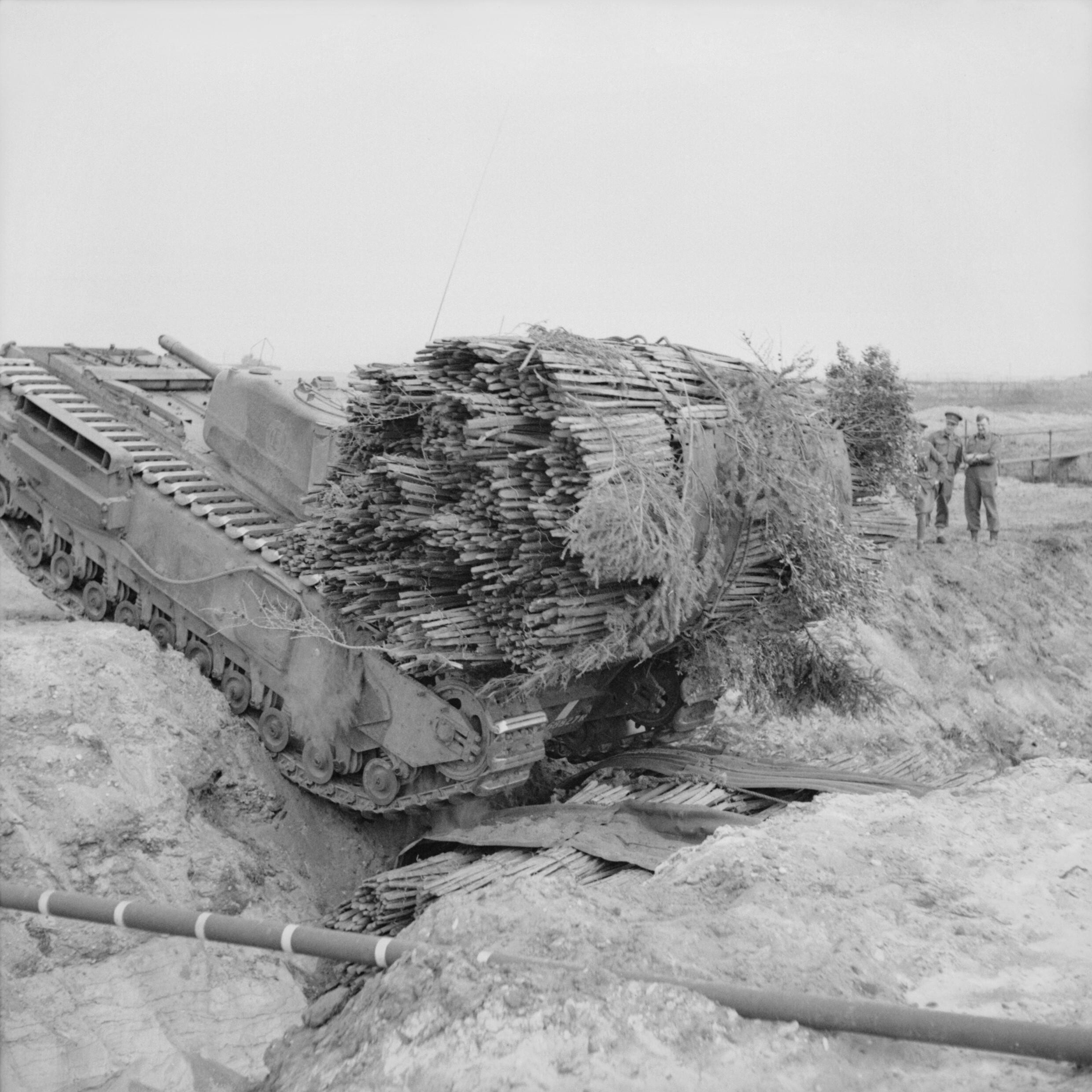
A Churchill tank, carrying a fascine, crosses a ditch using an already deployed fascine, 1943.

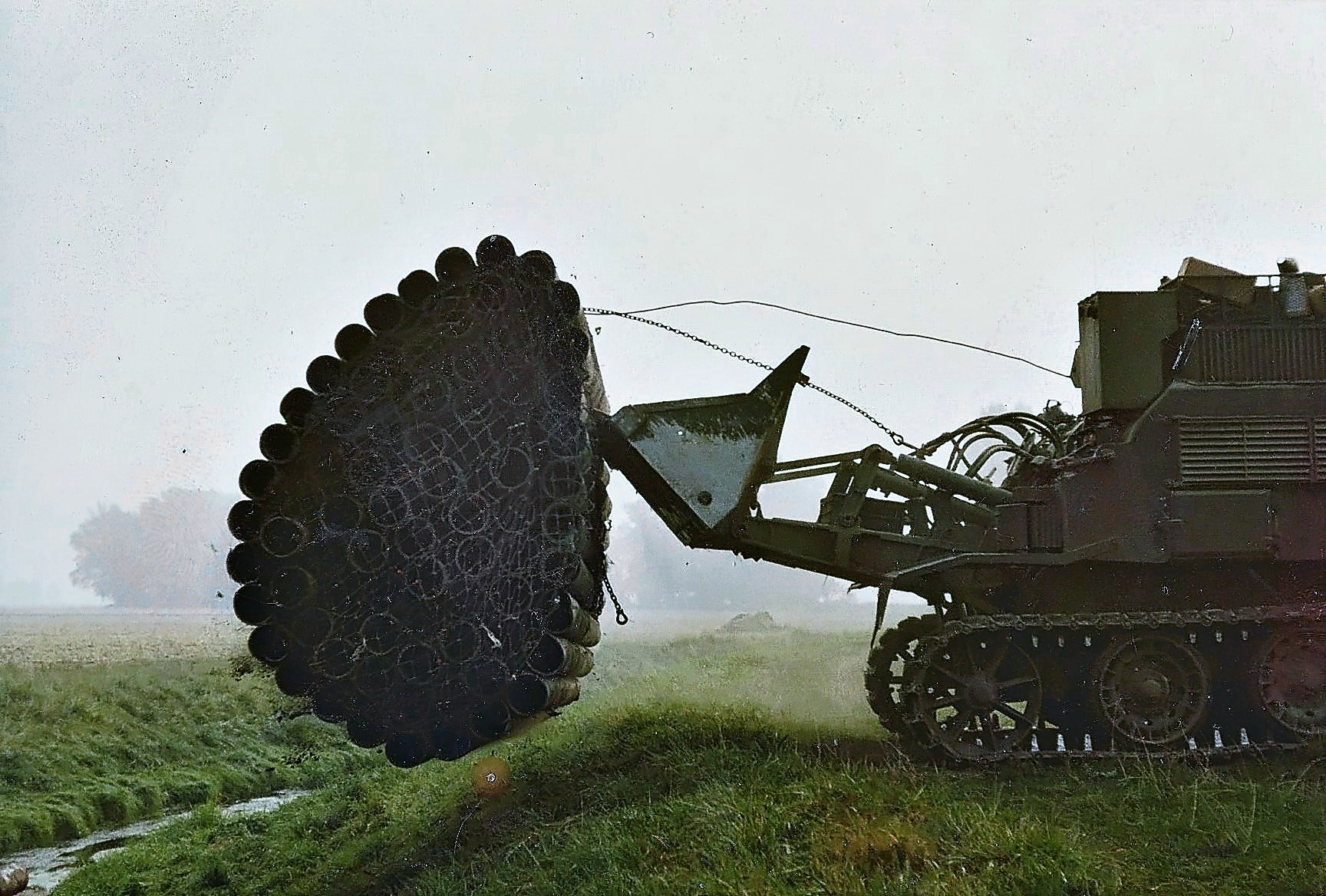
Combat Engineer Tractor launch

== See also ==
- Billhook
- Fasces
- Fascine knife
- Ferula
- Withy
- Spiling
