= Analysis of controlled deformation in rocks and soils =

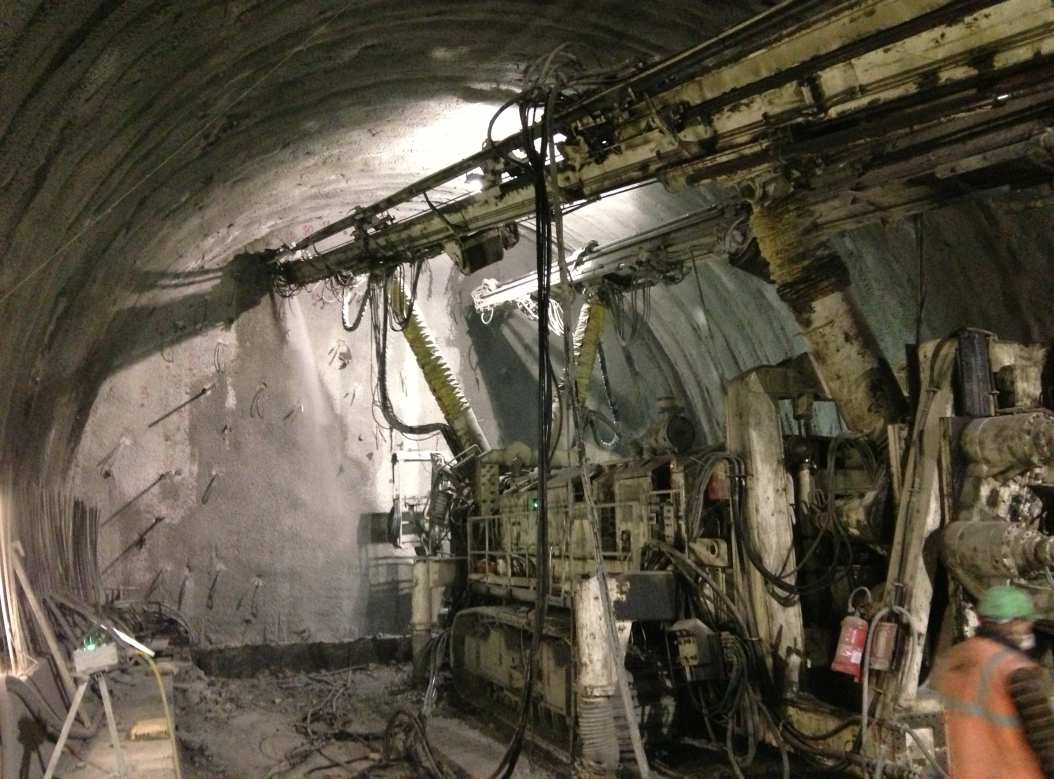
Drilling of the tunnel face anchors, Val di Sambro Tunnel, Italy

The Analysis of Controlled Deformation in Rocks and Soils, translated from Italian Analisi delle Deformazioni Controllate nelle Rocce e nei Suoli (ADECO-RS), also known as The New Italian Tunneling Method (NITM), is a modern tunnel design and construction approach. ADECO-RS was proposed by Pietro Lunardi in the 1980s on the basis of long in-depth research into the stress-strain behavior of more than 1,000 km of tunnel and more than 9,000 faces. In the past few decades, ADECO-RS has been widely used in Italian railway, highway and large underground construction projects and has been incorporated into Italian tunnel design and construction specifications.

ADECO- RS is a systematic and full-face mechanized excavation tunneling technology that can be used under various surrounding rock conditions, especially in shallow buried soft formation. Paying attention to the role of advance core is the core philosophy of ADECO-RS. The strength, stability, and sensibility to the deformation of the core medium before tunnel face (same concept as advance core) are playing a vital role during construction of the tunnel. There is a distinct boundary between the design stage and construction stage in the procedure of ADECO-RS, making the possibility of forecasting of the budget and duration of the construction accurate.

ADECO-RS believes the problem of the excavation of tunnels as a three dimensional problem, with attention focused on the three types of deformation: tunnel face (extrusion, pre-convergence) and cavity (convergence).

== Procedure of the ADECO-RS ==
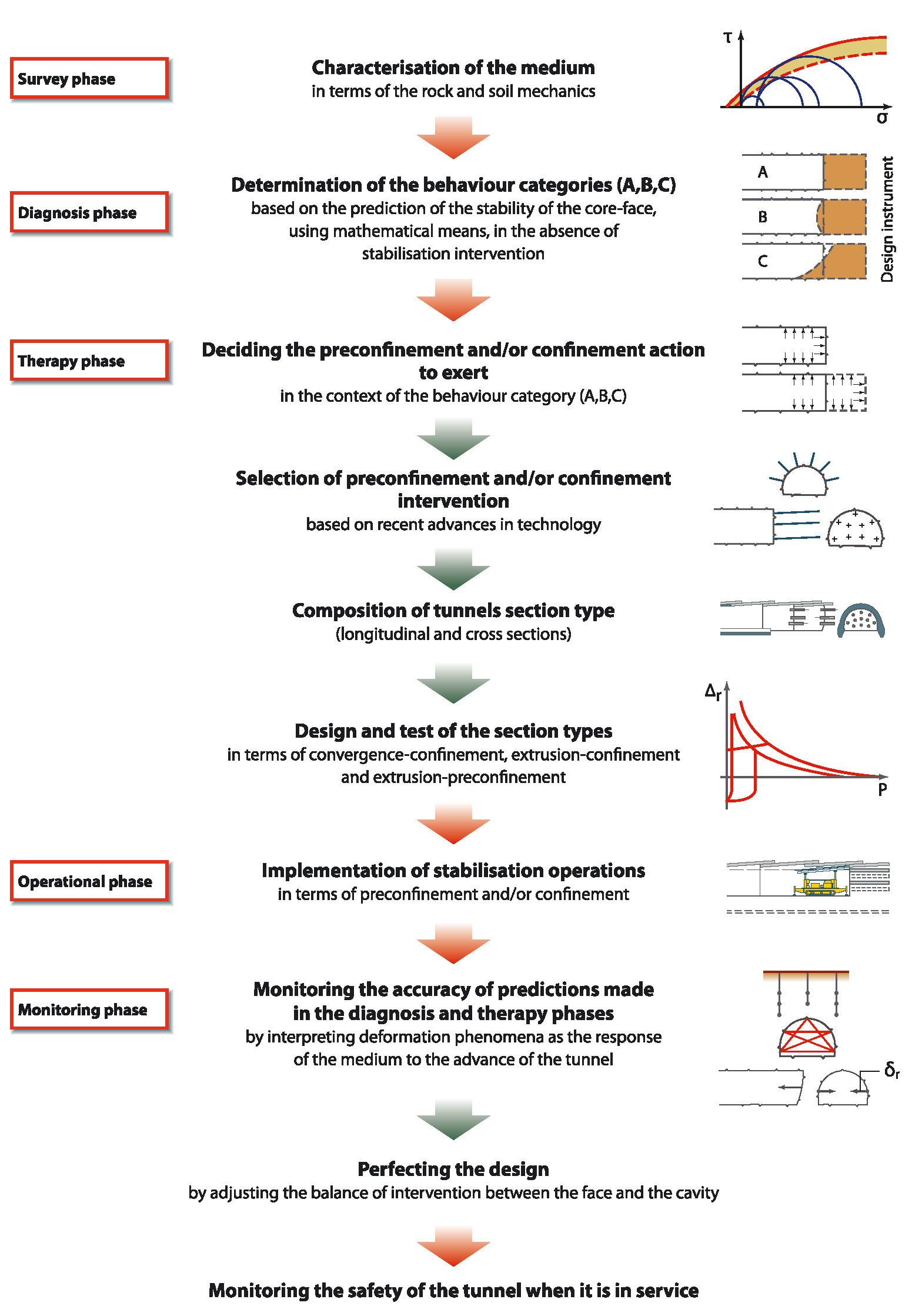
Implication procedure of ADECO-RS

The procedure of the ADECO-RS consists of two main stages: design stage and construction stage. The design stage includes a survey phase(1), a diagnosis phase(2) and a therapy phase(3). The construction stage consists of an operational phase(4), a monitoring phase and a final design adjustment phase(5).

In survey phase(1): to determine the geomechanical knowledge and characteristics of the medium where the tunnel is located in.

In diagnosis phase(2): to predict and classify the surrounding rock of tunnel face into A, B, C three forms based on its stability conditions.

In therapy phase(3): to the determine methods of stabilizing (preconfinement or simple confinement) and excavating the tunnel on the basis of three behaviour categories, A, B, C. and then, to the theoretical evaluation of the effectiveness.

In operational phase(4): to begin with the construction, during which the stabilizing methods (confinement and preconfinement) for controlling the Deformation Response are adopted.

In the monitoring phase and a final design adjustment phase(5): the deformation behavior of the tunnel face and advance core are monitored and interpreted. Then to compare the prediction data made in the diagnosis phase and therapy phase with monitored data. After which, to fine tune the design by adjusting the balance of stabilisation techniques between the face and the cavity.

== Principles ==
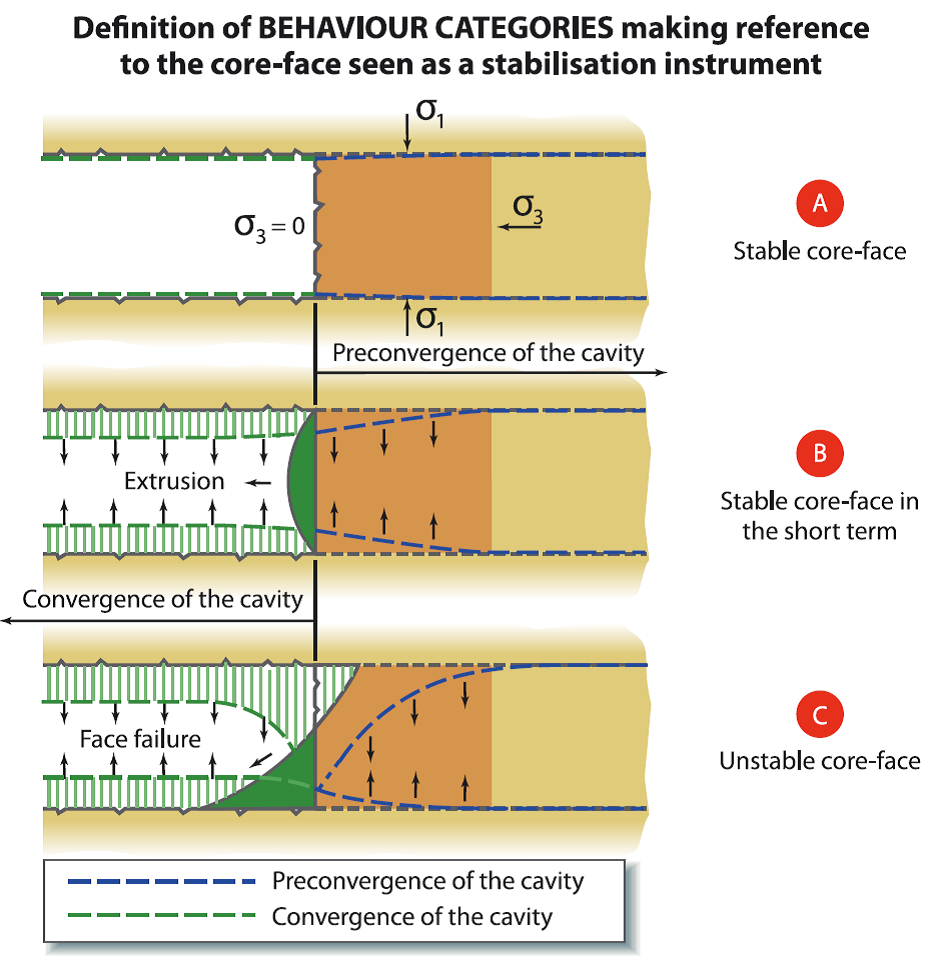
The ADECO-RS stress-strain behaviour categories

ADECO-RS predicts the stability of the tunnel face by surveying the material of the advanced core and studies the stability of the core-face in terms of extrusion, convergence and pre-convergence. The behavior is then categorized according to its stress-strain behavior including, Category A: stable core-face; Category B: stable core-face in the short term; Category C: unstable core-face. ADECO-RS emphasizes the control of surrounding rock deformation, the advanced support and reinforcement of the surrounding rock in front of the tunnel face. An important philosophy of the ADECO-RS method is the introduction of a new conceptual framework for underground engineering. It regards the advance core medium as a new long-term and short-term stability tool for tunnels. The strength of the advance core medium and its sensitivity to deformation determine the stability and the deformation characteristics of the tunnel. Taking measures to improve the stiffness of the advance core medium can relieve the deformation reaction of the tunnel face and cavity. ADECO-RS are broadly based on the following principles:

- In the tunnel excavation process, the deformation of the surrounding rock (including extrusion deformation, pre-convergence and convergence deformation) should be analyzed and controlled.
- The application of the advanced core soil (reinforced with fibreglass, leading pipe shelf, small pipe grouting and other enhanced methods) is a structural stability factor for the deformation reaction during tunnel excavation.
- The exploration, prediction, protection, reinforcement and excavation of the advanced core have become the most important content for ensuring the safety of tunnel construction.
- The strength and deformation characteristics of the advance core medium are the real cause of tunnel deformation (including extrusion deformation, pre-convergence and convergence deformation).

Criteria for the stability categories of tunnels constructed by ADECO-RS
| Judging condition | Category A | Category B | Category C |
|---|---|---|---|
| Rock mass strength | Rock mass strength can keep the tunnel stable | Rock mass strength can keep the tunnel stable in short term | Unstable because of rock mass strength less than layer stress |
| Arch effect | Arch effect formed near from tunnel | Arch effect formed far from tunnel | No arch effect |
| Surrounding rock deformation | Deformation occurs in the elastic range, and the size can be measured in centimetres | Deformation occurs in the elastic-plastic range, and the size can be measured in centimetres | Instability in the surrounding rock without reinforcement |
| Tunnel face state | Stable | Stable in short-term | Collapse without supporting |
| Groundwater | Tunnel stability will not be affected by groundwater | Tunnel stability will be less affected by groundwater | Highly affected by water, especially the impact of flowing water |
| Supporting method | Usually general treatment is mainly to prevent the weakening of the cave wall and the falling rock | After the face, the traditional radial surrounding rock support measures are allowed | Adopting the advance arch pre-support to form the arch effect |

== Features ==
=== Advantages ===
ADECO-RS approach comes up with a reliable manual for civil engineers to classify the tunnel into three basic categories according to the stability of tunnel face. No matter what types and mechanical behaviour of surrounding rock, tunnel section can be adopted. Budgets and construction duration can be accurately derived. The advantages of ADECO-RS list in the following：

- Full-section construction (this is very beneficial for on-site management and can reduce the construction stages required for step excavation).
- Modern tunnel construction (good production efficiency, continuous and stable progress).
- Even at the face of the tunnel, the construction site can be kept clean and safe to construct.
- The cost can be determined (when the project is completed, it is usually less expensive than using traditional technology).
- High flexibility (only one type of equipment can solve different kinds of geotechnical excavation).
- It is possible to make out the main contractor to guide operations in all type of the ground.

=== Comparing with new Austrian tunnelling method (NATM) ===
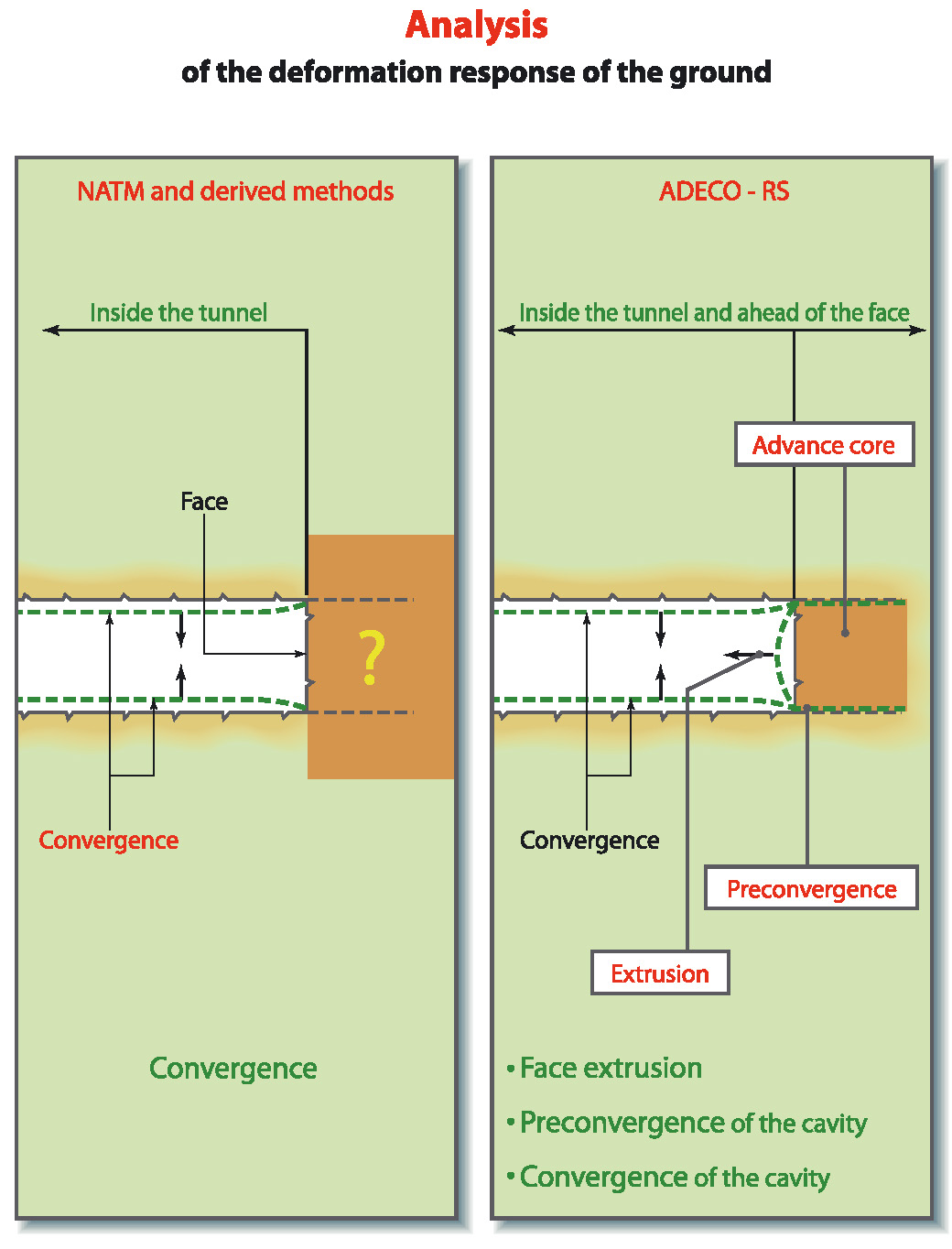
ADECO-RS and NATM compasion in analysis deformation

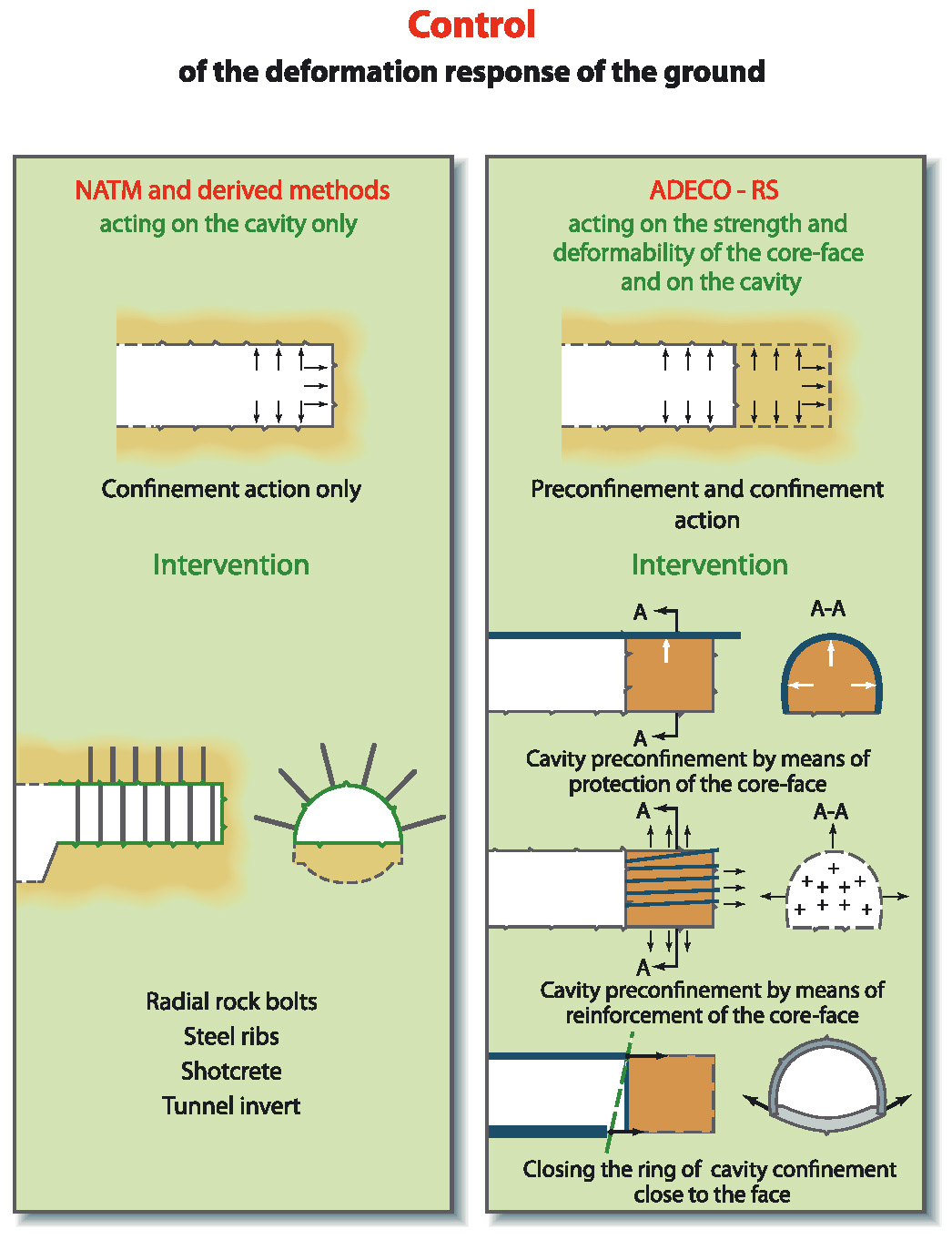
ADECO-RS and NATM compasion in control deformation

The famous theory of characteristic lines and convergence-confinement method are the two fundamental bases of NATM. Although in the theory of NATM, it acknowledges the positive role of the presence of the advance core to support the stability of cavity, it does not come up with any effective suggestions on how to exploit that effect, nor did it indicates how do deal with an unstable face. Afterwards, by adopting geomechanical classifications, NATM progresses a lot compared to its past on the basis of principal merits as following:

- The ground was considered as a structural material for the first time.
- Primary support technologies such as shotcrete and rock bolts were imported.
- NATM put emphasis on the monitoring and interpreting the deformation of the ground systematically

However, compared with ADECO-RS, NATM still encounters several limitations for the reason that NATM considers the construction of the tunnels as a two-dimensional problem. The limitations of NATM with respect to ADECO-DS shown as following：

- The category system of NATM is an incomplete and unilateral for it can't be used for all types of medium.
- NATM neglects the positive effect of the advance core.
- NATM gives up several new construction technologies and proceeds to adopt simple cavity confinement action.
- There isn't a distinct difference between the design and construction phase in NATM.

The detailed contrast between ADECO-RS with NATM are shown in the following table:

Contrast of ADECO-RS method with NATM
| | Item | ADECO-RS | NATM |
|---|---|---|---|
| Differences | Attitude to advance core | Pay attention to the stability of advance core (the core of ground ahead of the tunnel face) | No attention on this |
| Differences | Monitoring measurement | Pay attention to the measurement of the convergence, pre-convergence and extrusion of advance core | No attention on this |
| Differences | Advanced support | Emphasize the artificial control of the advance core and improve the strength of surrounding rock | Only pay attention to the reinforcement of the front profile of the tunnel, no reinforcement to the advance core. |
| Differences | Tunnel section excavation | Mechanical full-section excavation | Excavation by steps (CRD, CD, etc) |
| Differences | Duration | Accurately predict the duration in design stage | Accurately predict the duration in design stage |
| Differences | Relationship of design， construction and monitoring | Emphasis is placed on the monitoring of pre-convergence, convergence and extrusion deformation of the tunnel, timely feedback and dynamic design. | No pre-convergence and extrusion monitoring are performed, The monitoring of the tunnel is passive action, so timely feedback and dynamic design are weak. |
| The essential difference | | Emphasis on the control, monitoring and dynamic design of the advance core, highlighting the concept of mechanized full-section and average excavation | There is no control about the advance core, but more emphasis on step-by-step excavation. |

== See also ==
- New Austrian tunnelling method
- Geotechnical engineering
- Rock mass classification
- Tunnels
