= Veresk Bridge =

Part of the Trans-Iranian Railway

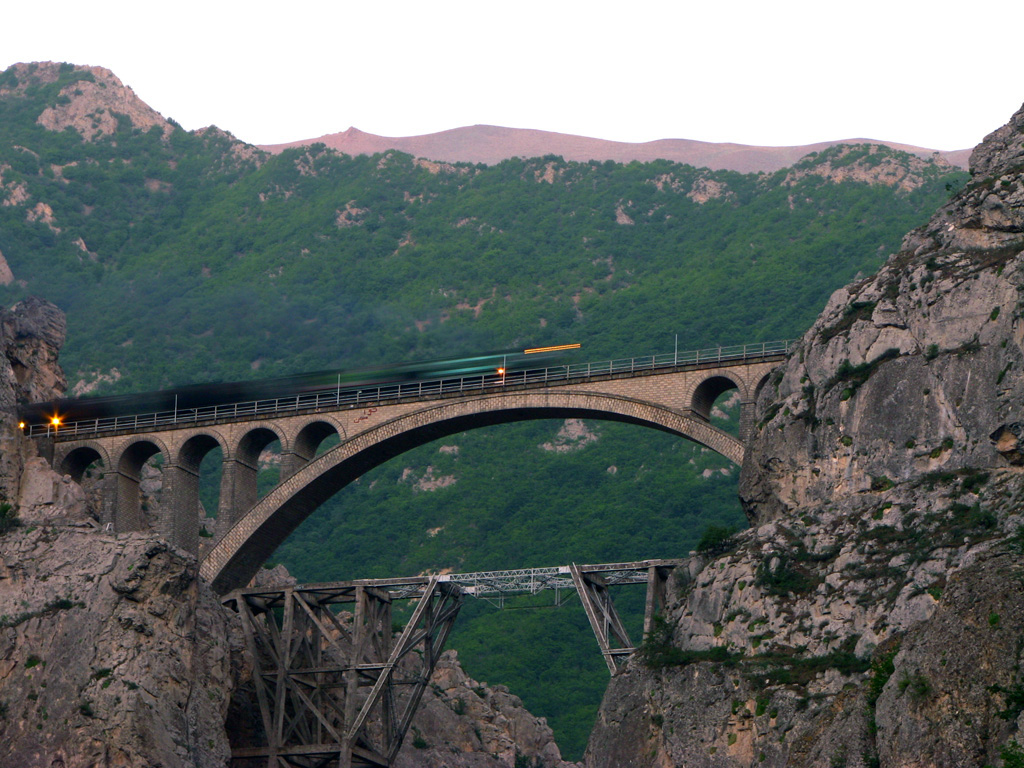
- Coordinates: 35°54′12″N 52°59′26″E
- Carries: Tehran Railway to Mazandaran (North) Railway
- Crosses: Savadkuh Mountains
- Locale: Savadkuh County, Mazandaran Province, Iran
- Other name: Veresk

Characteristics
- Design: Arch bridge
- Total length: 112.40 meters
- Longest span: 66 meters
- Clearance below: 110 meters

History
- Engineering design by: Kampsax Company
- Opened: December 1935

Location
- Interactive map of Veresk Bridge

The Veresk bridge (Persian: پل ورسک, romanized: Pol-e Veresk) is a masonry arch bridge in northern Iran. It was constructed by Danish Consortium Kampsax, during the reign of Reza Shah. It is located in the Veresk district of Savadkuh County, in Mazandaran province.

== History ==
In 1933, the Danish Consortium Kampsax, which had been chosen by the government of Iran as general contractor for the Trans-Iranian Railway, assigned Lot number 8 on the Northern section of the project to the Italian Engineer Guido Romeo Pizzagalli from Milan. In November 1933, he founded the company Impresa G.R. Pizzagalli & C. together with several Italian engineers, among them the three brothers Battista, Guido and Cesare Delleani from Biella.

The lot had a total length of 7,600 m with a height difference of 186 m and was composed of 10 tunnels, and two major bridges, one with a length of 52 m and an arch of 25 m and the second with a length of 112 m and an arch of 60 m, which is now considered the masterpiece of the Trans-Iranian Railway and which has been among the world’s tallest bridges at the time of construction. Cesare Delleani was in charge of the construction of the bridge. The project had been elaborated by a group of engineers of KAMPSAX.

Works on the bridge started in August 1934. The bridge and whole lot was finished by December 1935 and handed over to the contractor by January 1936. Work on the lot has been carried out by 260 specialized workers from Europe, mostly from Italy and about 2700 unspecialised workers from Asia. Two cable-ways had been installed fort the transport of workers and building material to the bridge construction.

By July 1934 a flood in the Versek valley at the bottom of the construction site killed many workers. On 5 March 1935, a strong earthquake claimed many casualties among workers and substantially damaged the construction site.

In the summer of 1935, Reza Shah paid a visit to the bridge under construction and personally congratulated the chief engineer, Cesare Delleani.

During World War II, it was known as the Pol-e Piroozi ("The bridge of victory").

== Description ==
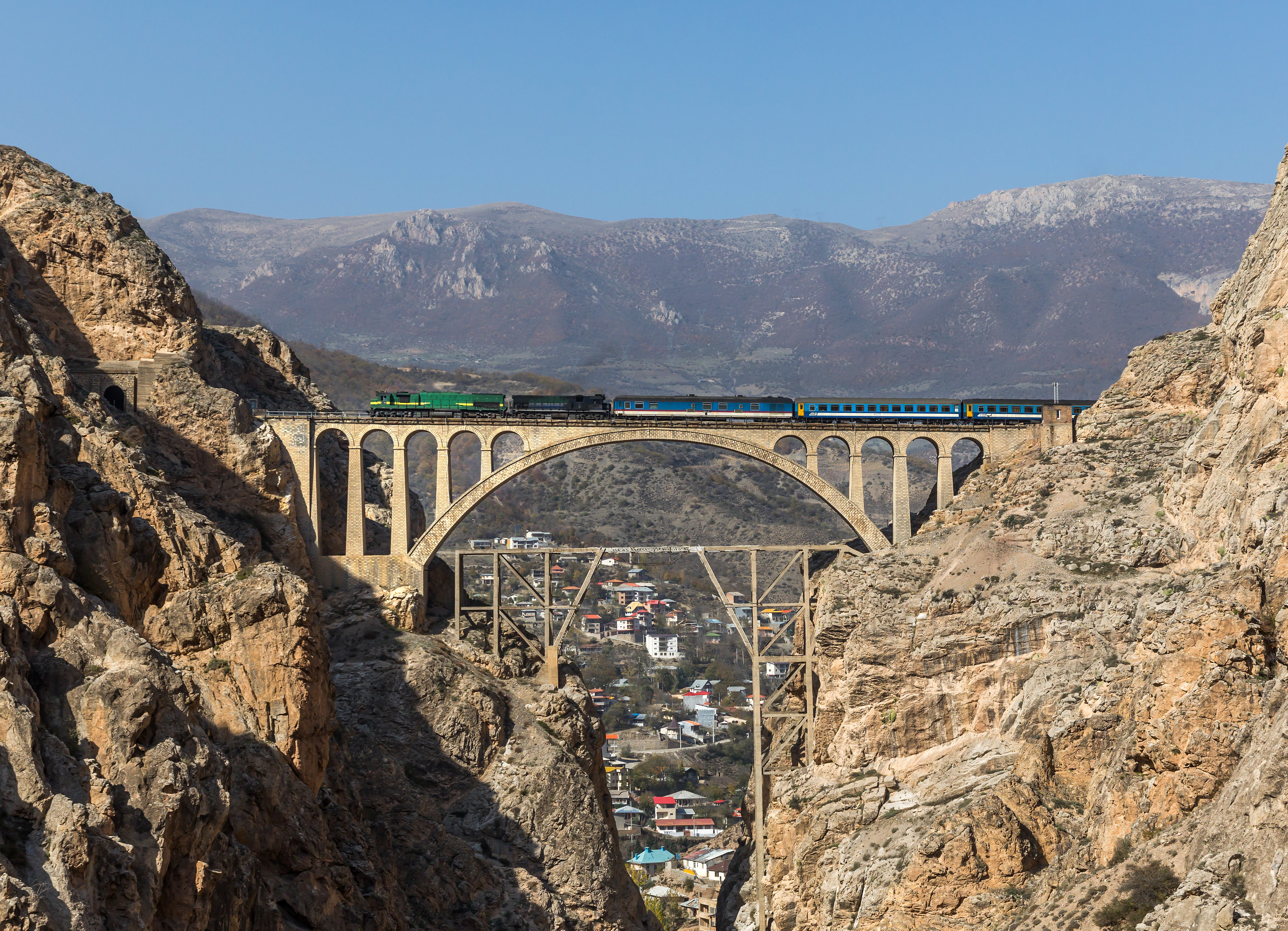
Veresk Bridge

The bridge stands 110 metres (360 ft) above the valley bottom, its arch measures 66 metres (217 ft) and the overall length of the bridge is 112.40 metres (368.8 ft). The bridge serves the Trans-Iranian Railway network in Northern Iran.

The Veresk bridge connects the railway between Tehran and the Caspian Sea region. It is located in Mazandaran Veresk district of Savadkuh County, 85 kilometers south of Ghaemshahr and connects two of the mountains in the Abbas Abad region. The bridge is one of the masterpieces of the Danish engineering firm Kampsax, (consisting of Danish, German and Austrian engineers like Ladislaus von Rabcewicz) as well as Italian civil construction art serving the Trans-Iranian Railway network in Northern Iran.

The Master Carpenter for the construction of the lumber concrete forms was Giacomo Di Marco, from the Friuli region of Italy, and detailed in the book he authored. It has been said after finishing the bridge, people feared that the train would not be able to pass the narrow bridge and that it would break. As a result, according to an anecdote the engineer and his family stood under it when the first train passed the bridge (local accounts claim that Reza Shah had asked them to do so).

== Further details ==
Near the bridge is a memorial structure built in memory of all the construction workers who lost their lives in the course of building the bridge and its nearby tunnels. The Austrian engineer Walter Aigner, following his wishes, is buried in the cemetery of Veresk. Under the bridge is a tunnel through which trains pass after crossing the bridge and gradually dropping altitude and before pulling into the train station.

During World War II, Reza Shah was asked by Adolf Hitler to blow up all tunnels and bridges, including the Veresk Bridge, on Iran's railway lines in order to delay the transfer of goods and reinforcement troops to the north for the Russians. He furthermore promised to replace and reconstruct all of such demolished structures following the Germans’ victory in the war. Reza Shah rejected the request. Trains connecting Tehran to Gorgan or Sari pass over the bridge an average of four times a day.

== Gallery ==
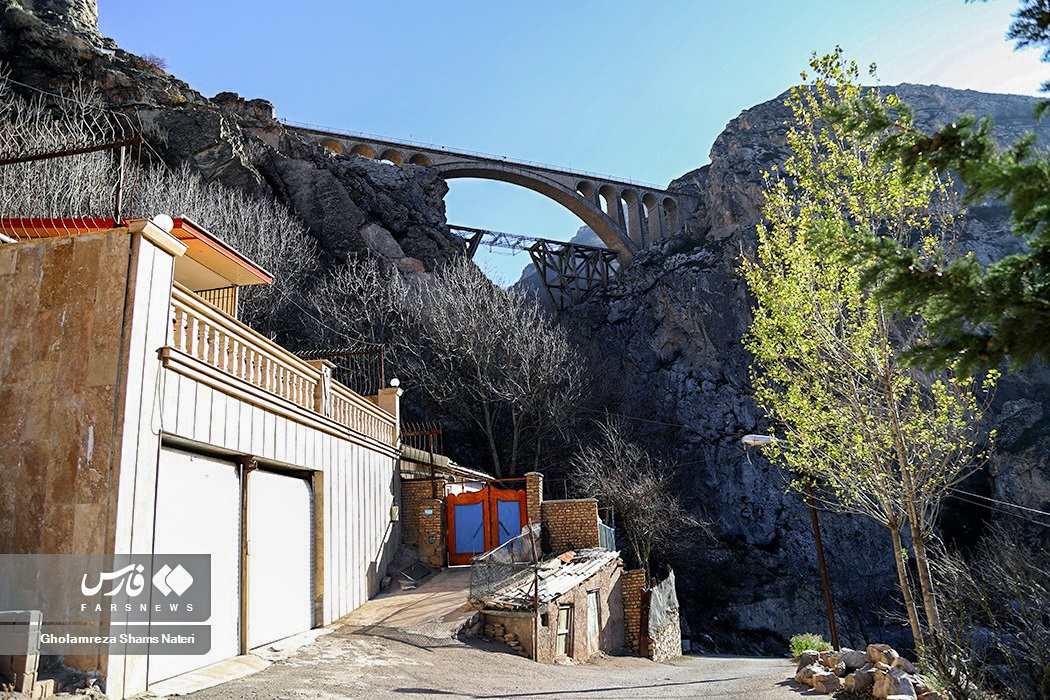

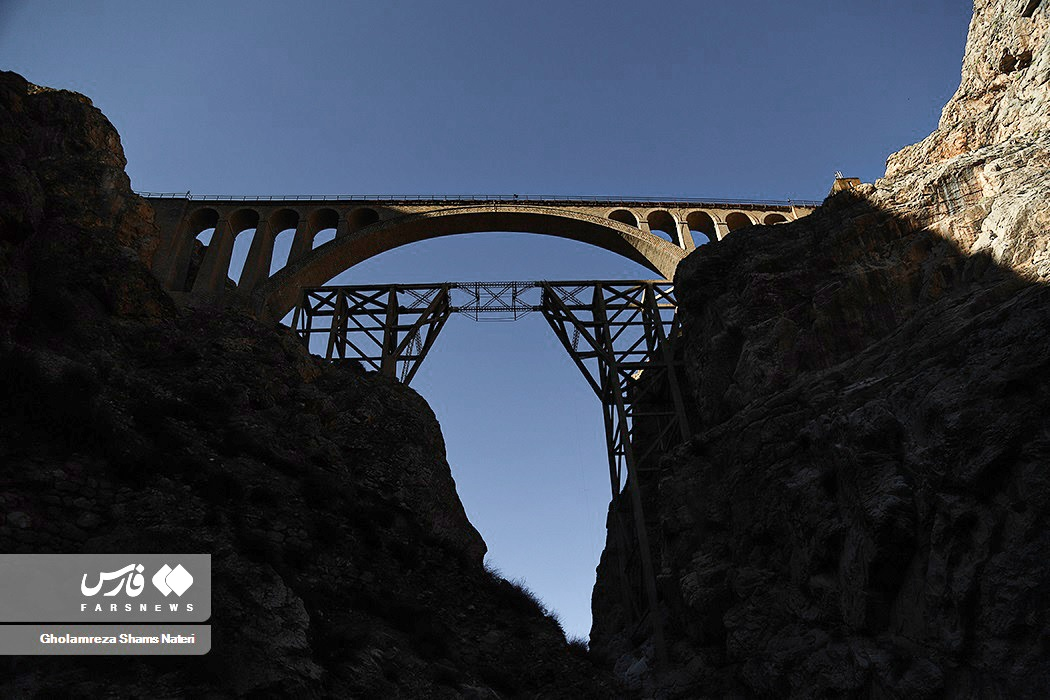

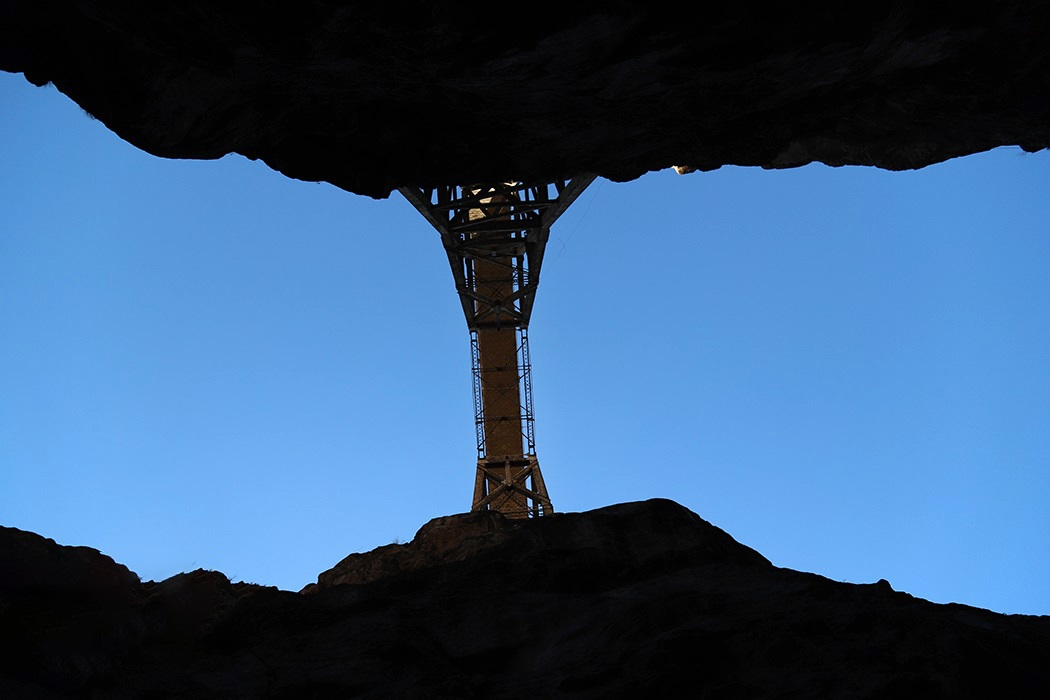

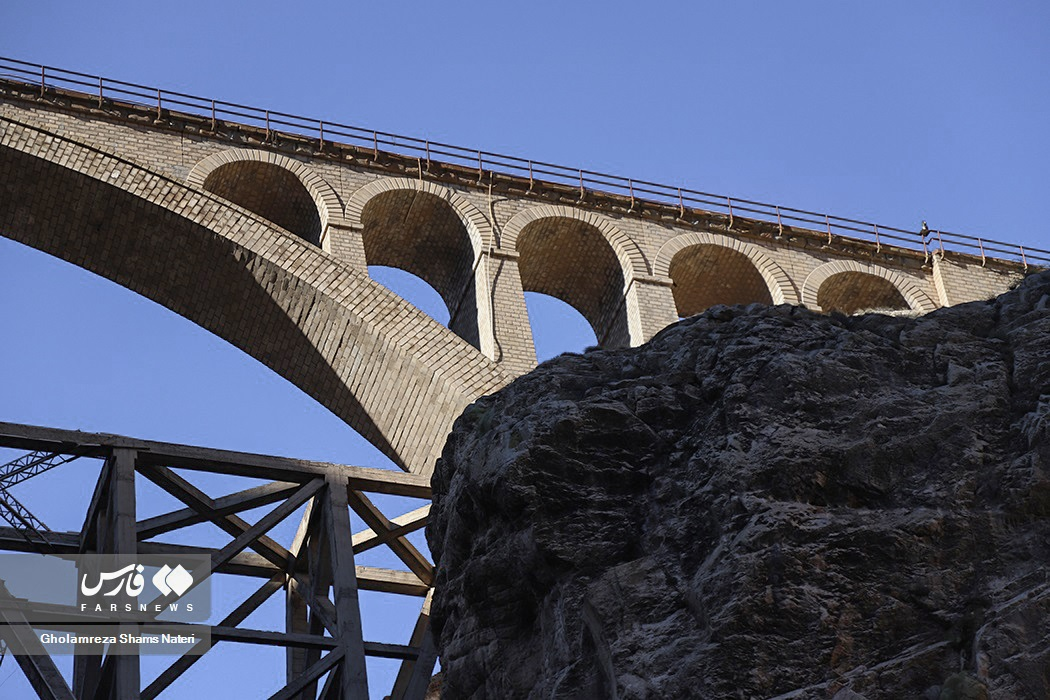

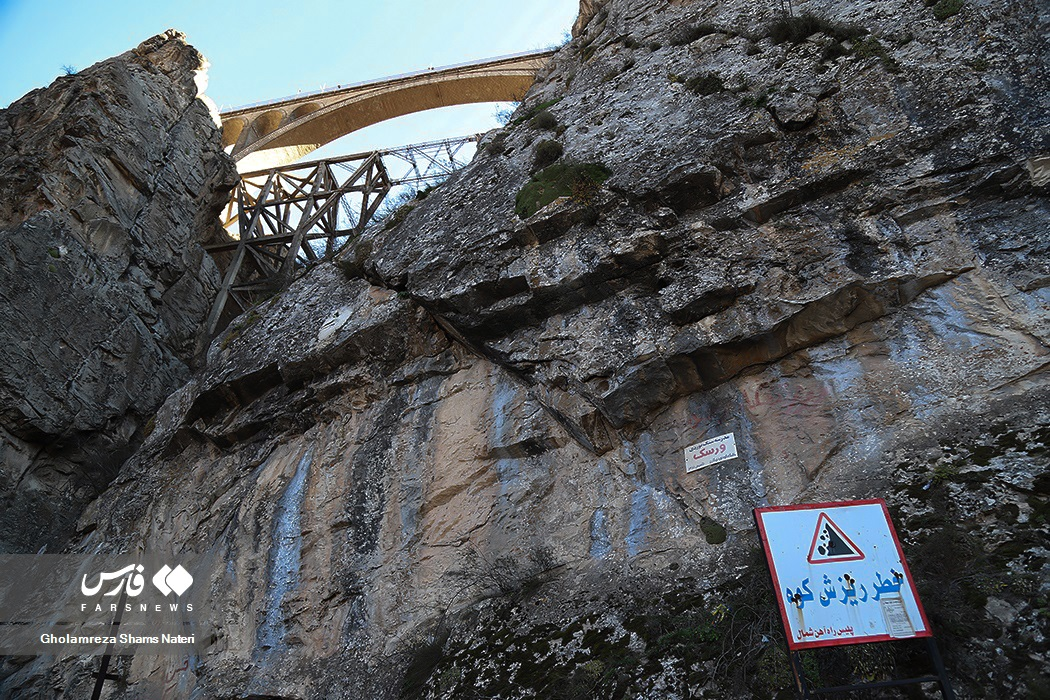

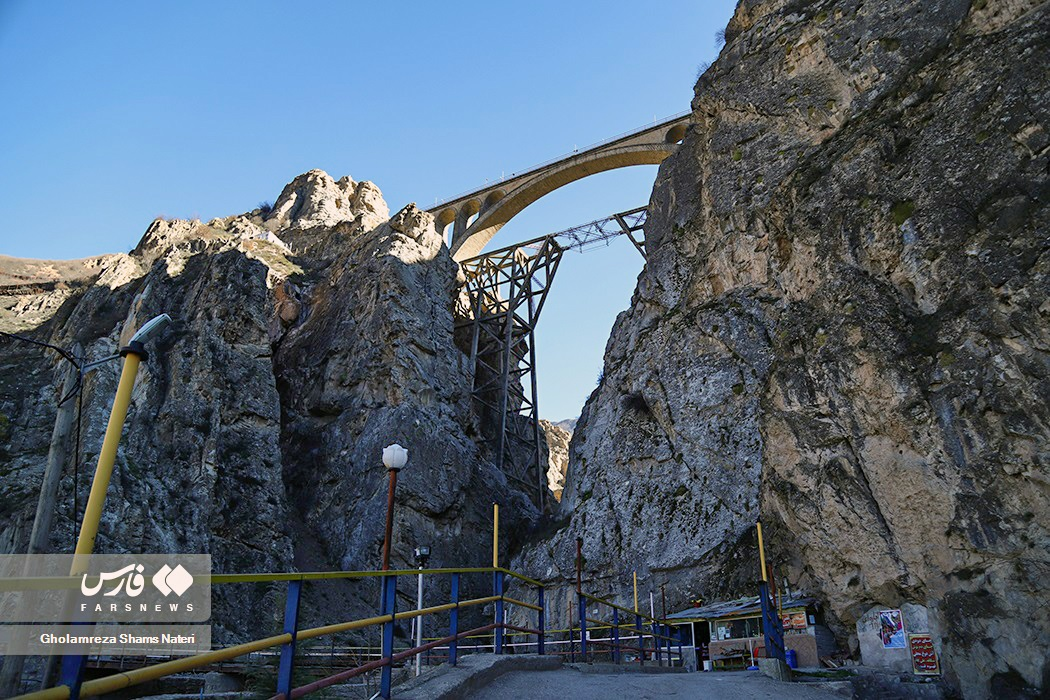

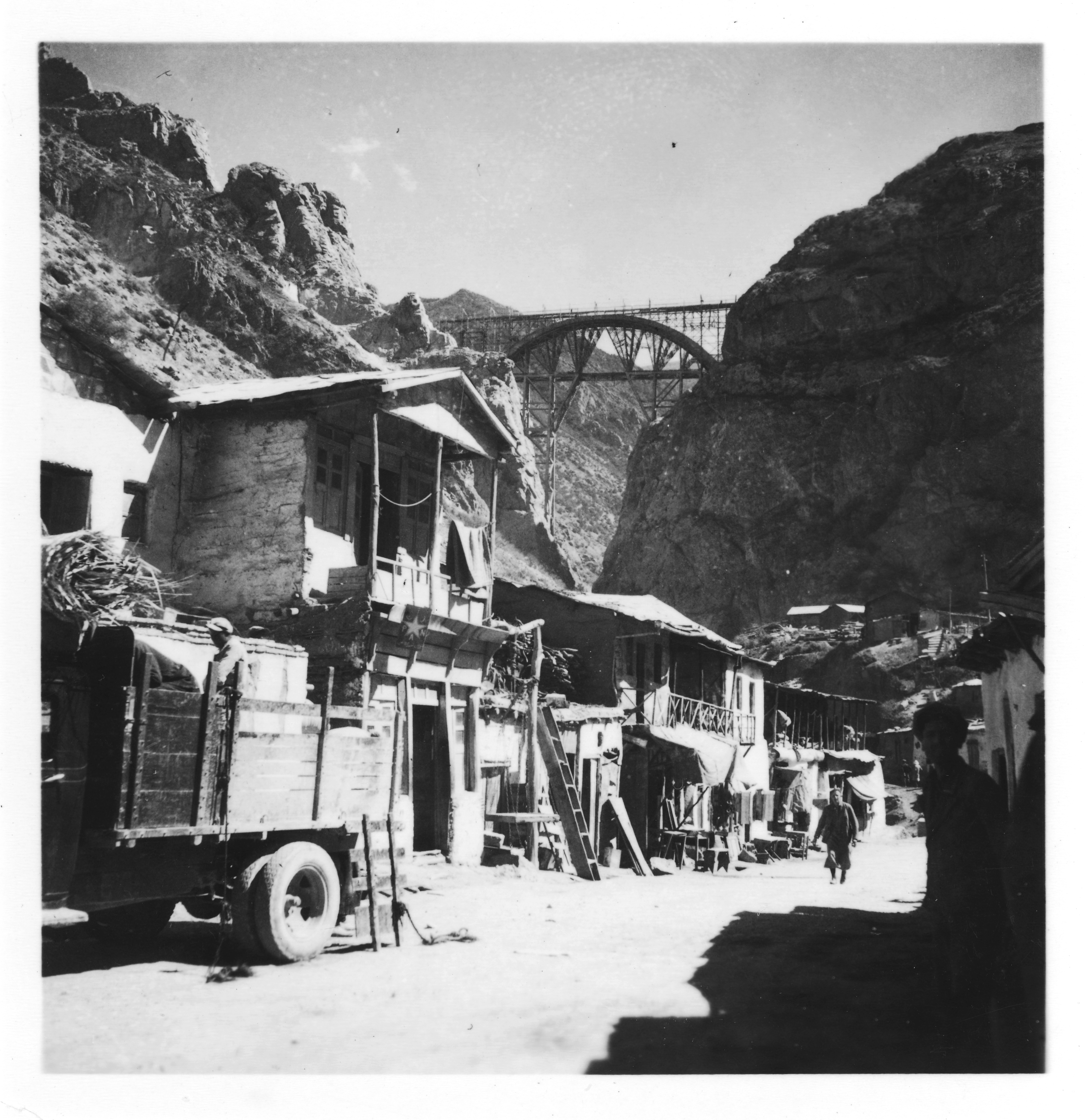
