= Kampsax =

Geographic information systems, mapping and road construction firm

Kampsax A/S was a Danish engineering firm. Kampsax was established November 1, 1917 by Per Kampmann, Otto Kierulff and Jørgen Saxild. In 2002 it was bought by COWI A/S. Kampsax was world renowned for geographic information systems, mapping and road construction.

== See more ==
- Veresk Bridge
