= Spiling =

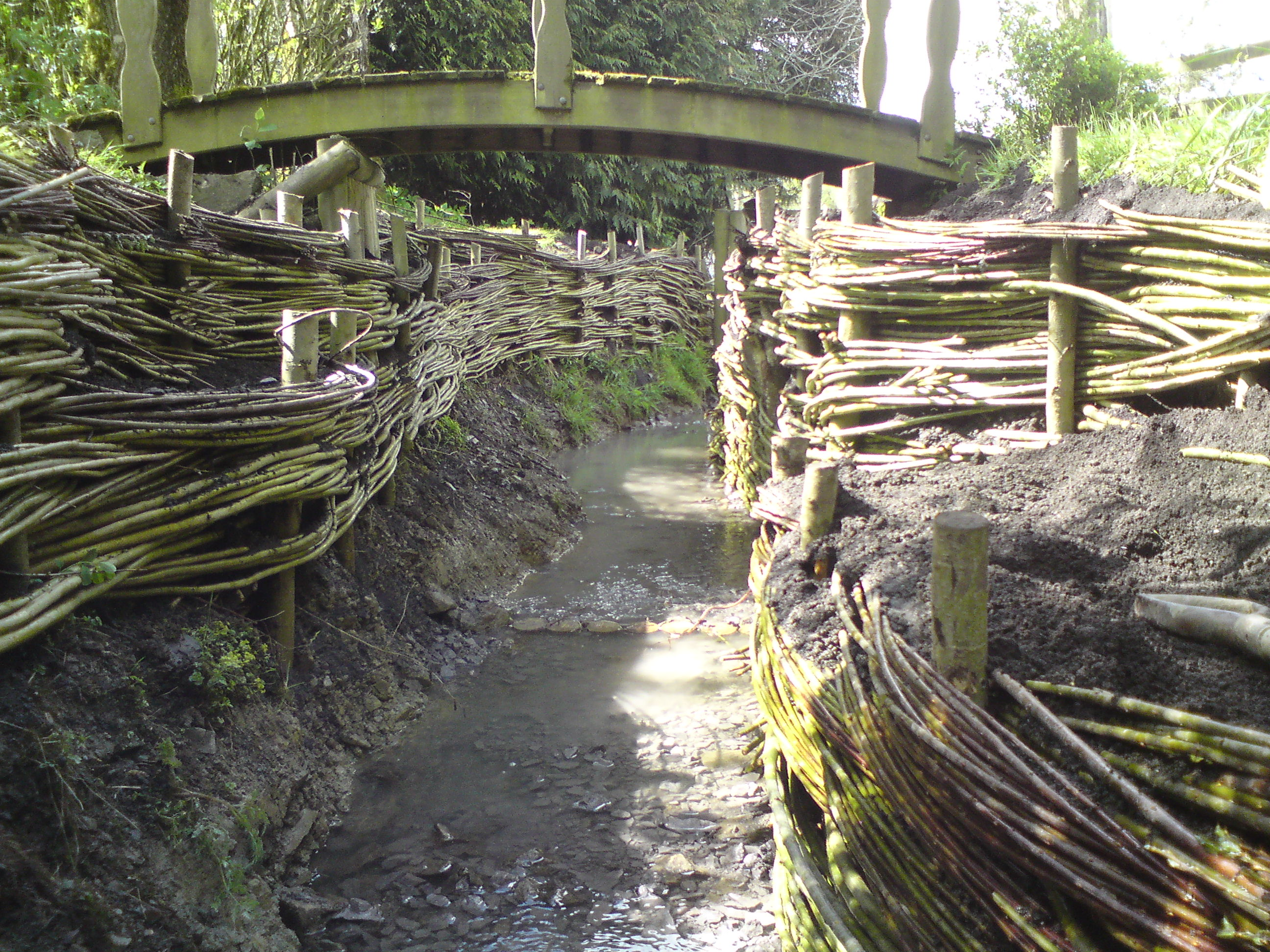
Willow spiling in Wales

Spiling is a traditional technique used in temperate regions of the world for the prevention of erosion to river and stream banks.

Willow spiling is currently used in the United Kingdom; live willow rods are woven between live willow uprights and the area behind is filled with soil for the willow to root into.

Kipling's poem The Land mentions it: "They spiled along the water-course with trunks of willow-trees, And planks of elms behind 'em and immortal oaken knees."

The species of willow used are riparian (associated with rivers); the posts, 10 centimetres (4 in) in diameter, are usually Salix alba or S. fragilis, and S. viminalis varieties are used for the interwoven rods. The living willow posts are driven into the bank, to a depth of 30 centimetres (1 ft) or more, at 60-centimetre (2 ft) intervals and the thinner rods are woven in between, the rods are best woven at an angle slightly above horizontal to ensure good survival rates. A row of stones, gabions or wooden planks held by posts can be added to the bottom of each "spile" to prevent undercutting when the willow is establishing itself. All works should be done during the dormant period, winter in temperate zones. A layer of seeded coir matting can be pegged onto the soil on top of the spiles to prevent the soil being washed out during flood events. This method is an example of soft engineering, techniques which tend to be less expensive and more sustainable than others.

== See also ==
- Fascine
