= Leopold Müller (engineer) =

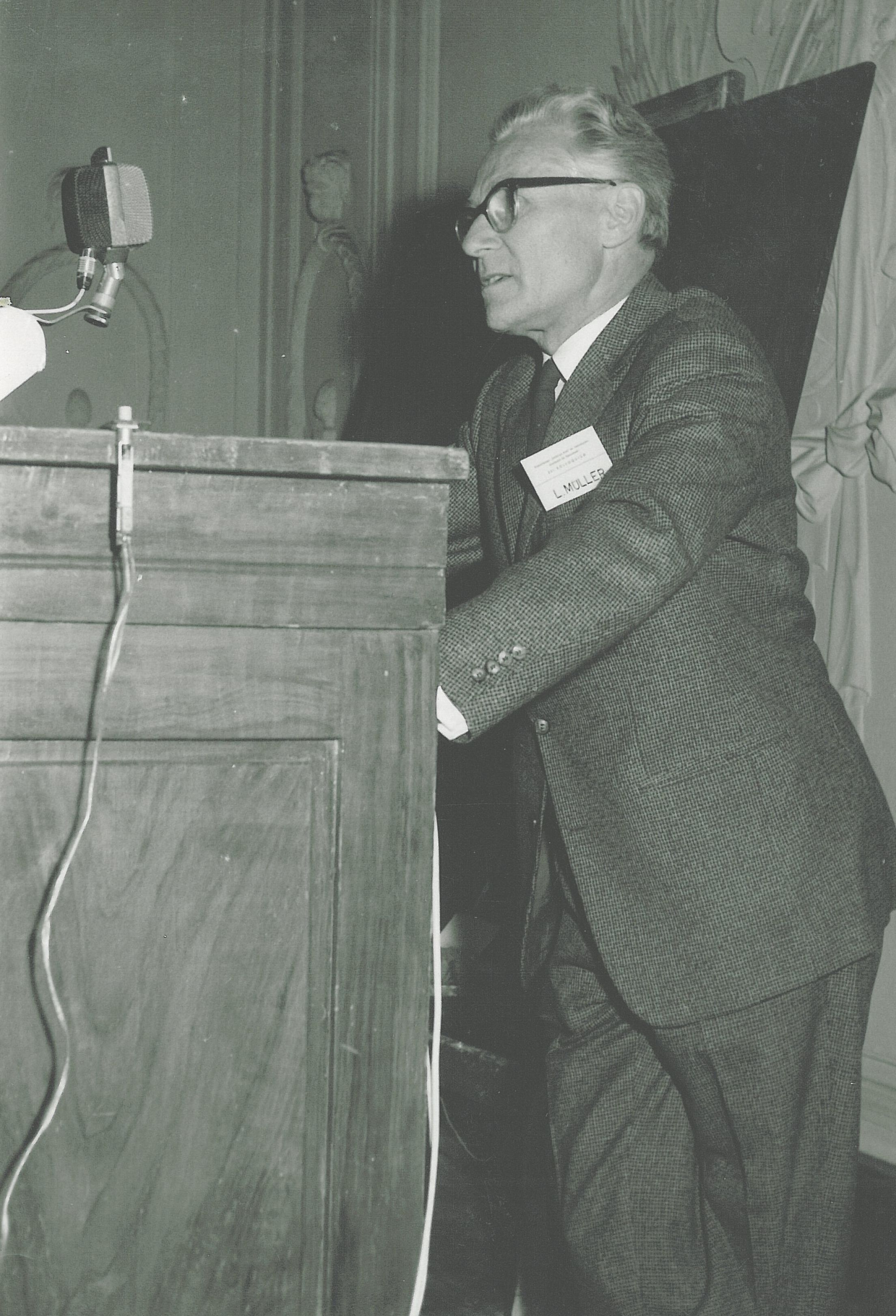
Leopold Müller at the Geomechanik Kolloquium 1966 in Salzburg, Austria

Leopold Müller (born 9 January 1908 in Salzburg, died 1 August 1988 in Salzburg) was a geologist, one of the pioneers of rock mechanics and one of the main contributors to the development of the new Austrian tunneling method (NATM).

Müller opined, that the northern flank of the 1,900 meter high Monte Toc was not stable enough to withstand a reservoir with up to 150 million cubic meters of water when the Vajont dam was planned.
