= Ladislaus von Rabcewicz =

Austrian engineer and professor at Vienna University of Technology (1893-1975)

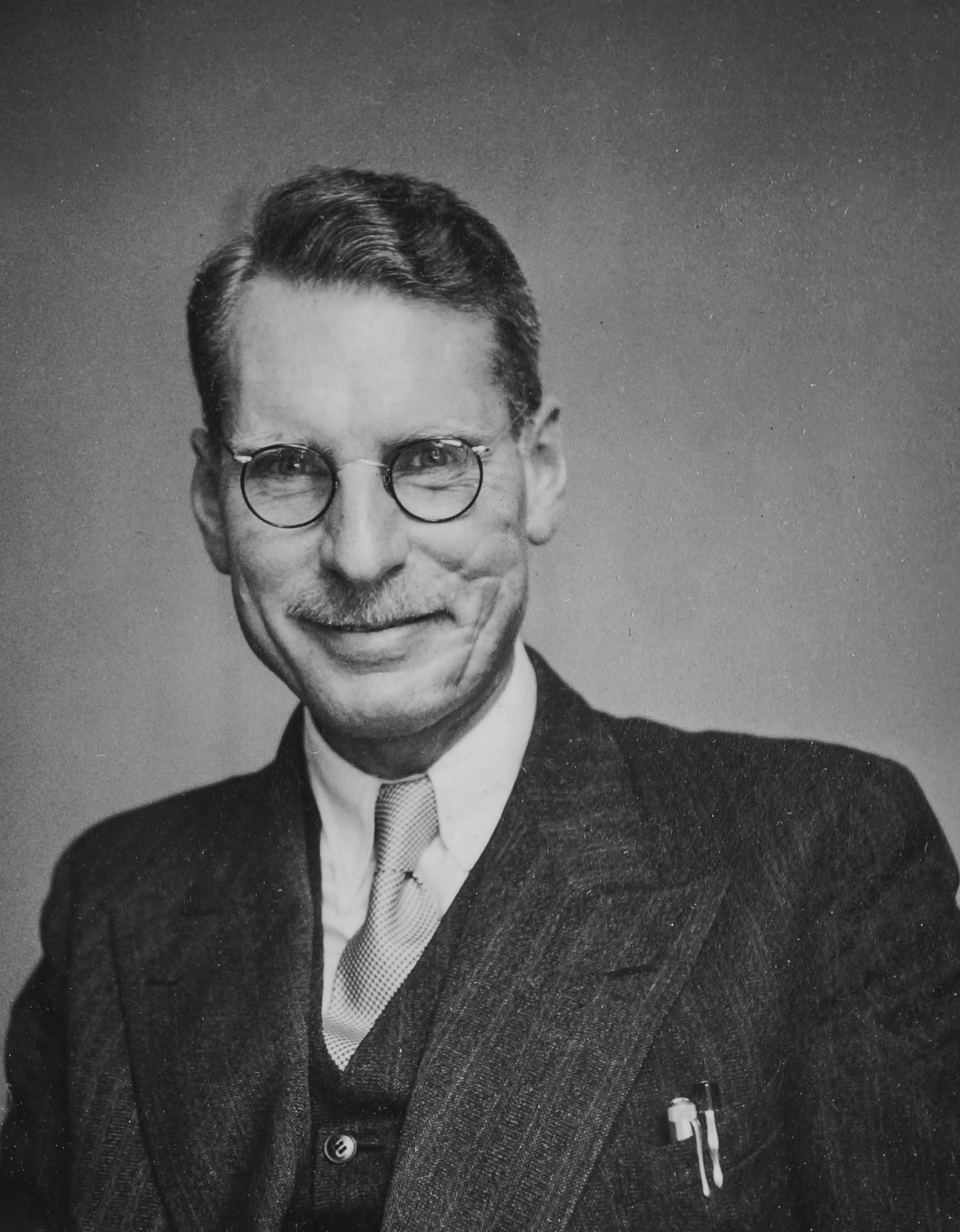
Prof. Ladislaus v. Rabcewicz

Ladislaus von Rabcewicz (12 June 1893 in Kungota, nearby Maribor – 19 December 1975) was an Austrian engineer and university professor at the Vienna University of Technology. He is notable for being one of three men who developed the new Austrian tunneling method (NATM).

He lived in Iran along with his family to build Veresk Bridge in Savadkooh, Mazandaran.

== Awards ==
- Wilhelm Exner Medal in 1975.
