= Rock mass classification =

Rock mass classification systems are used for various engineering design and stability analysis. These are based on empirical relations between rock mass parameters and engineering applications, such as tunnels, slopes, foundations, and excavatability. The first rock mass classification system in geotechnical engineering was proposed in 1946 for tunnels with steel set support.

== Design methods ==
In engineering in rock, three design strategies can be distinguished: analytical, empirical, and numerical. Empirical, i.e. rock mass classification, methods are extensively used for feasibility and pre-design studies, and often also for the final design.

== Objectives ==
The objectives of rock mass classifications are (after Bieniawski 1989):

1. Identify the most significant parameters influencing the behaviour of a rock mass.
2. Divide a particular rock mass formulation into groups of similar behaviour – rock mass classes of varying quality.
3. Provide a basis of understanding the characteristics of each rock mass class
4. Relate the experience of rock conditions at one site to the conditions and experience encountered at others
5. Derive quantitative data and guidelines for engineering design
6. Provide common basis for communication between engineers and geologists

=== Benefits ===
The main benefits of rock mass classifications:

1. Improve the quality of site investigations by calling for the minimum input data as classification parameters.
2. Provide quantitative information for design purposes.
3. Enable better engineering judgement and more effective communication on a project.
4. Provide a basis for understanding the characteristics of each rock mass

== Rock mass classification systems ==
=== Systems for tunneling: Quantitative ===
- Rock Mass Rating (RMR)
- Q-system
- Geological Strength Index
- Mining rock mass rating (MRMR)

=== Other systems: Qualitative ===
- Size Strength classification

=== Systems for slope engineering ===
- Slope Mass Rating (SMR), Continuous Slope Mass Rating and Graphical Slope Mass Rating
- Rock mass classification system for rock slopes
- Slope Stability Probability Classification (SSPC)
- Q-slope

=== Earlier systems ===
- Rock load classification method

The Rock load classification method is one of the first methodologies for rock mass classification for engineering. Karl von Terzaghi developed the methodology for tunnels supported by steel sets in the 1940s. By many regarded as obsolete as ideas about rock and rock mass mechanical behavior have since further developed and the methodology is not suitable for modern tunneling methods using shotcrete and rock bolts.
Reference: Terzaghi, K. (1946). "Rock defects and loads on tunnel supports". In Proctor, R.V.; White, T. (eds.). Rock Tunnelling with Steel Supports. Youngstown, Ohio: Commercial Shearing and Stamping Co. pp. 15–99. also in Soil Mechanics Series 25, publication 418. Harvard University, Graduate School of Engineering.

- Stand-up time classification

The Stand-up time classification by Lauffer is often regarded as the origin of the New Austrian Tunnelling Method (NATM). The original system as developed by Lauffer is nowadays by many regarded as obsolete but his ideas are incorporated in modern rock mechanics science, such as the relation between the span of a tunnel and the stand-up time, and notably in the New Austrian Tunnelling Method.
Reference: Lauffer, H. (1958). "Gebirgsklassifizierung für den Stollenbau" [Mountain classification for the gallery construction]. Geology Bauwesen (in German). 74 (1): 46–51.

- Rock Quality Designation

The Rock Quality Designation index was developed by Deere in the 1960s to classify the quality of a rock core based on the integrity of borehole cores. Nowadays the classification system itself is not very often used, but the determination of the RQD as index for rock core quality is standard practice in any geotechnical rock drilling, and is used in many, more recent, rock mass classification systems, such as RMR and Q-system (see above).

- Rock Structure Rating (RSR)

The Rock Structure Rating system is a quantitative method for describing quality of a rock mass and appropriate ground support, in particular, for steel-rib support, developed by Wickham, Tiedemann and Skinner in the 1970s.

== See also ==
- Slope Mass Rating
- Rock mechanics
- Geotechnical investigation
- Geotechnical engineering
- ISRM classification
- Slope stability, Slope stability analysis
- Classification of rocks
