= Q-slope =

The Q-slope method for rock slope engineering and rock mass classification is developed by Barton and Bar. It expresses the quality of the rock mass for slope stability using the Q-slope value, from which long-term stable, reinforcement-free slope angles can be derived.

The Q-slope value can be determined with:

$Q_{slope}= \left ( \frac{RQD}{J_n} \right ) \times {\left ( \frac{J_r}{J_a} \right )_0} \times \left ( \frac{J_{wice}}{SRF_{slope}} \right )$

Q-slope utilizes similar parameters to the Q-system which has been used for over 40 years in the design of ground support for tunnels and underground excavations. The first four parameters, RQD (rock quality designation), J_{n} (joint set number), J_{r} (joint roughness number) and J_{a} (joint alteration number) are the same as in the Q-system. However, the frictional resistance pair J_{r} and J_{a} can apply, when needed, to individual sides of a potentially unstable wedges. Simply applied orientation factors (_{0}), like (J_{r}/J_{a})_{1}x0.7 for set J_{1} and (J_{r}/J_{a})_{2}x0.9 for set J_{2}, provide estimates of overall whole-wedge frictional resistance reduction, if appropriate. The Q-system term J_{w} is replaced with J_{wice}, and takes into account a wider range of environmental conditions appropriate to rock slopes, which are exposed to the environment indefinitely. The conditions include the extremes of erosive intense rainfall, ice wedging, as may seasonally occur at opposite ends of the rock-type and regional spectrum. There are also slope-relevant SRF (strength reduction factor) categories.

Multiplication of these terms results in the Q-slope value, which can range between 0.001 (exceptionally poor) to 1000 (exceptionally good) for different rock masses.

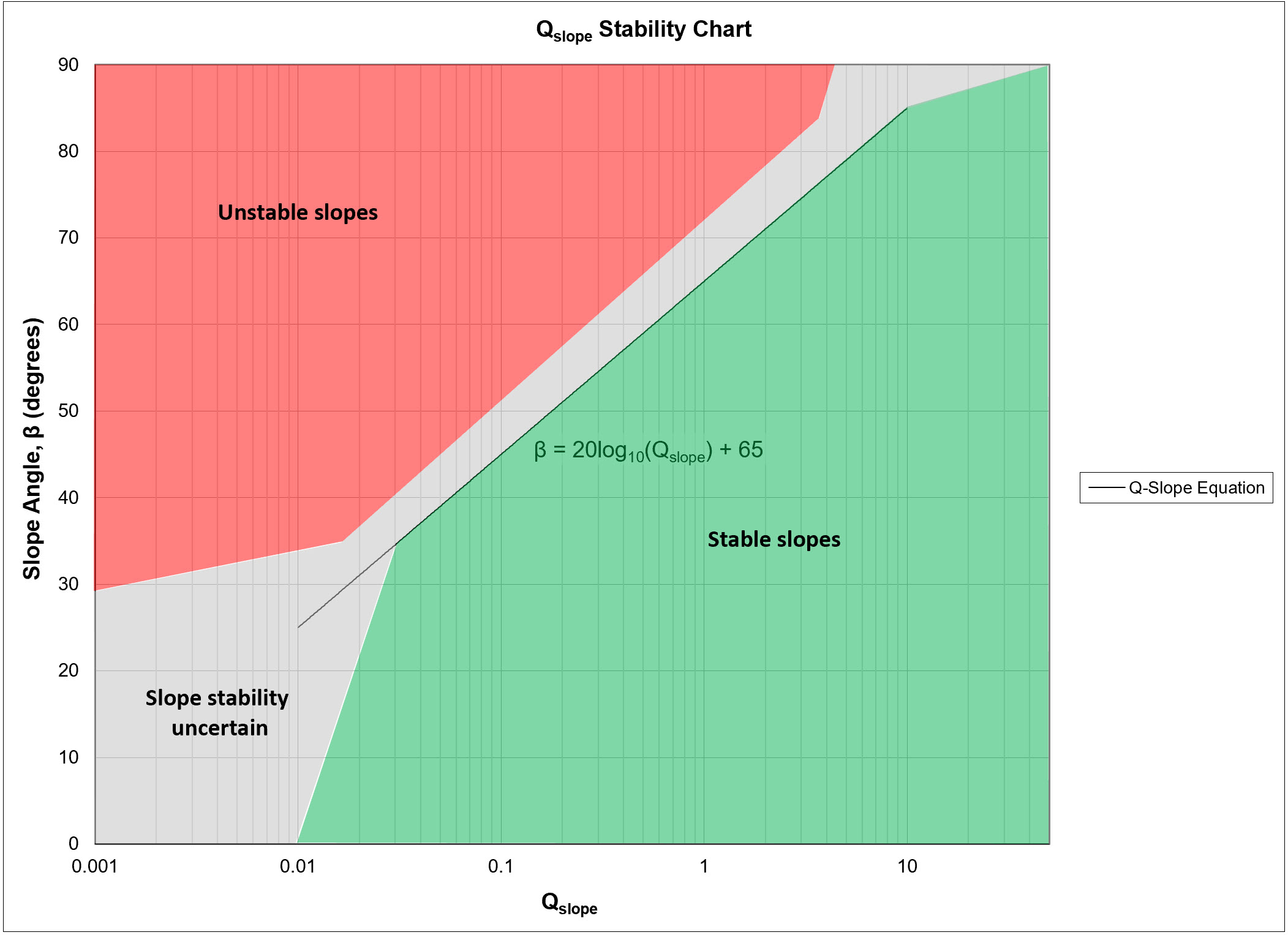
Q-Slope Stability Chart

A simple formula for the steepest slope angle (β), in degrees, not requiring reinforcement or support is given by:

$\beta = 20\log_{10}Q_{slope}+65^\circ$

Q-slope is intended for use in reinforcement-free site access road cuts, roads or railway cuttings, or individual benches in open cast mines. It is based on over 500 case studies in slopes ranging from 35 to 90 degrees in fresh hard rock slopes as well as weak, weathered and saprolitic rock slopes. Q-slope has also been applied in slopes with interbedded strata, in faulted rocks and fault zones, and in alpine and Arctic environments, which are susceptible to freeze-thaw and ice wedging.

Rock slope design techniques have been derived using Q-slope and geophysical survey data, primarily based on V_{p} (P-wave velocity).

Q-slope has been applied in conjunction with remote sensing (aerial photogrammetry) to assess slope stability in hazardous and 'out-of-reach' natural and excavated slopes.

Q-slope is not intended as a substitute for conventional and more detailed slope stability analyses, where these are warranted.

Q-slope has been correlated with other rock mass classifications including BQ, RHRS, and SMR.

== See also ==
- Slope failure
- Rockfall
- SMR classification
