= Q-system (geotechnical engineering) =

For the linguistics formalism, see Q-systems.
For the genetic method, see Q-system (genetics).

The Q-system for rock mass classification is developed by Barton, Lien, and Lunde. It expresses the quality of the rock mass in the so-called Q-value, on which design are based and support recommendations for underground excavations.

The Q-value is determined with

$$Q=\frac{RQD}{J_n} \times \frac{J_r}{J_a} \times \frac{J_w}{SRF}$$

The first term RQD (Rock Quality Designation) divided by J_{n} (joint set number) is related to the size of the intact rock blocks in the rock mass. The second term J_{r} (joint roughness number) divided by J_{a} (joint alteration number) is related to the shear strength along the discontinuity planes and the third term J_{w} (joint water parameter) divided by SRF (stress reduction factor) is related to the stress environment on the intact rock blocks and discontinuities around the underground excavation.

A multiplication of the three terms results in the Q parameter, which can range between 0.001 for an exceptionally poor to 1000 for an exceptionally good rock mass. The numerical values of the class boundaries for the different rock mass qualities are subdivisions of the Q range on a logarithmic scale.

The Q-value determines the quality of the rock mass, but the support of an underground excavation is based not only on the Q-value but is also determined by the different terms in the above equation. This leads to a very extensive list of classes for support recommendations.

== See also ==
- Rock Structure Rating
- Hoek-Brown failure criterion
- Rock mass rating
