= Alexander Puzrin =

Swiss geotechnical engineering professor

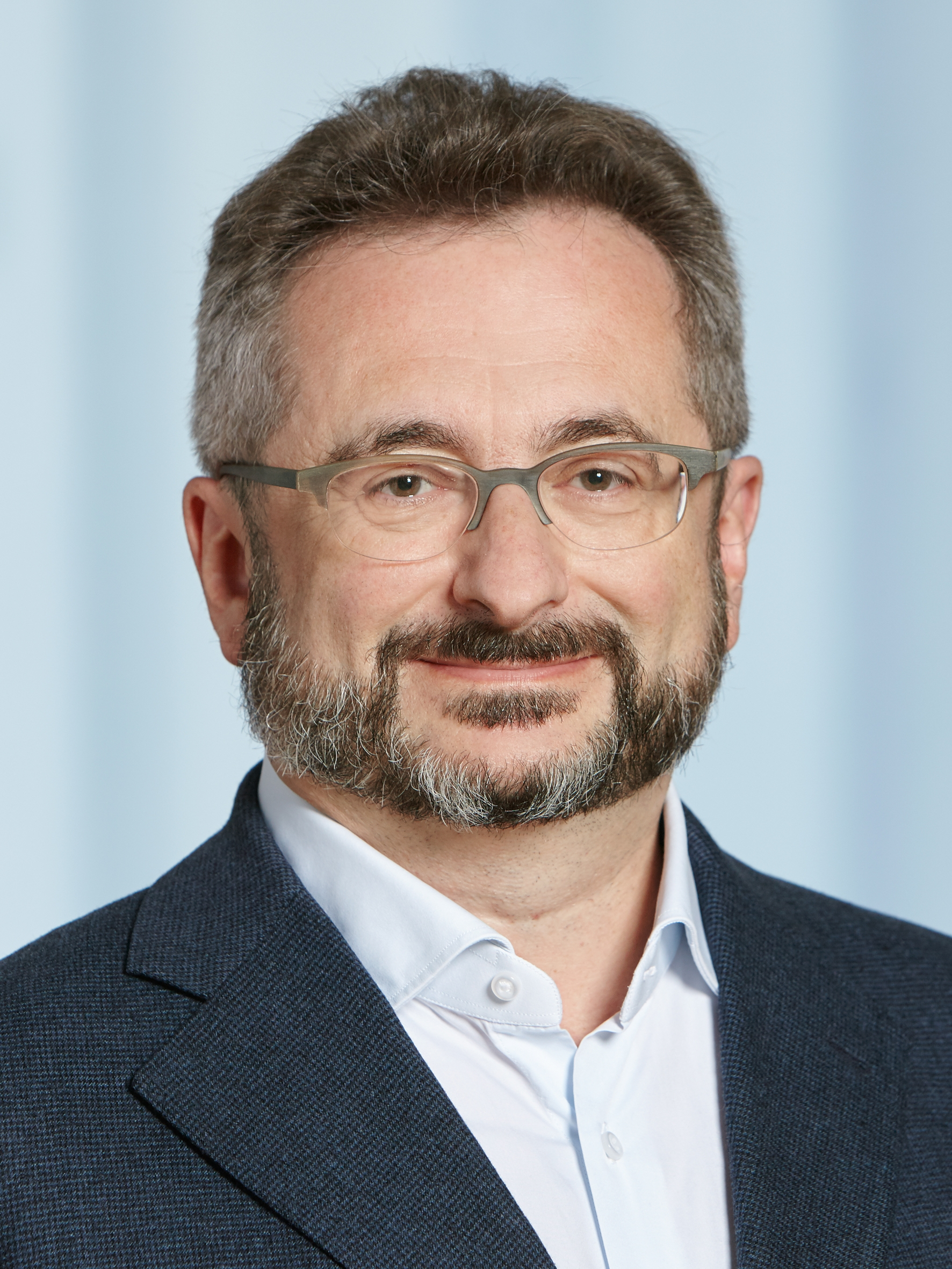
- Alexander M. Puzrin (2020)
- Born: 24 July 1965 (age 61)
- Education: Technion – Israel Institute of Technology
- Known for: Constitutive modeling, Soil mechanics, Landslides
- Scientific career
- Fields: Geotechnical Engineering, Geomechanics
- Workplaces: ETH Zurich
- Thesis: The soft clay behaviour under irregular cyclic loading (1997)
- Doctoral advisor: Samuel Frydman

Alexander M. Puzrin (born 24 July 1965) is professor of geotechnical engineering at ETH Zurich, Switzerland, working in the field of geomechanics.

== Biography ==
Alexander Puzrin completed his undergraduate studies in Structural Engineering in 1987 at the Department of Civil Engineering, Moscow Institute of Civil Engineering, USSR, and received his PhD in Geotechnical Engineering in 1997 from the Department of Civil Engineering, Technion – Israel Institute of Technology, Haifa, Israel. From 1997 to 2001 he was Lecturer, Senior Lecturer and then tenured associate professor at the same institution, and from 2002 to 2004 a tenured associate professor at the Department of Civil and Environmental Engineering, Georgia Tech, Atlanta, United States. Since 2004 he is Full Professor of Geotechnical Engineering at ETH Zurich, Switzerland.

== Research ==
The focus of Puzrin's research is on constitutive modeling of geomaterials and on the analysis of progressive and catastrophic failure in soils, with applications to creeping terrestrial and tsunamigenic submarine landslides. His interests include applications of novel sensor technologies to geotechnical monitoring and the development of innovative chemical and biological soil-improvement techniques. He has been involved as an expert and consultant in large-scale geotechnical projects in the UK, the US, Russia, Mexico, Azerbaijan, Israel and Switzerland. He is a co-founder of the ETH Zurich spin-off company Marmota Engineering AG.

== Awards and distinctions ==
Alexander Puzrin's papers were awarded by the British Institution of Civil Engineers with Geotechnical Research Medals in 2004 and 2013, the 2013 George Stephenson Medal, the 2018 David Hislop Award, the Overseas Prize (Mokshagundam Visvesvaraya Award) in 2022, and the 2023 Environmental Geotechnics Award. In 2019, he received the Geomaterials Research Medal of the Alliance of Laboratories in Europe for Education, Research and Technology (ALERT).

In addition, he served as the Editor of the international journal Géotechnique from 2012 to 2015. Since 2014, he is a Fellow of the Institution of Civil Engineers. He was a recipient of the ETH Zurich Excellence in Teaching Award in 2009 and 2013. In 2025, he was elected the President of the Swiss Geotechnical Society (Geotechnik Schweiz).

Puzrin also developed an original passive geothermal air cooling system for the pavilion of the Kingdom of Bahrain at the Venice Biennale of Architecture 2025, which won the Golden Lion for Best National Participation.
