= Rock Structure Rating =

Rock Structure Rating (RSR) is a quantitative method for describing quality of a rock mass and appropriate ground support, in particular, for steel-rib support, developed by Wickham, Tiedemann and Skinner.

The RSR concept introduced a rating system for rock masses. It was the sum of weighted values in this classification system. There are considered two general categories:

- geotechnical parameters:

rock type; joint pattern; joint orientations; type of discontinuities; major faults; shears and folds; rock material properties; weathering or alteration. and

- construction parameters:

size of tunnel; direction of drive; method of excavation.

The RSR value of any tunnel section is obtained by summing the weighted numerical values determined for each parameter. The RSR concept is a very useful method for selecting steel rib support for rock tunnels. As with any empirical approach one should not apply the concept beyond the range of the sufficient and reliable data used for developing it. For this reason the RSR concept is not recommended for selection of rock bolts and concrete support.

== See also ==
- Core recovery parameters
- Hoek-Brown failure criterion
- Rock mass classification
