= Geological Strength Index =

Index used in geology

The Geological Strength Index (GSI) system, proposed in 1994 by Evert Hoek, is used for the estimation of the rock mass strength and the rock mass deformation modulus.

The GSI system concentrates on the description of two factors, rock structure and block surface conditions. The guidelines given by the GSI system are for the estimation of the peak strength parameters of jointed rock masses. There are no guidelines given by the GSI, or by any other system, for the estimation of the rock mass’ residual strength that yield consistent results.

Another method is that defined in the work of Cole & Stroud whereby the basic strength, in Newtons, and the shear strength in Kg/cm2, can be estimated empirically by varied responses to hammer, knife & finger nail.
