= Size Strength classification =

Two-parameter rock mass classification

In geology, size strength classification is a two-parameter rock classification based on the strength of intact rock and the spacing of discontinuities in the rock mass. It was developed by Louis and Franklin (1970–75).

The size-strength approach to rock mass characterisation has been found helpful in various mining and civil engineering applications.

The concept of block size is analogous to that of grain size but on macroscopic scale. The rock is considered as a conglomerate of discrete intact blocks bounded by joints. The behaviour of this conglomerate depends on the size and strength of a typical block.

Block size is defined as the average diameter of a typical rock block in the unit to be classified. On the surface block size is measured by observing exposed rock surface. Underground block size is measured from drill cores. The intact strength of the rock material may be estimated by using a rock hammer.
