= Evert Hoek =

Zimbabwean-Canadian engineer (1933–2024)

Evert Hoek (23 August 1933 – 6 July 2024) was a Zimbabwean-Canadian mechanical engineer specializing in geotechnical engineering and a leading international expert in rock mechanics.

== Life and career ==
Hoek was born in Southern Rhodesia on 23 August 1933. He began his research for Rock Mechanics in 1958 (due to problems with brittle rock in deep gold mines in South Africa) and in 1965 at the University of Cape Town PhD (rock fracture under static stress conditions). From 1965, he was at Imperial College, where he set up one faculty-wide center for rock mechanics at the Royal School of Mines. He developed there, among others in 1968, a triaxial test for Rock Mechanics. Later, he became a professor at the University of Toronto in 1975 for twelve years as a senior consulting engineer at Golder Associates (where he was Senior Principal and Chairman) in Vancouver, then an independent consulting engineer with a private engineering firm in Vancouver.

Hoek was elected a member of the National Academy of Engineering in 2006 for major worldwide contributions in the development and application of rational design procedures for engineered systems in rock. He was also a Fellow of the Royal Academy of Engineering and the Canadian Academy of Engineering. He received a doctorate degree (D. Sc.) from the University of London and honorary doctorates in the University of Toronto and the University of Waterloo. He received the first prize of the Mueller International Society of Rock Mechanics and was the 1983 Rankine Lecturer (Strength of jointed rock masses) and 2000 Terzaghi Lecturer (Big tunnels in bad rock). Hoek published more than 100 papers and 3 books. His classic Rock Slope Engineering has been updated by Duncan Wyllie to a 5th edition, published by CRC Press in 2017. He died on 6 July 2024, at the age of 90.

== See also ==
- Hoek–Brown failure criterion
