= Rock bolt =

Long anchor bolt, for stabilizing rock excavations

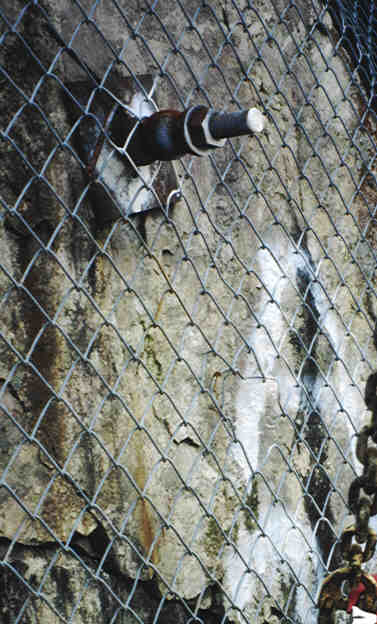
Rock bolt holding chain link fabric

A rock bolt is a long anchor bolt, for stabilizing rock excavations, which may be used in tunnels or rock cuts. It transfers load from the unstable exterior to the confined (and much stronger) interior of the rock mass.

Rock bolts were first used in mining in the 1890s, with systematic use documented at the St Joseph Lead Mine in the U.S. in the 1920s. Rock bolts were applied to civil tunneling support in the U.S. and in Australia starting in the late 1940s. Rock bolts were used and further developed starting in 1947 by Australian engineers who began experimenting with four-meter-long expanding anchor rock bolts while working on the Snowy Mountains Scheme.

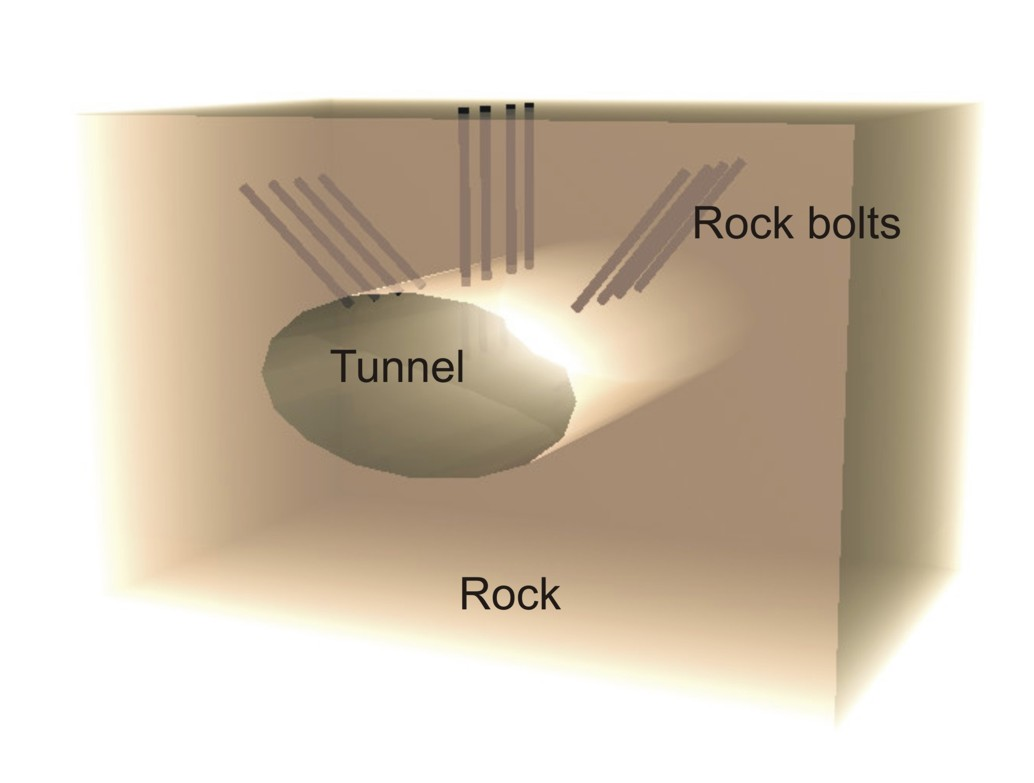
Typical rock bolting pattern for a tunnel

As shown in the figure, rock bolts are almost always installed in a pattern, the design of which depends on the rock quality designation and the type of excavation. Rock bolts are an essential component of the New Austrian Tunneling method. As with anchor bolts, there are many proprietary rock bolt designs, with either a mechanical or epoxy means of establishing the set. There are also fiberglass bolts which can be cut through again by subsequent excavation. Many papers have been written on methods of rock bolt design.

Rock bolts work by 'knitting' the rock mass together sufficiently before it can move enough to loosen and fail by unraveling (piece by piece). As shown in the photo, rock bolts may be used to support wire mesh, but this is usually a small part of their function. Unlike common anchor bolts, rock bolts can become 'seized' throughout their length by small shears in the rock mass, so they are not fully dependent on their pull-out strength. This has become an item of controversy in the Big Dig project, which used the much lighter pull-out tests for rock bolts rather than the proper tests for concrete anchor bolts.

Rock bolts can also be used to prevent rockfall.

A video on mining safely using rock bolts.
