= Slope mass rating =

Classification scheme of rock strength

Slope mass rating (SMR) is a rock mass classification scheme developed by Manuel Romana to describe the strength of an individual rock outcrop or slope. The system is founded upon the more widely used RMR scheme, which is modified with quantitative guidelines to the rate the influence of adverse joint orientations (e.g. joints dipping steeply out of the slope).

Slope mass rating has been widely used worldwide. It has been included in the technical regulations of some countries as a classification system by itself or as a quality index for rocky slopes (e.g., India, Serbia, Italy). It has also been used in more than 50 countries across five continents, especially in Asia (e.g., China and India), where its use is very common.

== Definition ==
Rock mass classification schemes are designed to account for a number of factors influencing the strength and deformability of a rock mass (e.g. joint orientations, fracture density, intact strength), and may be used to quantify the competence of an outcrop or particular geologic material. Scores typically range from 0 to 100, with 100 being the most competent rock mass. The term rock mass incorporates the influence of both intact material and discontinuities on the overall strength and behavior of a discontinuous rock medium. While it is relatively straightforward to test the mechanical properties of either intact rock or joints individually, describing their interaction is difficult and several empirical rating schemes (such as RMR and SMR) are available for this purpose.

=== SMR index calculation ===
SMR uses the same first five scoring categories as RMR:

1. Uniaxial compressive strength of intact rock,
2. Rock Quality Designation (or RQD),
3. Joint spacing,
4. Joint condition (the sum of five sub-scores), and
5. Groundwater conditions.

The final sixth category is a rating adjustment or penalization for adverse joint orientations, which is particularly important for evaluating the competence of a rock slope. SMR provides quantitative guidelines to evaluate this rating penalization in the form of four sub-categories, three that describe the relative rock slope and joint set geometries and a fourth which accounts for the method of slope excavation. SMR addresses both planar sliding and toppling failure modes, no additional consideration was made originally for sliding on multiple joint planes. However, Anbalagan et al. adapted the original classification for wedge failure mode.

The final SMR rating is obtained by means of next expression:

$SMR = RMR_b+F_1 \times F_2 \times F_3 + F_4$

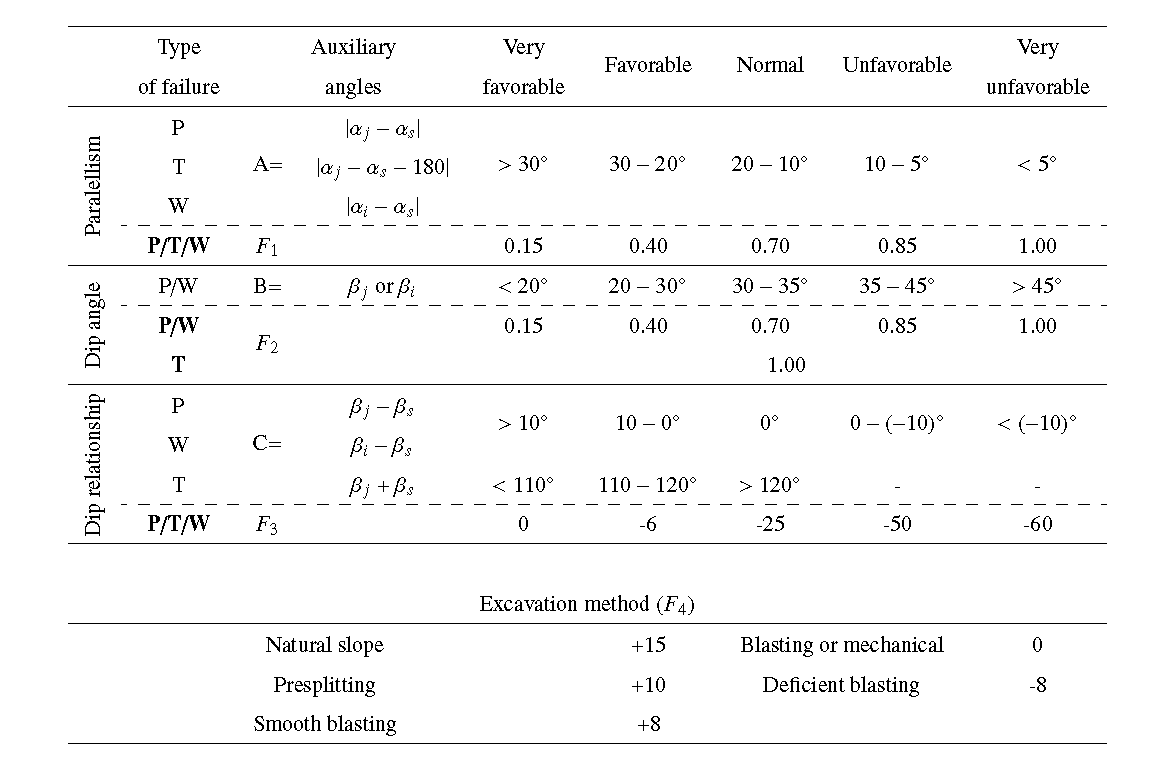
Adjustment factors for SMR. P: planar failure; T: toppling failure; W: wedge failure. Modified from and

where:

- RMR_{b} is the RMR index resulting from Bieniawski's Rock Mass Classification without any correction.
- F_{1} depends on the parallelism between discontinuity, α_{j} (or the intersection line, α_{i}, in the case of wedge failure) and slope dip direction.
- F_{2} depends on the discontinuity dip (β_{j}) in the case of planar failure and the plunge, β_{i} of the intersection line in wedge failure. As regards toppling failure, this parameter takes the value 1.0. This parameter is related to the probability of discontinuity shear strength.
- F_{3} depends on the relationship between slope (β_{s}) and discontinuity (β_{j}) dips (toppling or planar failure cases) or the immersion line dip (β_{i}) (wedge failure case). This parameter retains the Bieniawski adjustment factors that vary from 0 to −60 points and express the probability of discontinuity outcropping on the slope face for planar and wedge failure.
- F_{4} is a correction factor that depends on the excavation method used.

Although SMR is worldwide used, sometimes some misinterpretations and imprecisions are made when applied. Most of the observed inaccuracies are related to the calculation of the ancillary angular relationships between dips and dip directions of the discontinuities and the slope required to determine F_{1}, F_{2} and F_{3} factors. A comprehensive definition of these angular relationships can be found in.

=== SMR index modifications ===
Continuous SMR (C-SMR)

Tomás et al. proposed alternative continuous functions for the computation of F_{1}, F_{2} and F_{3} correction parameters. These functions show maximum absolute differences with discrete functions lower than 7 points and significantly reduce subjective interpretations. Moreover, the proposed functions for SMR correction factors calculus reduce doubts about what score to assign to values near the border of the discrete classification.

The proposed F_{1} continuous function that best fits discrete values is:

$F_1 = \frac{16}{25}-\frac{3}{500}\arctan \left ( \frac{1}{10} \left ( |A|-17 \right ) \right )$

where parameter A is the angle formed between the discontinuity and the slope strikes for planar and toppling failures modes and the angle formed between the intersection of the two discontinuities (the plunge direction) and the dip direction of the slope for wedge failure. Arctangent function is expressed in degrees.

$$F_2 = \begin{cases}
\frac{9}{16}+\frac{1}{195}\arctan \left ( \frac{17}{100}B - 5 \right ), & \text{for planar and wedge failure} \\
1, & \text{for toppling failure}
\end{cases}$$

where parameter B is the discontinuity dip in degrees for planar failure and the plunge of the intersection for wedge failure. Note that the arctangent function is also expressed in degrees.

$$F_3 = \begin{cases}
-30 + \frac{1}{3}\arctan C, & \text{for planar and wedge failure} \\
-13-\frac{1}{7}\arctan \left ( C- 120 \right ), & \text{for toppling failure}
\end{cases}$$

where C depends on the relationship between slope and discontinuity dips (toppling or planar failure cases) or the slope dip and the immersion line dip for wedge failure case. Arctangent functions are expressed in degrees.

Graphical SMR (GSMR)

Alternatively, Tomás et al. also proposed a graphical method based on the stereographic representation of the discontinuities and the slope to obtain correction parameters of the SMR (F_{1}, F_{2} and F_{3}). This method allows the SMR correction factors to be easily obtained for a simple slope or for several practical applications as linear infrastructures slopes, open pit mining or trench excavations.

Other adaptations of SMR

Other approaches have been proposed to adapt SMR to different situations as high slopes, flysch formations or even heterogeneous materials.

=== Sensitivity analysis of Slope Mass Rating ===
A four-dimensional visual analysis of SMR geomechanical classification, performed by Tomás et al. by means of the Worlds within Worlds methodology to explore, analyze and visualize the relationship among the main controlling parameters of this geomechanical classification, revealed that several cases exist where the slope-discontinuity geometrical relationship scarcely affects slope stability (i.e. F_{1}×F_{2}×F_{3}≃0), and as a consequence SMR can be computed by correcting basic RMR only with the F_{4} factor using next equation with a maximum error lower than nine points:

$SMR = RMR_b + F_4$

These cases in which the influence of the geometry of the slope and the discontinuities is negligible (i.e. F_{1}×F_{2}×F_{3}≃0) are:

a) For planar failure

- β_{s} < β_{j};
- A value higher than 30º and β_{j} < 20º

b) For wedge failure

- β_{s} < β_{i};
- A value higher than 30º and β_{i}; < 20 °C) For toppling failure
- β_{j} < 30º
- A value higher than 30º
- β_{j}+β_{s} ≤ 120º

Where β_{s} is the angle of the slope, β_{j} is the discontinuity dip, β_{i} is the plunge of the intersection line between two discontinuities and A is the parallelism between the discontinuity (or intersection line for wedges) and slope dip directions.

Considering the previous situations, we can assess that the SMR index is insensitive to the geometrical conditions of the slope for a significant number of plausible discontinuity-slope geometries. In these situations, we can ignore the calculation of factors F_{1}, F_{2}, and F_{3}, which depend on the geometry of the slope and the discontinuities, considering that F_{1} × F_{2} × F_{3} ≃ 0. This insight can be very useful for field engineers and geologists, as it helps provide preliminary acceptable field values of SMR when any of the aforementioned circumstances are identified in the studied slope, resulting in significant time savings.

=== Application of the SMR index ===
SMR index can be calculated through the open source software SMRTool, which permits to compute SMR from the geomechanical data of the rock mass and the orientation of the slope and the discontinuities. This software was used to calculate the SMR index using 3D point clouds.

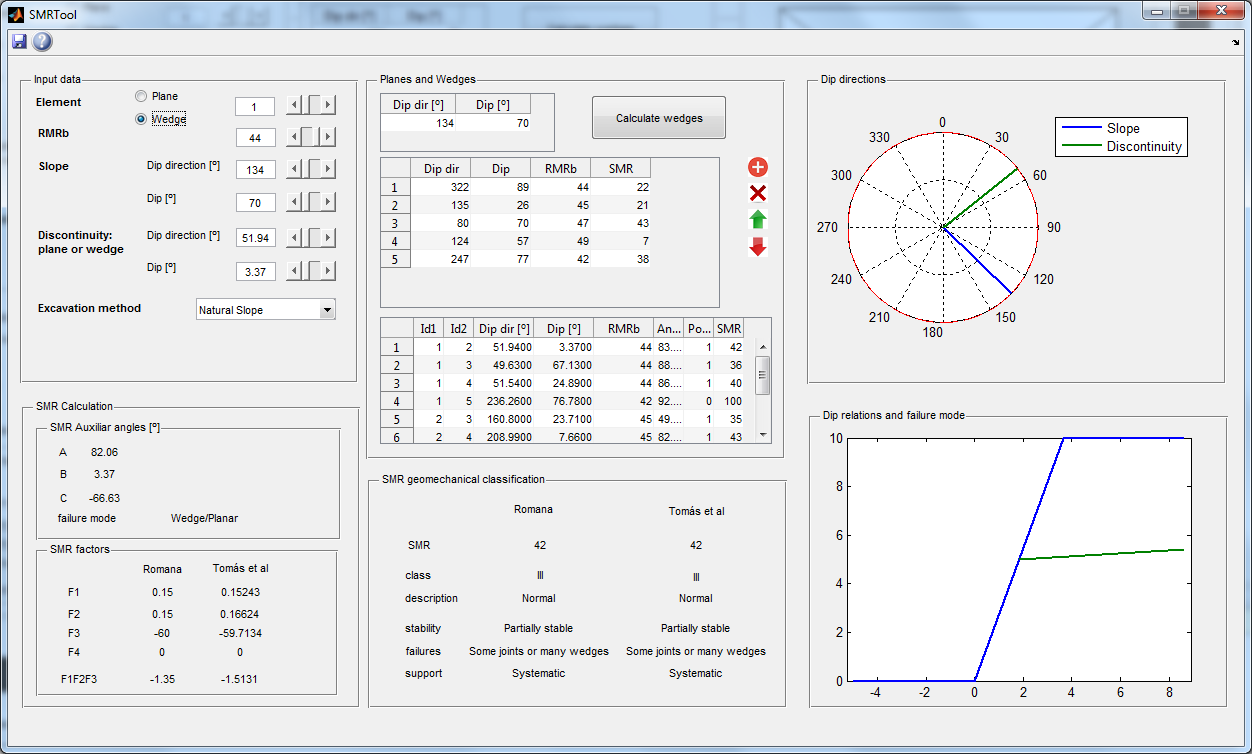
SMRTool is an open source software which aids to calculate the SMR adjustment factors. It depicts the relation between the slope and the discontinuity in order to understand the values of those factors.

Some authors have proposed different methodologies to map the failure susceptibility in rock slopes by computing the SMR index using a Geographical Information System (GIS).

== See also ==
- Slope failure
- Mass wasting
- Rockfall
- Rock mass rating
- Q-slope
