= Rockfall =

Rocks fallen freely from a cliff, roof, or quarry

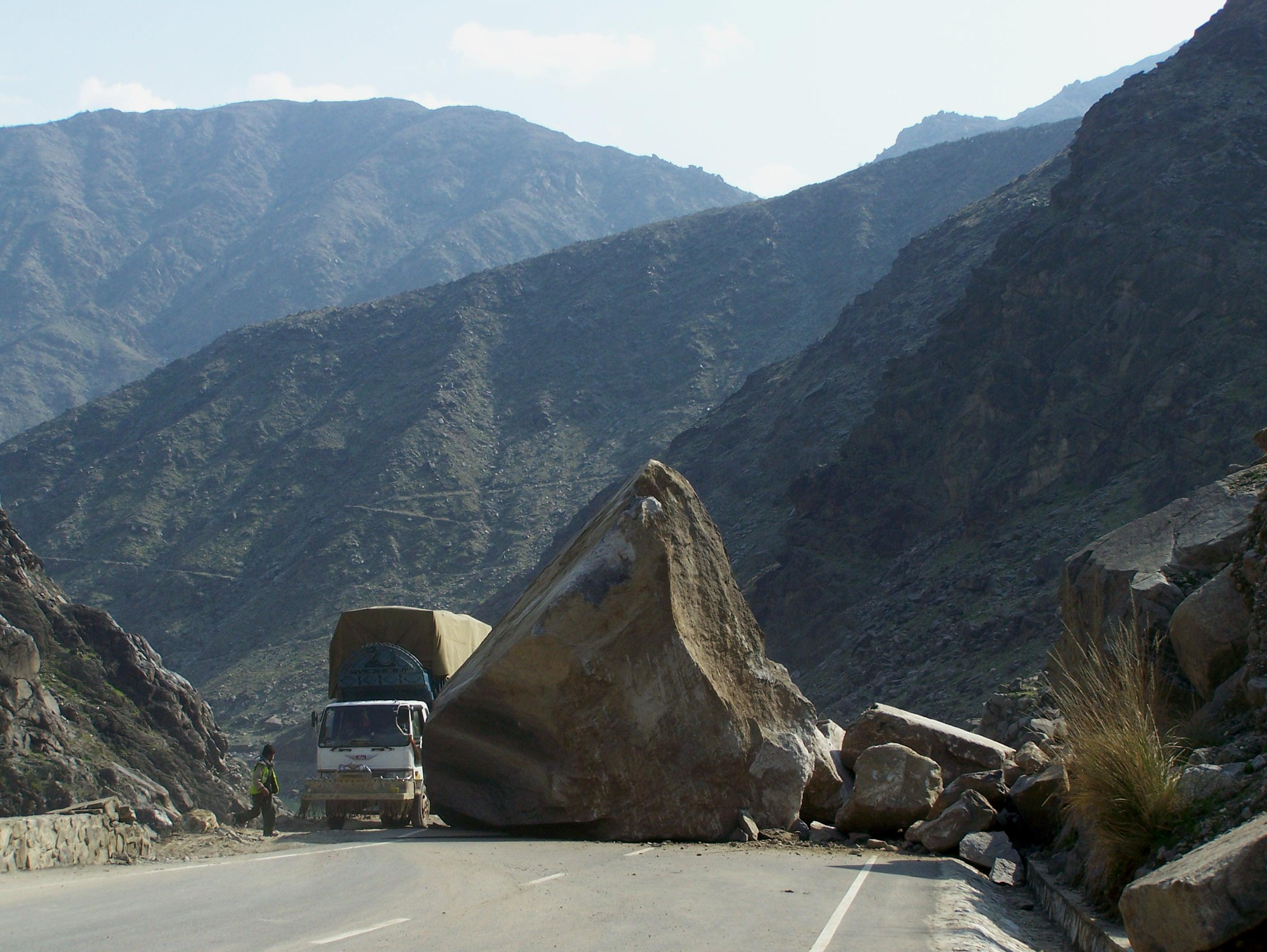
Rockfall deposit, Afghanistan

A rockfall or rock-fall is a quantity of rock that has fallen from a cliff face or from the roof or walls of mine or quarry workings.

== Causal mechanisms ==
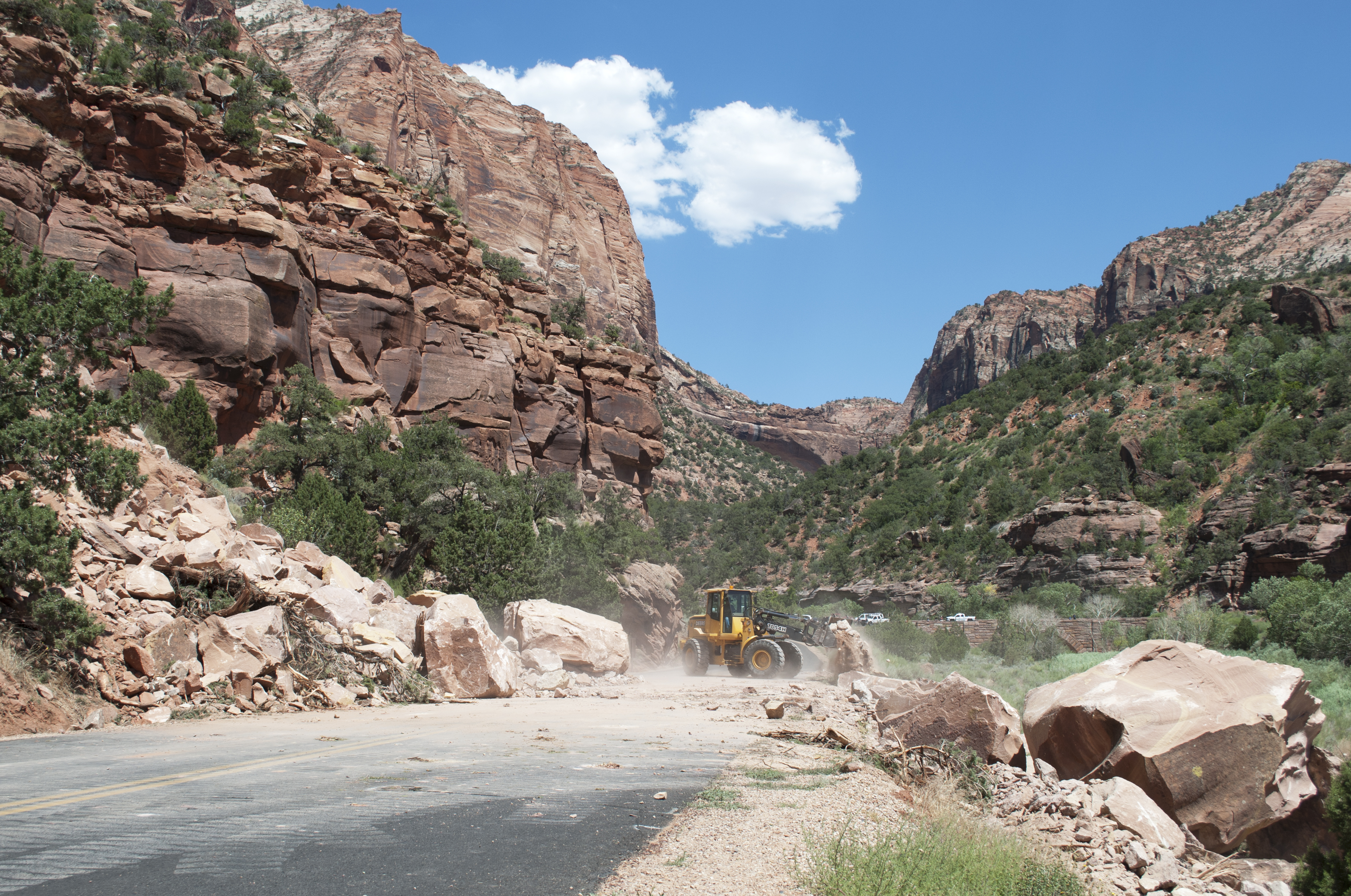
A front-end loader clearing fallen rocks from the Zion-Mount Carmel Highway, Utah, USA

Favourable geology and climate are the principal causal mechanisms of rockfall, factors that include intact condition of the rock mass, discontinuities within the rockmass, weathering susceptibility, ground and surface water, freeze-thaw, root-wedging, and external stresses. A tree may be blown by the wind, and this causes a pressure at the root level and this loosens rocks and can trigger a fall. The pieces of rock collect at the bottom creating a talus or scree. Rocks falling from the cliff may dislodge other rocks and serve to create another mass wasting process, for example an avalanche.

A cliff that has favorable geology to a rockfall may be said to be incompetent. One that is not favorable to a rockfall, which is better consolidated, may be said to be competent.

In higher altitude mountains, rockfalls may be caused by thawing of rock masses with permafrost. In contrast, lower altitude mountains with warmer climates rockfalls may be caused by weathering being enhanced by non-freezing conditions.

== Propagation ==
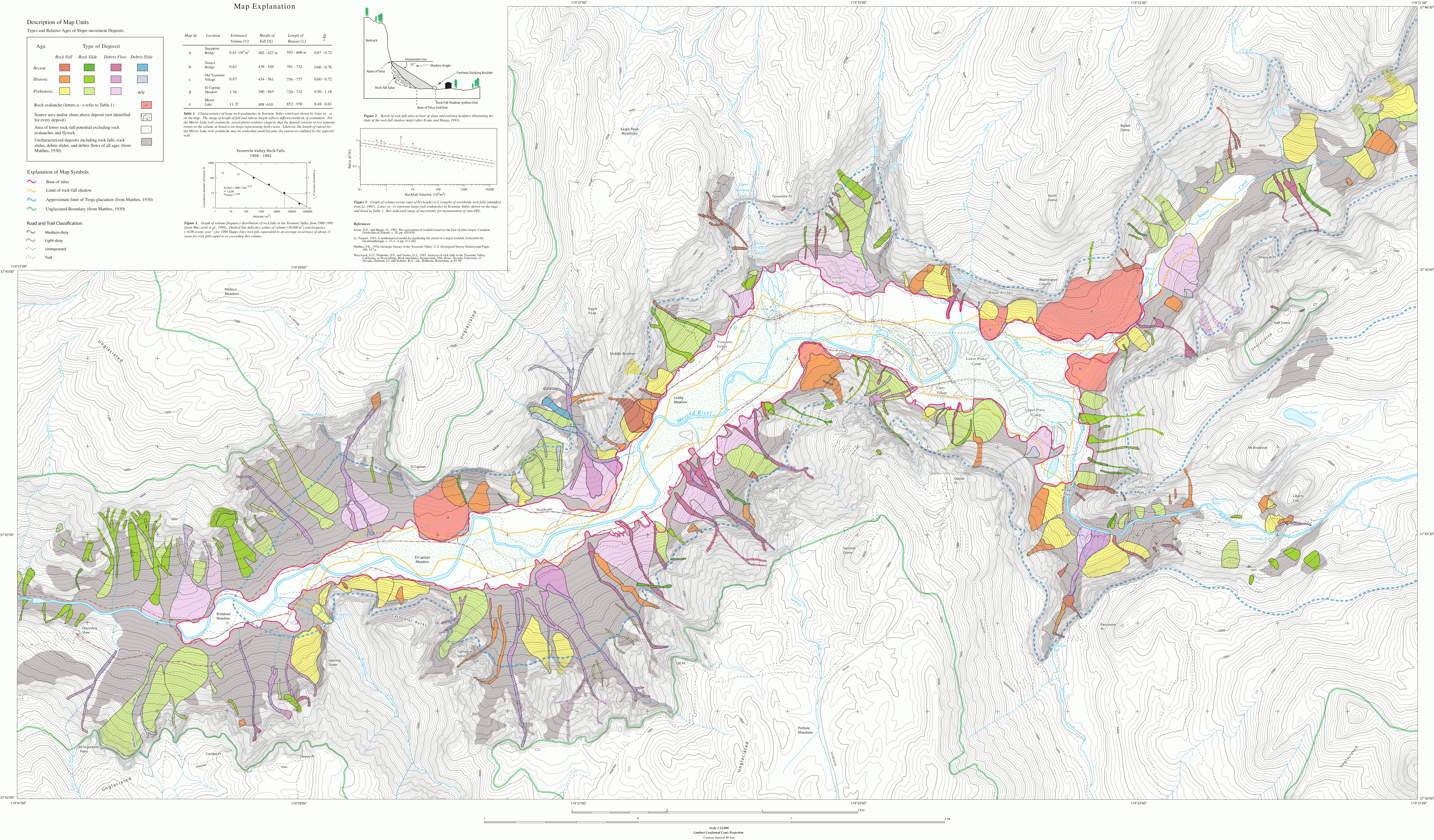
Yosemite Valley rockfall map, indicating the type of rockfall as well as location and known date of each one in Yosemite Valley. Rockfalls tend to be common in spring and winter.

Assessing the propagation of rockfall is a key issue for defining the best mitigation strategy as it allows the delineation of run out zones and the quantification of the rock blocks kinematics parameters along their way down to the elements at risk. In this purpose, many approaches may be considered. For example, the energy line method allows expediently estimating the rockfall run out. Numerical models simulating the rock block propagation offer a more detailed characterisation of the rockfall propagation kinematics. These simulation tools in particular focus on the modeling of the rebound of the rock block onto the soil The numerical models in particular provide the rock block passing height and kinetic energy that are necessary for designing passive mitigation structures.

== Mitigation ==
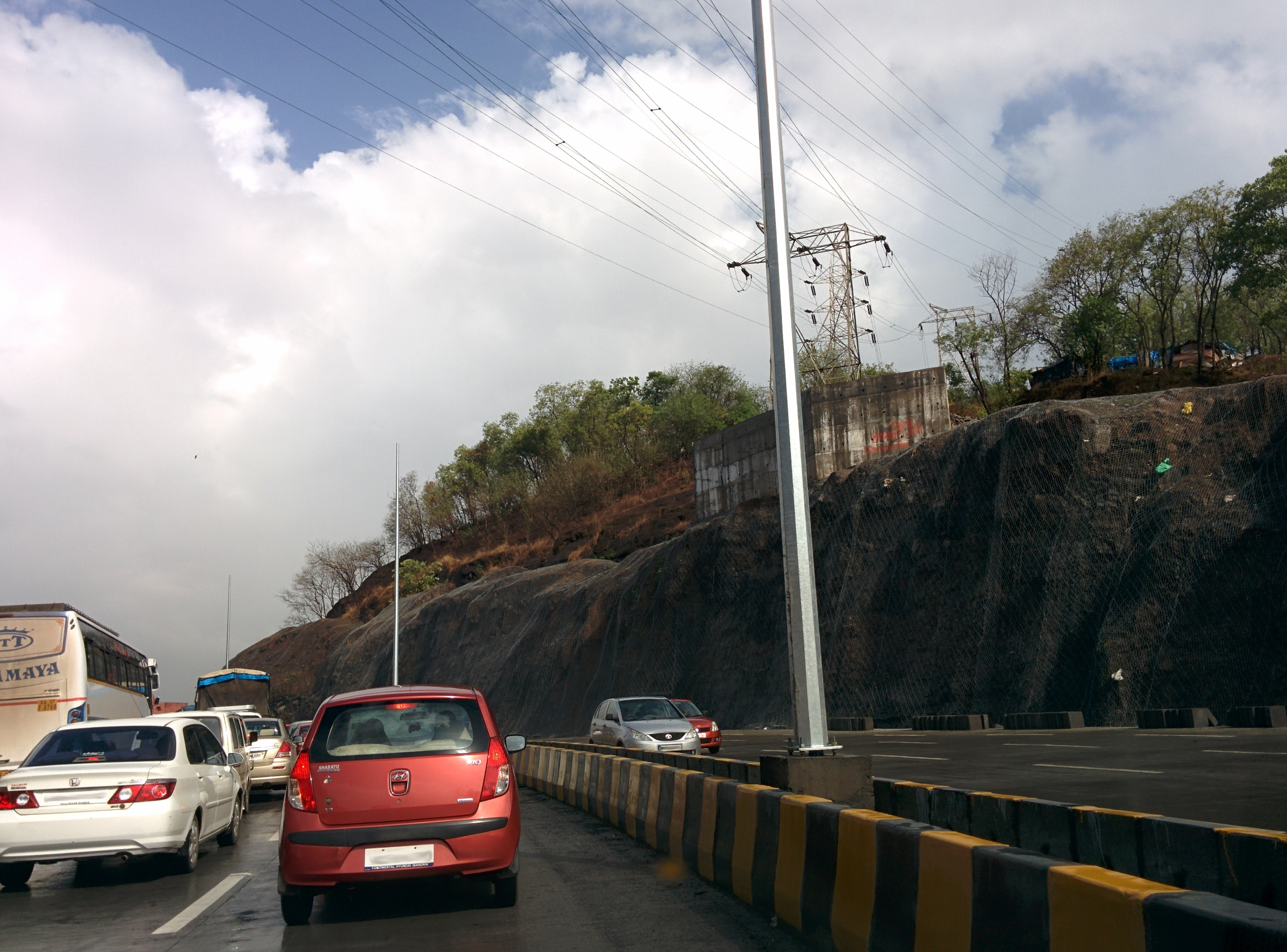
Steel nets installed for rockfall protection on Sion Panvel Highway in India.

Typically, rockfall events are mitigated in one of two ways: either by passive mitigation or active mitigation. Passive mitigation is where only the effects of the rockfall event are mitigated and are generally employed in the deposition or run-out zones, such as through the use of drape nets, rockfall catchment fences, galeries, ditches, embankments, etc. The rockfall still takes place but an attempt is made to control the outcome. In contrast, active mitigation is carried out in the initiation zone and prevents the rockfall event from ever occurring. Some examples of these measures are rock bolting, slope retention systems, shotcrete, etc. Other active measures might be by changing the geographic or climatic characteristics in the initiation zone, e.g. altering slope geometry, dewatering the slope, revegetation, etc.

Design guides of passive measures with respect to the block trajectory control have been proposed by several authors.

== Effects on trees ==
The effect of rockfalls on trees can be seen in several ways. The tree roots may rotate, via the rotational energy of the rockfall. The tree may move via the application of translational energy. And lastly deformation may occur, either elastic or plastic. Dendrochronology can reveal a past impact, with missing tree rings, as the tree rings grow around and close over a gap; the callus tissue can be seen microscopically. A macroscopic section can be used for dating of avalanche and rockfall events.

== See also ==
- Avalanche
- Earthquake
- Kinetic energy
- Landslide
- Potential energy
- Protection forest
- Rockslide
- Slope stability
- SMR classification
- Capitólio rockfall
