= Geomechanics =

Study of the motion of soil and rock

Geomechanics (from the Greek γεός, i.e. prefix geo- meaning "earth"; and "mechanics") is the study of the mechanical state of the Earth's crust and the processes occurring in it under the influence of natural physical factors. It involves the study of the mechanics of soil and rock.

== Background ==
The two main disciplines of geomechanics are soil mechanics and rock mechanics. Former deals with the soil behaviour from a small scale to a landslide scale. The latter deals with issues in geosciences related to rock mass characterization and rock mass mechanics, such as applied to petroleum, mining and civil engineering problems, such as borehole stability, tunnel design, rock breakage, slope stability, foundations, and rock drilling.

Many aspects of geomechanics overlap with parts of geotechnical engineering, engineering geology, and geological engineering. Modern developments relate to seismology, continuum mechanics, discontinuum mechanics, transport phenomena, numerical methods etc.

== Reservoir geomechanics ==
In the petroleum industry geomechanics is used to:

- predict pore pressure
- establish the integrity of the cap rock
- evaluate reservoir properties
- determine in-situ rock stress
- evaluate the wellbore stability
- calculate the optimal trajectory of the borehole
- predict and control sand occurrence in the well
- analyze the validity of drilling on depression
- characterize fractured reservoirs
- increase the efficiency of the development of fractured reservoirs
- evaluate hydraulic fractures stability
- study the reactivation of natural fractures and structural faults
- evaluate the effect of liquid and steam injection into the reservoir
- analyze surface subsidence
- determine the degree of the reservoir compaction
- quantify production loss due to the reservoir rock deformation
- evaluate shear deformation and casing collapse

To put into practice the geomechanics capabilities mentioned above, it is necessary to create a Geomechanical Model of the Earth (GEM) which consists of six key components that can be both calculated and estimated using field data:

- Vertical stress, δv (often called geostatic pressure or overburden stress)
- Maximum horizontal stress, δHmax
- Minimum horizontal stress, δHmin
- Stress orientation
- Pore pressure, Pp
- Elastic properties and rock strength: Young's modulus, Poisson's ratio, friction angle, UCS (unconfined compressive strength) and TSTR (tensile strength)

Geotechnical engineers rely on various techniques to obtain reliable data for geomechanical models. These techniques include coring and core testing, seismic data and log analysis, well testing methods such as transient pressure analysis and hydraulic fracturing stress testing, and geophysical methods such as acoustic emission.

== See also ==
- Earthquake engineering
- Geotechnics
- Rock mechanics

== Additional sources ==
- Jaeger, Cook, and Zimmerman (2008). Fundamentals of Rock Mechanics. Blackwell Publishing. ISBN 9780632057597.
- Chandramouli, P.N. (2014). Continuum Mechanics. Yes Dee Publishing Pvt Ltd. ISBN 9789380381398. Archived from the original on 2018-08-04.
