= Core recovery parameters =

Quality of core recovered from a borehole

Core recovery parameters describe the quality of core recovered from a borehole.

== Total core recovery ==
Total core recovery (TCR) is the borehole core recovery percentage.

TCR is defined as the quotient:

$TCR = \left(\frac{l_{\mathrm{sum~of~pieces}}}{l_\mathrm{tot~core~run}}\right)\times 100$%
$l_\mathrm{sum~of~pieces}$ = Sum of length of core pieces
$l_\mathrm{tot~core~run}$ = Total length of core run

== Solid core recovery ==
Solid core recovery (SCR) is the borehole core recovery percentage of solid, cylindrical, pieces of rock core.

SCR is defined as the quotient:

$SCR = \left(\frac{l_{\mathrm{total~length~of~core~in~pieces~with~full~core~diameter}}}{l_{\mathrm{tot~core~run}}}\right)\times 100$%
$l_{\mathrm{sum~of~solid~core~pieces~with~full~diameter}}$ = Sum of length of solid, cylindrical, core pieces
$l_{\mathrm{tot~core~run}}$ = Total length of core run

== Rock quality designation ==
Rock-quality designation (RQD) is a rough measure of the degree of jointing or fracture in a rock mass, measured as a percentage of the drill core in lengths of 10 cm or more. High-quality rock has an RQD of more than 75%, low quality of less than 50%. Rock quality designation (RQD) has several definitions. The most widely used definition was developed in 1964 by D. U. Deere. It is the borehole core recovery percentage incorporating only pieces of solid core that are longer than 100 mm in length measured along the centerline of the core. In this respect pieces of core that are not hard and sound should not be counted though they are 100 mm in length. RQD was originally introduced for use with core diameters of 54.7 mm (NX-size core). RQD has considerable value in estimating support of rock tunnels. RQD forms a basic element in some of the most used rock mass classification systems: Rock Mass Rating system (RMR) and Q-system.

RQD is defined as the quotient:

$RQD = \left(\frac{l_{\mathrm{sum~of~length~of~core~pieces~>100mm}}}{l_{\mathrm{tot~core~run}}}\right)\times 100$ %
$l_{\mathrm{sum~of~length~of~core~pieces~>10cm}}$ = Sum of length of core pieces that are > 100 mm (4 inches) measured along the centerline
$l_{\mathrm{tot~core~run}}$ = Total length of core run

== Rock mass classification ==
Many rock mass classification systems use core recovery parameters as input parameter, such as Rock Mass Rating and Q-system.
